= 1995 World Championships in Athletics – Men's pole vault =

These are the official results of the Men's Pole Vault event at the 1995 IAAF World Championships in Gothenburg, Sweden. There were a total number of 38 participating athletes, with two qualifying groups and the final held on Friday August 11, 1995. The qualification mark was set at 5.70 metres.

== Medalists ==
Gold	Sergey Bubka; Ukraine (UKR)
Silver	Maksim Tarasov; Russia (RUS)
Bronze	Jean Galfione; France (FRA)

== Schedule ==
- All times are Central European Time (UTC+1)

Qualification Round
Group A	Group B
09.08.1995 – 16:30h	09.08.1995 – 16:30h
Final Round
11.08.1995 – 16:15h

== Abbreviations ==
- All results shown are in metres

Q	automatic qualification
q	qualification by rank
DNS	did not start
NM	no mark
WR	world record
AR	area record
NR	national record
PB	personal best
SB	season best

== Qualifying round ==
- Held on Tuesday 1995-08-09

RANK	GROUP A	HEIGHT
1.	Maksim Tarasov (RUS)	5.65 m
2.	Dean Starkey (USA)	5.65 m
2.	Sergey Bubka (UKR)	5.65 m
4.	Valeri Bukrejev (EST)	5.65 m
5.	Igor Potapovich (KAZ)	5.65 m
6.	Tim Lobinger (GER)	5.65 m
7.	Jean Galfione (FRA)	5.55 m
8.	Heikki Vääräniemi (FIN)	5.55 m
9.	István Bagyula (HUN)	5.55 m
10.	Nick Buckfield (GBR)	5.55 m
11.	Peter Widén (SWE)	5.40 m
12.	Riaan Botha (RSA)	5.40 m
12.	Simon Arkell (AUS)	5.40 m
14.	Domitien Mestre (BEL)	5.20 m
15.	Aleksandr Zhukov (MDA)	5.20 m
15.	Christos Pallakis (GRE)	5.20 m
—	Paul Benavides (MEX)	NM
—	José Manuel Arcos (ESP)	NM
—	Ruhan Işim (TUR)	DNS

RANK	GROUP B	HEIGHT
1.	Radion Gataullin (RUS)	5.70 m
2.	Igor Trandenkov (RUS)	5.70 m
3.	Scott Huffman (USA)	5.65 m
4.	Andrei Tivontchik (GER)	5.65 m
5.	Okkert Brits (RSA)	5.65 m
6.	Trond Barthel (NOR)	5.55 m
7.	Patrik Stenlund (SWE)	5.55 m
8.	Dmitri Markov (BLR)	5.40 m
9.	Photis Stephani (CYP)	5.40 m
9.	Nuno Fernandes (POR)	5.40 m
11.	Kim Chul-Kyun (KOR)	5.40 m
12.	Javier García (ESP)	5.40 m
13.	James Miller (AUS)	5.20 m
14.	Martin Voss (DEN)	5.20 m
14.	Aleksandr Korchagin (KAZ)	5.20 m
14.	Jean-Michel Godard (FRA)	5.20 m
—	Bill Payne (USA)	NM
—	Grigoriy Yegorov (KAZ)	NM
—	Konstantin Semyonov (ISR)	NM

=== Final ===
Rank	Name	Nationality	5.60	5.70	5.80	5.86	5.92	6.15	Mark	Notes
1st place, gold medalist(s)	Sergey Bubka	Ukraine	–	xo	–	–	o	xxx	5.92	
2nd place, silver medalist(s)	Maksim Tarasov	Russia	–	xo	–	o	xxx		5.86	
3rd place, bronze medalist(s)	Jean Galfione	France	o	–	xo	xxo	xxx		5.86	
4	Okkert Brits	South Africa	xo	–	o	–	xxx		5.80	
5	Radion Gataullin	Russia	–	o	–	xxx			5.70	
6	Scott Huffman	United States	o	xo	xxx				5.70	
7	Igor Trandenkov	Russia	–	xxo	–	xxx			5.70	
8	Dean Starkey	United States	o	xxx					5.60	
9	Andrei Tivontchik	Germany							5.60	
9	Igor Potapovich	Kazakhstan							5.60	
11	Tim Lobinger	Germany							5.40	
	Valeri Bukrejev	Estonia							NM	
