= Athletics at the 1996 Summer Olympics – Men's pole vault =

Men's pole vault at the Games of the XXVI Olympiad
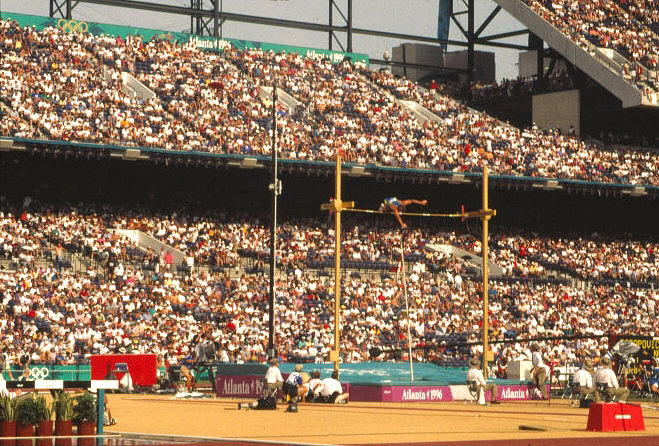
- Pole vaulting at the 1996 Summer Olympics
- Venue: Centennial Olympic Stadium
- Date: 31 July 1996 (qualifying); 2 August 1996 (final)
- Competitors: 37 from 24 nations
- Winning height: 5.92 OR

Medalists
1st place, gold medalist(s)		Jean Galfione; France
2nd place, silver medalist(s)		Igor Trandenkov; Russia
3rd place, bronze medalist(s)		Andrei Tivontchik; Germany

The men's pole vault was an event at the 1996 Summer Olympics in Atlanta, Georgia. Thirty-seven athletes from 24 nations competed. The maximum number of athletes per nation had been set at 3 since the 1930 Olympic Congress. The event was won by Jean Galfione of France, the nation's second victory in the event (previously in 1984). Igor Trandenkov took silver, the first medal for Russia in the pole vault in its first appearance as a separate delegation (though Trandenkov had himself taken silver in 1992 as well, as part of the Unified Team; Trandenkov was the sixth man to win two medals in the event and the first to do it under two different flags). Similarly, Andrei Tivontchik's bronze was the first for reunified Germany, though both East Germany and West Germany as well as the Unified Team of Germany had previously won medals.

== Summary ==
In the final, the tie between returning silver medalist Igor Trandenkov and Jean Galfione was broke by counting the number of their misses, with Galfione having had one miss earlier in the competition, and Trandenkov having had two misses, meaning that Galfione won gold, while Tradenkov earned second straight silver. Andrei Tivontchik cleared 5.92 on his second attempt to take bronze.

== Background ==
This was the 23rd appearance of the event, which is one of 12 athletics events to have been held at every Summer Olympics. The returning finalists from the 1992 Games were silver medalist Igor Trandenkov of the Unified Team (now representing Russia), bronze medalist Javier García of Spain, and eighth-place finisher Danny Krasnov of Israel. By this competition, Sergey Bubka (gold medalist in 1988 for the Soviet Union, finalist in 1992 for the Unified Team, and now competing for Ukraine) had already pushed the world record to its current state and was the overwhelming favorite to win. But continuing his Olympic curse, Bubka came into the competition with a heel injury and did not make an attempt. To add further injury, his brother Vasiliy Bubka was one of seven athletes unable to clear a height in qualifying. Without Sergey Bubka competing, the field was "wide-open."

Belarus, Kazakhstan, Moldova, Saint Lucia, and Ukraine each made their men's pole vaulting debut. The United States made its 22nd appearance, most of any nation, having missed only the boycotted 1980 Games.

== Competition format ==
The competition used the two-round format introduced in 1912, with results cleared between rounds. Vaulters received three attempts at each height. Ties were broken by the countback rule.

In the qualifying round, the bar was set at 5.20 metres, 5.40 metres, 5.60 metres, and 5.70 metres. All vaulters clearing 5.70 metres advanced to the final. If fewer than 12 cleared that height, the top 12 (including ties, after applying the countback rules) advanced.

In the final, the bar was set at 5.40 metres, 5.60 metres, 5.70 metres, 5.80 metres, 5.86 metres, 5.92 metres, 5.97 metres, and 6.02 metres.

== Records ==
These were the standing world and Olympic records (in metres) prior to the 1996 Summer Olympics.

World record	Sergey Bubka (UKR)	6.14	Sestriere, Italy	31 July 1994
Olympic record	Sergey Bubka (URS)	5.90	Seoul, South Korea	30 July 1988

The three medalists (Jean Galfione, Igor Trandenkov, and Andrei Tivontchik) all cleared 5.92 metres, breaking the Olympic record. None succeeded at any higher attempts.

== Schedule ==
All times are Eastern Daylight Time (UTC-4)

Date	Time	Round
Wednesday, 31 July 1996	9:30	Qualifying
Friday, 2 August 1996	17:00	Final

== Results ==
Key

- o = Height cleared
- x = Height failed
- – = Height passed
- r = Retired
- SB = Season's best
- PB = Personal best
- NR = National record
- AR = Area record
- OR = Olympic record
- WR = World record
- WL = World lead
- NM = No mark
- DNS = Did not start
- DQ = Disqualified

=== Qualifying ===
The qualifying round was held on Wednesday July 31, 1996. Qualification rule: Qualifying performance 5.70 (Q) or at least 12 best performers (q) advance to the final.

Rank	Group	Athlete	Nation	5.20	5.40	5.60	5.70	Height	Notes
1	A	Alain Andji	France	–	o	o	o	5.70	Q
1	A	Tim Lobinger	Germany	–	o	o	o	5.70	Q
1	B	Pyotr Bochkaryov	Russia	–	–	o	o	5.70	Q
1	B	Riaan Botha	South Africa	–	o	o	o	5.70	Q
5	A	Jeff Hartwig	United States	–	o	xo	o	5.70	Q
5	B	Jean Galfione	France	–	xo	o	o	5.70	Q
7	A	Igor Trandenkov	Russia	–	–	xxo	o	5.70	Q
8	A	Igor Potapovich	Kazakhstan	–	–	o	xo	5.70	Q
9	B	Andrei Tivontchik	Germany	–	–	o	xxo	5.70	Q
10	A	Michael Stolle	Germany	xo	xo	o	xxo	5.70	Q
11	B	Lawrence Johnson	United States	–	xo	xxo	xxo	5.70	Q
12	A	Dmitriy Markov	Belarus	–	o	o	xxx	5.60	q
12	B	Scott Huffman	United States	–	o	o	xxx	5.60	q
12	B	Danny Krasnov	Israel	–	o	o	xxx	5.60	q
15	B	José Manuel Arcos	Spain	–	xxo	o	xxx	5.60	
16	A	Jim Miller	Australia	–	xo	xo	xxx	5.60	
17	A	Viktor Chistyakov	Russia	–	xxo	xo	xxx	5.60	
18	A	Nuno Fernandes	Portugal	xo	o	xxo	xxx	5.60	
18	B	Heikki Vääräniemi	Finland	–	xo	xxo	xxx	5.60	
20	A	Konstantin Semyonov	Israel	–	o	x–	xx	5.40	
20	B	Nick Buckfield	Great Britain	–	o	xxx	—N/a	5.40	
20	B	Javier García	Spain	–	o	xxx	—N/a	5.40	
23	A	Laurens Looije	Netherlands	xxo	o	xxx	—N/a	5.40	
24	A	Neil Winter	Great Britain	o	xo	xxx	—N/a	5.40	
24	B	Kim Chul-kyun	South Korea	o	xo	xxx	—N/a	5.40	
26	B	Martin Voss	Denmark	xo	xo	x–	xx	5.40	
27	B	Aleksandrs Obižajevs	Latvia	–	xxo	xxx	—N/a	5.40	
28	A	Edgar Díaz	Puerto Rico	xo	xxo	xxx	—N/a	5.40	
29	B	Alexandru Jucov	Moldova	o	xxx	—N/a		5.20	
30	A	Teruyasu Yonekura	Japan	xxo	xxx	—N/a		5.20	
—	A	Okkert Brits	South Africa	–	–	xxx	—N/a	No mark	
—	A	Vasiliy Bubka	Ukraine	–	xxx	—N/a		No mark	
—	A	Juan Gabriel Concepción	Spain	–	xxx	—N/a		No mark	
—	A	Kersley Gardenne	Mauritius	xxx	—N/a			No mark	
—	B	Simon Arkell	Australia	–	xxx	—N/a		No mark	
—	B	Valeri Bukrejev	Estonia	–	xxx	—N/a		No mark	
—	B	Dominic Johnson	Saint Lucia	xxx	—N/a			No mark	
—	B	Sergey Bubka	Ukraine	DNS					

=== Final ===
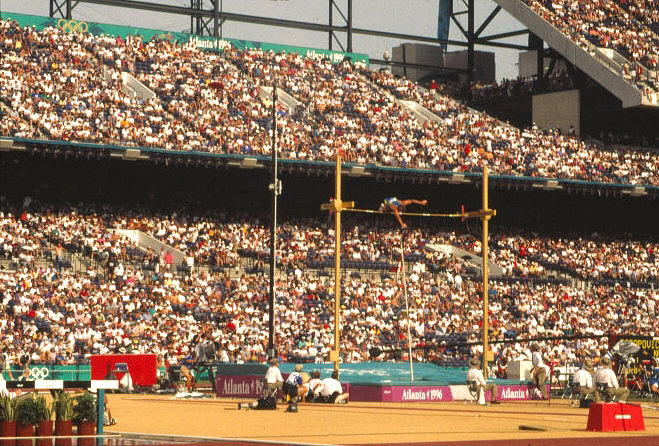
Igor Potapovich in Atlanta

The final was held on Friday August 2, 1996.

Rank	Athlete	Nation	5.40	5.60	5.70	5.80	5.86	5.92	5.97	6.02	Height	Notes
1st place, gold medalist(s)	Jean Galfione	France	–	o	–	xo	o	o	x–	xx	5.92	OR
2nd place, silver medalist(s)	Igor Trandenkov	Russia	–	–	o	–	xx–	o	–	xxx	5.92	OR
3rd place, bronze medalist(s)	Andrei Tivontchik	Germany	–	xo	–	xo	xo	xo	xxx	—N/a	5.92	OR
4	Igor Potapovich	Kazakhstan	–	–	o	–	o	x–	xx	—N/a	5.86	
5	Pyotr Bochkaryov	Russia	–	xo	–	xo	o	xx–	x	—N/a	5.86	
6	Dmitriy Markov	Belarus	o	o	xo	xxo	xo	xxx	—N/a		5.86	
7	Tim Lobinger	Germany	–	o	o	o	x–	xx	—N/a		5.80	
8	Lawrence Johnson	United States	o	o	o	xxx	—N/a				5.70	
9	Alain Andji	France	o	o	xxo	xxx	—N/a				5.70	
9	Michael Stolle	Germany	o	o	xxo	xxx	—N/a				5.70	
11	Jeff Hartwig	United States	o	o	xxx	—N/a					5.60	
11	Danny Krasnov	Israel	o	o	xxx	—N/a					5.60	
13	Scott Huffman	United States	xo	o	xxx	—N/a					5.60	
14	Riaan Botha	South Africa	o	xo	–	xxx	—N/a				5.60	
