= 1999 World Championships in Athletics – Men's pole vault =

These are the official results of the Men's Pole Vault event at the 1999 IAAF World Championships in Athletics in Seville, Spain. There were a total number of 34 participating athletes, with two qualifying groups and the final held on Thursday 26 August 1999 at 19:10h.

== Medalists ==
Gold	Maksim Tarasov; Russia (RUS)
Silver	Dmitriy Markov; Australia (AUS)
Bronze	Aleksandr Averbukh; Israel (ISR)

== Schedule ==
- All times are Central European Time (UTC+1)

Qualification Round
Group A	Group B
24.08.1999 – 19:30h	24.08.1999 – 19:30h
Final Round
26.08.1999 – 19:10h

== Records ==
World Record	Sergey Bubka (UKR)	6.14	Sestriere	31 July 1994
Championship Record	Sergey Bubka (UKR)	6.01	Athens, Greece	10 August 1997

== Abbreviations ==
- All results shown are in metres

Q	automatic qualification
q	qualification by rank
DNS	did not start
NM	no mark
WR	world record
AR	area record
NR	national record
PB	personal best
SB	season best

== Results ==
=== Qualification ===
Qualification: Qualifying Performance 5.75 (Q) or at least 12 best performers (q) advance to the final.

Rank	Group	Name	5.40	5.55	5.65	5.70	5.75	Result	Notes
1	A	Maksim Tarasov (RUS)	-	-	-	o	-	5.70	q
1	A	Dmitri Markov (AUS)	-	o	-	o	-	5.70	q
1	A	Danny Ecker (GER)	o	o	o	o	-	5.70	q
1	B	Michael Stolle (GER)	-	o	-	o	x	5.70	q
1	B	Igor Potapovich (KAZ)	-	o	-	o		5.70	q
6	B	Jean Galfione (FRA)	-	xo	-	o	x	5.70	q
7	A	Nick Hysong (USA)	-	-	xxo	xo	-	5.70	q
8	A	Romain Mesnil (FRA)	-	o	-	xxo		5.70	q
9	A	Tim Lobinger (GER)	o	xxo	xo	xxo	-	5.70	q
10	B	Aleksandr Averbukh (ISR)	-	o	o	-	x	5.65	q
11	A	Montxu Miranda (ESP)	o	xxo	xo	xx-		5.65	q
12	A	Okkert Brits (RSA)	o	o	xxo	xxx		5.65	q
12	B	Danny Krasnov (ISR)	-	o	xxo	-	x	5.65	q
14	A	Pat Manson (USA)	-	o	xxx			5.55	
14	A	Martin Eriksson (SWE)	-	o	xxx			5.55	
14	B	Jeff Hartwig (USA)	-	o	-	xxx		5.55	
17	B	José Manuel Arcos (ESP)	xo	o	xxx			5.55	
18	B	Dominic Johnson (LCA)	o	xo	xxx			5.55	
19	A	Heikki Vaaraniemi (FIN)	o	xxo	xxx			5.55	
19	A	Petr Špaček (CZE)	o	xxo	xxx			5.55	
19	B	Vadim Strogalyov (RUS)	-	xxo	xxx			5.55	
19	B	Jussi Autio (FIN)	o	xxo	xxx			5.55	
23	A	Thibaut Duval (BEL)	o	xxx				5.40	
23	A	Martin Kysela (CZE)	o	xxx				5.40	
23	B	Javier García (ESP)	o	xxx				5.40	
23	B	Martin Voss (DEN)	o	xxx				5.40	
27	A	Maurilio Mariani (ITA)	xo	xxx				5.40	
27	B	Kevin Hughes (GBR)	xo	xxx				5.40	
29	B	Stepan Janacek (CZE)	xxo	xxx				5.40	
29	B	Patrik Kristiansson (SWE)	xxo	xxx				5.40	
–	A	Fumiaki Kobayashi (JPN)	xxx					NM	
–	B	Trond Barthel (NOR)	xxx					NM	
–	A	Grigoriy Yegorov (KAZ)						DNS	
–	B	Viktor Chistyakov (AUS)						DNS	

=== Final ===
26 August

Rank	Name	5.50	5.70	5.80	5.90	5.96	6.02	6.07	Result	Notes
Gold medal	Maksim Tarasov (RUS)	-	o	-	o	xxo	o	-	6.02	CR
Silver medal	Dmitri Markov (AUS)	-	o	-	o	-	x-	xx	5.90	
Bronze medal	Aleksandr Averbukh (ISR)	-	xo	xo	xxx				5.80	NR
4	Danny Ecker (GER)	o	o	xxx					5.70	
4	Nick Hysong (USA)	o	o	xxx					5.70	
6	Tim Lobinger (GER)	o	xo	xxx					5.70	
7	Michael Stolle (GER)	o	xxo	-	xxx				5.70	
7	Igor Potapovich (KAZ)	-	xxo	-	x-	xx			5.70	
9	Danny Krasnov (ISR)	o	xxx						5.50	
10	Okkert Brits (RSA)	xo	-	xxx					5.50	
—	Jean Galfione (FRA)	-	xxx						NM	
—	Romain Mesnil (FRA)	xxx							NM	
—	Montxu Miranda (ESP)								DNS	
