= 1997 World Championships in Athletics – Men's pole vault =

The final of the Men's Pole Vault event at the 1997 World Championships in Athletics was held on Sunday August 10, 1997, in Athens, Greece.

== Medalists ==
Gold	Sergey Bubka; Ukraine (UKR)
Silver	Maksim Tarasov; Russia (RUS)
Bronze	Dean Starkey; United States (USA)

== Schedule ==
- All times are Eastern European Time (UTC+2)

Qualification Round
Group A	Group B
08.08.1997 – 17:30h	08.08.1997 – 17:30h
Final Round
10.08.1997 – 17:30h

== Abbreviations ==
- All results shown are in metres

Q	automatic qualification
q	qualification by rank
DNS	did not start
NM	no mark
WR	world record
AR	area record
NR	national record
PB	personal best
SB	season best

== Records ==
Standing records prior to the 1997 World Athletics Championships
World Record	Sergey Bubka (UKR)	6.14 m	July 31, 1994	Sestriere, Italy
Event Record	Sergey Bubka (UKR)	6.00 m	August 19, 1993	Stuttgart, Germany
Broken records during the 1997 World Athletics Championships
Event Record	Sergey Bubka (UKR)	6.01 m	August 10, 1997	Athens, Greece

== Results ==
=== Qualification ===
Qualification: Qualifying Performance 5.75 (Q) or at least 12 best performers (q) advance to the final.

==== Group A ====
Rank	Name	5.30	5.45	5.60	5.70	Result	Notes
1	Tim Lobinger (GER)	–	o	o	o	5.70	q
1	Maksim Tarasov (RUS)	–	–	–	o	5.70	q
3	Sergey Bubka (UKR)	–	–	–	xo	5.70	q
3	Nick Buckfield (GBR)	o	o	o	xo	5.70	q
5	Trond Barthel (NOR)	–	xo	xo	xo	5.70	q
6	Pat Manson (USA)	–	o	o	xxo	5.70	q
7	Danny Krasnov (ISR)	–	xo	o	xxo	5.70	q
8	Juan Gabriel Concepción (ESP)	xxo	xxo	o	xxx	5.60	
9	Alain Andji (FRA)	–	o	xxo	xxx	5.60	
9	Andrei Tivontschik (GER)	–	–	xxo	xxx	5.60	
11	Peter Widen (SWE)	–	o	xxx		5.45	
12	Ilian Efremov (BUL)	xxo	o	xxx		5.45	
13	Vesa Rantanen (FIN)	o	xo	xxx		5.45	
14	Andrea Giannini (ITA)	xo	xo	xxx		5.45	
15	Edgardo Díaz (PUR)	o	xxo	xxx		5.45	
16	Ruhan Işim (TUR)	xxo	xxx			5.30	
–	Okkert Brits (RSA)	–	–	xx-	x	NM	
–	Lawrence Johnson (USA)	–	–	xxx		NM	
–	Aleksandr Korchagin (KAZ)	xxx				NM	
–	Montxu Miranda (ESP)	–				DNF	

==== Group B ====
Rank	Name	5.30	5.45	5.60	5.70	Result	Notes
1	Martin Eriksson (SWE)	–	o	xo	o	5.70	q
2	Yevgeniy Smiryagin (RUS)	xo	o	xxo	o	5.70	q
3	Jean Galfione (FRA)	–	xo	–	xo	5.70	q
4	Vadim Strogalyov (RUS)	–	xxo	–	xo	5.70	q
5	Riaan Botha (RSA)	–	–	o	xxo	5.70	q
6	Dean Starkey (USA)	–	xo	xo	xxo	5.70	q
7	Igor Potapovich (KAZ)	–	–	o	xxx	5.60	
8	Khalid Lachheb (FRA)	xo	o	xo	xxx	5.60	
9	Michael Stolle (GER)	o	o	xxo	xxx	5.60	
10	Fabio Pizzolato (ITA)	xxo	o	xxo	xxx	5.60	
11	Paul Gibbons (NZL)	o	xo	xxx		5.45	
12	Laurens Looije (NED)	o	xxx			5.30	
12	Vyacheslav Shuteyev (UKR)	o	xxx			5.30	
–	Heikki Vaaraniemi (FIN)	–	xxx			NM	
–	Javier García (ESP)	–	xxx			NM	
–	Stavros Tsitouras (GRE)	–	xxx			NM	
–	Martin Voss (DEN)	xxx				NM	
–	Jurij Rovan (SLO)	xxx				NM	
–	Dmitriy Markov (BLR)					DNS	

=== Final ===
Rank	Name	5.50	5.70	5.80	5.86	5.91	5.96	6.01	6.06	6.15	Result	Notes
Gold medal	Sergey Bubka (UKR)	–	xo	-	-	xo	-	o	-	DNF	6.01	CR
Silver medal	Maksim Tarasov (RUS)	–	xo	-	o	xxo	o	x-	xx		5.96	
Bronze medal	Dean Starkey (USA)	xo	o	o	xxo	xxo	x-	xx			5.91	SB
4	Tim Lobinger (GER)	o	o	o	xxx						5.80	
5	Nick Buckfield (GBR)	o	o	xxx							5.70	
6	Pat Manson (USA)	xo	o	xxx							5.70	
7	Vadim Strogalyov (RUS)	o	xxo	xxx							5.70	
8	Yevgeniy Smiryagin (RUS)	xo	xxo	xxx							5.70	
9	Martin Eriksson (SWE)	o	xxx								5.50	
9	Danny Krasnov (ISR)	o	xxx								5.50	
11	Trond Barthel (NOR)	xo	xxx								5.50	
—	Riaan Botha (RSA)	-	xxx								NM	
—	Jean Galfione (FRA)	-	xxx								NM	
