= 1996 European Athletics Indoor Championships – Men's pole vault =

The men's pole vault event at the 1996 European Athletics Indoor Championships was held in Stockholm Globe Arena on 8–9 March.

== Medalists ==
Gold	Silver	Bronze
Dmitri Markov; Belarus	Viktor Chistiakov; Russia	Pyotr Bochkaryov; Russia

== Results ==
=== Qualification ===
Qualification performance: 5.60 (Q) or at least 12 best performers (q) advanced to the final.

Rank	Athlete	Nationality	Result	Notes
1	Dmitri Markov	Belarus	5.60	Q
2	Tim Lobinger	Germany	5.55	q
2	Michael Stolle	Germany	5.55	q
2	Pyotr Bochkaryov	Russia	5.55	q
2	Peter Widén	Sweden	5.55	q
2	Nick Buckfield	Great Britain	5.55	q
2	Martin Eriksson	Sweden	5.55	q
2	Alain Andji	France	5.55	q
2	Konstantin Semyonov	Israel	5.55	q
2	Isaac Molinero	Spain	5.55	q
11	Viktor Chistiakov	Russia	5.45	q
11	Trond Barthel	Norway	5.45	q
13	Danny Krasnov	Israel	5.45	
13	Laurens Looije	Netherlands	5.45	
15	Gabriel Concepción	Spain	5.35	
15	Jean-Marc Tailhardat	France	5.35	
15	Ruhan Işım	Turkey	5.35	
15	Aleksandr Jucov	Moldova	5.35	
19	Konstantinos Tsatalos	Greece	5.20	
19	Maurilio Mariani	Italy	5.20	
19	Christian Tamminga	Netherlands	5.20	
	Jean Galfione	France	NM	
	Nuno Fernandes	Portugal	NM	
	Edward Klaus	Germany	NM	

=== Final ===
Rank	Name	Nationality	5.25	5.45	5.55	5.65	5.70	5.75	5.80	5.85	5.90	Result	Notes
1st place, gold medalist(s)	Dmitri Markov	Belarus	–	–	o	–	o	–	xo	xxo	xxx	5.85	
2nd place, silver medalist(s)	Viktor Chistiakov	Russia	–	–	o	–	xo	–	o	–	xxx	5.80	
3rd place, bronze medalist(s)	Pyotr Bochkaryov	Russia	–	–	–	o	–	–	xo	–	xxx	5.80	
4	Peter Widén	Sweden	–	o	xo	xo	o	xxx				5.70	NR
5	Martin Eriksson	Sweden	–	o	xo	o	xxo	xxx				5.70	NR
6	Tim Lobinger	Germany	–	–	xo	o	–	xxx				5.65	
7	Nick Buckfield	Great Britain	xo	o	xxo	xxx						5.55	
8	Michael Stolle	Germany	o	o	–	xxx						5.45	
8	Konstantin Semyonov	Israel	–	o	xxx							5.45	
8	Alain Andji	France	o	o	–	xxx						5.45	
11	Isaac Molinero	Spain	o	xxx								5.25	
	Trond Barthel	Norway	xxx									NM	
