= 1995 IAAF World Indoor Championships – Men's pole vault =

The men's pole vault event at the 1995 IAAF World Indoor Championships was held on 10–11 March.

== Medalists ==
Gold	Silver	Bronze
Sergey Bubka; Ukraine	Igor Potapovich; Kazakhstan	Okkert Brits; South Africa; Andrej Tiwontschik; Germany

== Results ==
=== Qualification ===
Qualification: 5.65 (Q) or at least 12 best performers (q) qualified for the final.

Rank	Group	Name	Nationality	5.30	5.40	5.50	5.60	5.65	Result	Notes
1	A	Christos Pallakis	Greece	o	o	o	–	o	5.65	Q
1	B	Sergey Bubka	Ukraine	–	–	–	–	o	5.65	Q
1	B	Patrik Stenlund	Sweden	–	o	–	o	o	5.65	Q
4	B	Okkert Brits	South Africa	–	–	xo	–	o	5.65	Q
4	B	Nick Hysong	United States	–	–	xo	o	o	5.65	Q
4	B	Igor Potapovich	Kazakhstan	–	–	x–	–	o	5.65	Q
7	B	José Manuel Arcos	Spain	o	–	o	xxo	o	5.65	Q
8	B	Maksim Tarasov	Russia	–	–	–	–	xo	5.65	Q
9	B	Andrej Tiwontschik	Germany	–	–	xo	–	xo	5.65	Q
10	B	Tim Bright	United States	–	–	xo	xo	xo	5.65	Q
11	B	Valeri Bukrejev	Estonia	–	–	o	–	xxo	5.65	Q
12	A	Petri Peltoniemi	Finland	–	o	–	o	xxx	5.60	q
12	A	Javier García	Spain	–	o	–	o	xxx	5.60	q
14	A	Danny Krasnov	Israel	–	–	xo	o	xxx	5.60	
15	B	István Bagyula	Hungary	o	–	o	xxo	xxx	5.60	
16	A	Dmitriy Markov	Belarus	o	–	xxo	xxo	xxx	5.60	
16	A	Nuno Fernandes	Portugal	o	–	xxo	xxo	xxx	5.60	
18	B	Tim Lobinger	Germany	o	o	xo	xxx		5.50	
19	B	Martin Voss	Denmark	–	xxo	xxo	xxx		5.50	
20	A	Alain Andji	France	o	–	xxx			5.30	
20	B	Vadim Strogalyov	Russia	o	–	xxx			5.30	
22	A	Domitien Mestre	Belgium	xo	–	xxx			5.30	
22	A	Jean-Michel Godard	France	xo	–	xxx			5.30	
24	A	Krzysztof Kusiak	Poland	xxo	xxx				5.30	
24	A	Konstantinos Tsatalos	Greece	xxo	xxx				5.30	
24	B	Jan Netscher	Czech Republic	xxo	xxx				5.30	
	A	Gianni Iapichino	Italy	xxx					NM	
	A	Trond Barthel	Norway	xxx					NM	
	B	Peter Widén	Sweden	–	xxx				NM	

=== Final ===
Rank	Name	Nationality	5.40	5.50	5.60	5.70	5.75	5.80	5.85	5.90	6.05	Results	Notes
1st place, gold medalist(s)	Sergey Bubka	Ukraine	–	–	–	o	–	–	–	xo	xxx	5.90	
2nd place, silver medalist(s)	Igor Potapovich	Kazakhstan	–	–	xxo	–	–	xo	xx–	x		5.80	
3rd place, bronze medalist(s)	Okkert Brits	South Africa	–	–	o	–	xo	–	xxx			5.75	
3rd place, bronze medalist(s)	Andrej Tiwontschik	Germany	–	–	o	–	xo	–	xxx			5.75	
5	Nick Hysong	United States	–	o	o	o	–	xxx				5.70	
5	José Manuel Arcos	Spain	o	–	o	o	–	xxx				5.70	
7	Javier García	Spain	o	–	xo	xxx						5.60	
7	Maksim Tarasov	Russia	–	–	xo	–	–	xxx				5.60	
9	Christos Pallakis	Greece	xo	o	xo	xxx						5.60	
10	Petri Peltoniemi	Finland	–	o	–	xxx						5.50	
10	Patrik Stenlund	Sweden	–	o	–	xxx						5.50	
	Tim Bright	United States	–	–	xxx							NM	
	Valeri Bukrejev	Estonia	–	–	xxx							NM	
