= Athletics at the 2000 Summer Olympics – Men's pole vault =

Men's pole vault at the Games of the XXVII Olympiad
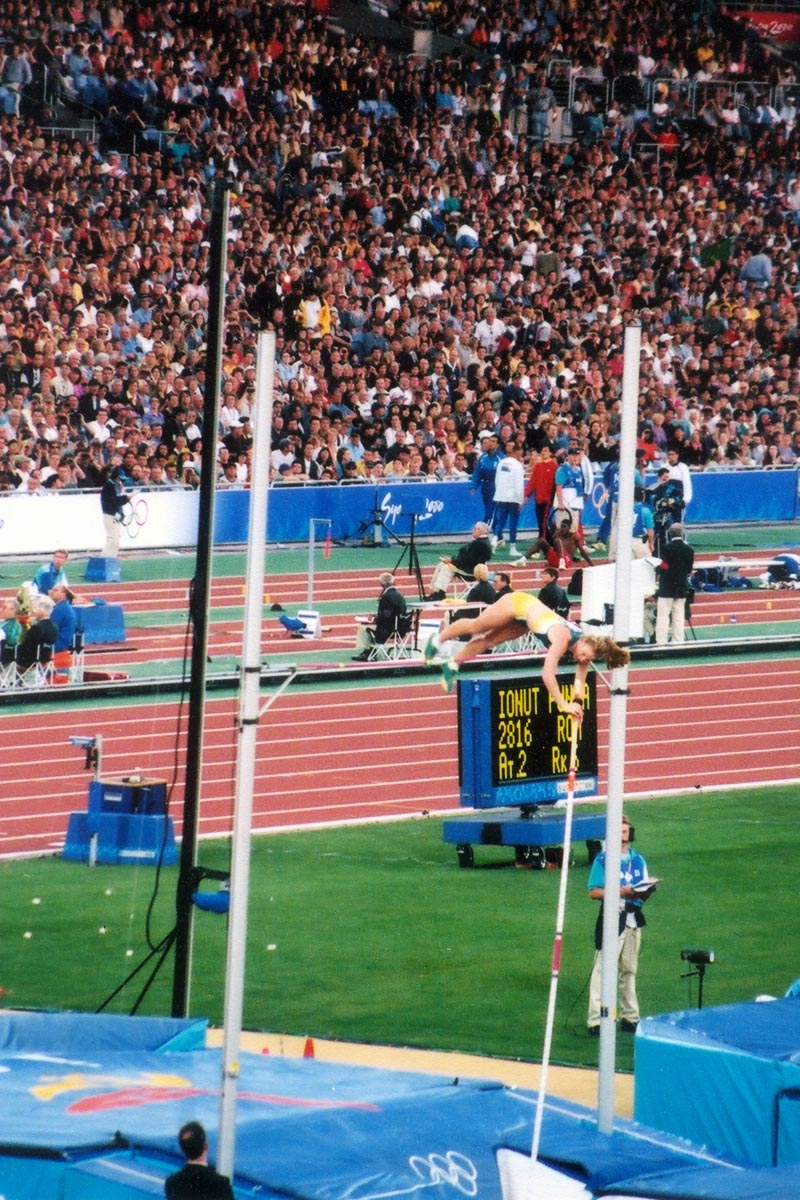
- Pole vaulting at the 2000 Summer Olympics (women's)
- Venue: Stadium Australia
- Date: 27 September 2000 (qualifying); 29 September 2000 (final)
- Competitors: 36 from 22 nations
- Winning height: 5.90

Medalists
1st place, gold medalist(s)		Nick Hysong; United States
2nd place, silver medalist(s)		Lawrence Johnson; United States
3rd place, bronze medalist(s)		Maksim Tarasov; Russia

The men's pole vault event at the 2000 Summer Olympics as part of the athletics program was held at the Olympic Stadium on Wednesday, 27 September, and Friday, 29 September. Thirty-six athletes from 22 nations competed. The maximum number of athletes per nation had been set at 3 since the 1930 Olympic Congress. The event was won by Nick Hysong of the United States, the nation's first victory in the event since its 16-Games streak (from 1896 to 1968) ended. The American team also took silver, as Lawrence Johnson finished second. Russia's Maksim Tarasov became the seventh man to win multiple pole vault medals, and the second to do so under two different flags, adding a bronze to his 1992 gold (for the Unified Team).

== Summary ==
Sergey Bubka had been the dominant pole vaulter and world record holder for five Olympic cycles and this was his fourth Olympic appearance, but the Bubka curse continued into a third consecutive Olympics as he failed to clear a height for the second time (it also happened at Barcelona in 1992). Eight men managed to get to 5.90 m (19 ft 4 1/4 in), the winning height. Australia's two Russian−born vaulters Viktor Chistiakov and Dmitriy Markov were perfect before their adopted home crowd to that point, along with American Lawrence Johnson. With an earlier miss at 5.50m, Nick Hysong was in fourth place, but his first attempt clearance leapfrogged him into the lead, when the rest of the field failed to match him. Johnson was the only one to make it on his second attempt, putting him in the silver position. 1992 champion Maksim Tarasov entered the height tied for fifth with Okkert Brits with three earlier misses, while Michael Stolle had already taken seven attempts to get over his first three bars. Both Tarasov and Stolle made 5.90m on their last attempt, but Tarasov had the tiebreaker to take the bronze. Markov saved one heroic attempt to snatch victory, but nobody could clear 5.96m.

== Background ==
This was the 24th appearance of the event, which is one of 12 athletics events to have been held at every Summer Olympics. The returning finalists from the 1996 Games were gold medalist Jean Galfione of France, fourth-place finisher Igor Potapovich of Kazakhstan, sixth-place finisher Dmitriy Markov of Belarus (now representing Australia), seventh-place finisher Tim Lobinger of Germany, eighth-place finisher Lawrence Johnson of the United States, ninth-place finisher Michael Stolle of Germany, and eleventh-place finisher (and 1992 finalist) Danny Krasnov of Israel. 1992 gold medalist Maksim Tarasov (then of the Unified Team, now of Russia) also returned, and was the reigning world champion—the first man other than Sergey Bubka to win that title. Bubka, of Ukraine, was the favorite (especially in the absence of 2004 leader Jeff Hartwig, who had failed to make the United States team); Bubka had been the best pole vaulter in the world since the early 1980s but had managed only one Olympic medal, gold in 1988 (missing 1984 due to boycott, failing to clear a height in the 1992 final, and 1996 due to injury).

The Czech Republic made its men's pole vaulting debut, although Czechoslovakia had participated before. The United States made its 23rd appearance, most of any nation, having missed only the boycotted 1980 Games.

== Qualification ==
Each National Olympic Committee was permitted to enter up to three athletes that had jumped 5.60 metres or higher during the qualification period. The maximum number of athletes per nation had been set at 3 since the 1930 Olympic Congress. If a NOC had no athletes that qualified under that standard, one athlete that had jumped 5.45 metres or higher could be entered.

== Competition format ==
The competition used the two-round format introduced in 1912, with results cleared between rounds. Vaulters received three attempts at each height. Ties were broken by the countback rule.

In the qualifying round, the bar was set at 5.25 metres, 5.40 metres, 5.55 metres, 5.65 metres, and 5.70 metres. The next step would have been 5.75 metres, but no vaulters attempted that height. All vaulters clearing 5.75 metres advanced to the final. If fewer than 12 cleared that height, the top 12 (including ties, after applying the countback rules) advanced.

In the final, the bar was set at 5.50 metres, 5.70 metres, 5.80 metres, 5.90 metres, and 5.96 metres.

== Records ==
These were the standing world and Olympic records (in meters) before the 2000 Summer Olympics.

World record	Sergey Bubka (UKR)	6.14	Sestriere, Italy	31 July 1994
Olympic record	Jean Galfione (FRA); Igor Trandenkov (RUS); Andrei Tivontchik (GER)	5.92	Atlanta, United States	2 August 1996

No new world or Olympic records were set during the competition.

== Schedule ==
All times are Australian Eastern Standard Time (UTC+10)

Date	Time	Round
Wednesday, 27 September 2000	18:30	Qualifying
Friday, 29 September 2000	18:30	Final

== Results ==
Key

- o = Height cleared
- x = Height failed
- – = Height passed
- r = Retired
- SB = Season's best
- PB = Personal best
- NR = National record
- AR = Area record
- OR = Olympic record
- WR = World record
- WL = World lead
- NM = No mark
- DNS = Did not start
- DQ = Disqualified

=== Qualifying ===
The qualifying round was held on Wednesday, 27 September 2000. The qualifying height was 5.75 metres. For all qualifiers who did not achieve the standard, the remaining spaces in the final were filled by the highest jumps until a total of 12 qualifiers. Because only six men cleared 5.70 metres, raising the bar to 5.75 metres was unnecessary.

Rank	Group	Athlete	Nation	5.25	5.40	5.55	5.65	5.70	Height	Notes
1	B	Nick Hysong	United States	–	–	o	o	o	5.70	q
2	B	Danny Ecker	Germany	–	–	xo	–	o	5.70	q
3	A	Dmitriy Markov	Australia	–	–	o	–	xo	5.70	q
4	A	Viktor Chistiakov	Australia	–	o	xo	xxo	xo	5.70	q
5	B	Michael Stolle	Germany	–	–	o	–	xxo	5.70	q
6	B	Giuseppe Gibilisco	Italy	–	o	xo	o	xxo	5.70	q
7	A	Yevgeniy Smiryagin	Russia	–	o	o	o	xx–	5.65	q
7	A	Tim Lobinger	Germany	–	o	o	o	x–	5.65	q
7	B	Okkert Brits	South Africa	–	–	o	o	–	5.65	q
7	B	Alexander Averbukh	Israel	–	–	o	o	–	5.65	q
7	B	Maksim Tarasov	Russia	–	–	–	o	–	5.65	q
12	A	Lawrence Johnson	United States	–	–	xo	o	–	5.65	q
12	A	Montxu Miranda	Spain	–	xo	o	o	xxx	5.65	q
14	A	Štěpán Janáček	Czech Republic	–	xxo	o	o	xxx	5.65	
15	A	Rens Blom	Netherlands	–	o	o	xo	xxx	5.65	
16	A	Jean Galfione	France	–	o	o	xxx	—N/a	5.55	
16	B	Paul Burgess	Australia	–	o	o	xxx	—N/a	5.55	
16	B	Kevin Hughes	Great Britain	o	o	o	xxx	—N/a	5.55	SB
16	B	Javier García	Spain	–	o	o	xx–	x	5.55	
20	A	Patrik Kristiansson	Sweden	–	o	xo	xxx	—N/a	5.55	
20	A	Danny Krasnov	Israel	–	o	xo	xxx	—N/a	5.55	SB
22	A	Thibaut Duval	Belgium	–	xo	xxo	xxx	—N/a	5.55	
22	B	Ilian Efremov	Bulgaria	o	xo	xxo	–	xxx	5.55	
22	B	Martin Eriksson	Sweden	–	xo	xxo	xxx	—N/a	5.55	
25	B	Manabu Yokoyama	Japan	–	xxo	xxo	xxx	—N/a	5.55	
26	A	Pavel Gerasimov	Russia	–	xo	–	xxx	—N/a	5.40	
26	B	Chad Harting	United States	–	xo	x–	xx	—N/a	5.40	
26	B	Dominic Johnson	Saint Lucia	–	xo	xxx	—N/a		5.40	
29	B	João André	Portugal	xo	xo	xxx	—N/a		5.40	
30	B	Denys Yurchenko	Ukraine	–	xxo	–	x–	—N/a	5.40	
30	B	Romain Mesnil	France	–	xxo	x–	xx	—N/a	5.40	
32	A	Nuno Fernandes	Portugal	xxo	xxx	—N/a			5.25	
–	A	Sergey Bubka	Ukraine	–	–	–	–	xxx	No mark	
–	A	Igor Potapovich	Kazakhstan	–	–	xxx	—N/a		No mark	
–	A	Robison Pratt	Mexico	xxx	—N/a				No mark	
–	B	Photis Stefani	Cyprus	xxx	—N/a				No mark	
–	A	Ruhan Işım	Turkey	—N/a					DNS	

=== Final ===
The final was held on Friday 29 September 2000.

Rank	Athlete	Nation	5.50	5.70	5.80	5.90	5.96	Height	Notes
1st place, gold medalist(s)	Nick Hysong	United States	o	xo	o	o	xxx	5.90	PB
2nd place, silver medalist(s)	Lawrence Johnson	United States	–	o	o	xo	xxx	5.90	
3rd place, bronze medalist(s)	Maksim Tarasov	Russia	o	–	xo	xxo	xxx	5.90	SB
4	Michael Stolle	Germany	xxo	o	xo	xxo	xxx	5.90	
5	Viktor Chistiakov	Australia	o	o	o	xxx	—N/a	5.80	SB
5	Dmitriy Markov	Australia	o	–	o	xx–	x	5.80	
7	Okkert Brits	South Africa	–	o	xo	xxx	—N/a	5.80	
8	Danny Ecker	Germany	o	xo	xo	xxx	—N/a	5.80	
9	Montxu Miranda	Spain	o	xxo	xxx	—N/a		5.70	
10	Giuseppe Gibilisco	Italy	o	xxx		—N/a		5.50	
10	Aleksandr Averbukh	Israel	o	xxx	—N/a			5.50	
10	Yevgeniy Smiryagin	Russia	o	xxx	—N/a			5.50	
13	Tim Lobinger	Germany	xo	xxx	—N/a			5.50	
