= 1997 IAAF World Indoor Championships – Men's pole vault =

The men's pole vault event at the 1997 IAAF World Indoor Championships was held on March 7–8.

== Medalists ==
Gold	Silver	Bronze
Igor Potapovich; Kazakhstan	Lawrence Johnson; United States	Maksim Tarasov; Russia

== Results ==
=== Qualification ===
Qualification: 5.70 (Q) or at least 12 best performers (q) qualified for the final.

Rank	Group	Athlete	Nationality	5.30	5.45	5.55	5.65	5.70	Result	Notes
1	A	Riaan Botha	South Africa	–	o	–	xo	o	5.70	Q
2	A	Tim Lobinger	Germany	–	–	o	xo	xo	5.70	Q
3	A	Igor Potapovich	Kazakhstan	–	–	–	o	–	5.65	q
3	B	Okkert Brits	South Africa	–	–	–	o	–	5.65	q
3	B	Maksim Tarasov	Russia	–	–	–	o	–	5.65	q
6	B	Alain Andji	France	xo	–	xo	o	–	5.65	q
7	A	Trond Barthel	Norway	xo	–	xo	xo	xxx	5.65	q
8	B	William Deering	United States	–	–	o	x–	–	5.55	q
8	B	Javier García	Spain	–	o	o	–	–	5.55	q
8	B	Lawrence Johnson	United States	–	–	o	–	x–	5.55	q
11	B	Martin Eriksson	Sweden	xo	–	o	–	–	5.55	q
11	B	Michael Stolle	Germany	xo	o	o	–	–	5.55	q
13	A	Vadim Strogalev	Russia	–	o	xo	xxx		5.55	
14	A	Mårten Ulvsbäck	Sweden	xo	–	xo	xxx		5.55	
15	A	Martin Voss	Denmark	o	o	xxo	xxx		5.55	
16	B	István Bagyula	Hungary	xo	xo	xxx			5.45	
17	A	Montxu Miranda	Spain	o	–	xxx			5.30	
18	A	Sergey Fomenko	Ukraine	xo	xxx				5.30	
18	A	Andrea Giannini	Italy	xo	xxx				5.30	
18	B	Edgar Díaz	Puerto Rico	xo	–	xxx			5.30	
18	B	Fabio Pizzolato	Italy	xo	xxx				5.30	
	A	Konstantin Semyonov	Israel						NM	
	B	Jean-Kersley Gardenne	Mauritius						NM	
	B	Danny Krasnov	Israel						NM	
	A	Christos Pallakis	Greece						DNS	

=== Final ===
Rank	Name	Nationality	5.40	5.55	5.65	5.75	5.80	5.85	5.90	5.95	6.00	Result	Notes
1st place, gold medalist(s)	Igor Potapovich	Kazakhstan	–	–	o	–	–	xx–	o	–	xx–	5.90	AR
2nd place, silver medalist(s)	Lawrence Johnson	United States	–	o	–	o	–	xo	x–	xx		5.85	
3rd place, bronze medalist(s)	Maksim Tarasov	Russia	–	–	xo	–	xo	xxx				5.80	
4	Riaan Botha	South Africa	o	–	o	o	xxx					5.75	PB
5	Tim Lobinger	Germany	–	o	xo	xo	xxx					5.75	PB
6	Okkert Brits	South Africa	–	–	xo	–	xx–	x				5.65	
7	Trond Barthel	Norway	–	xo	xxo	x–	xx					5.65	=NR
8	Javier García	Spain	–	o	xxx							5.55	
8	Michael Stolle	Germany	o	o	xxx							5.55	
10	Martin Eriksson	Sweden	xo	xxo	xxx							5.55	
11	Alain Andji	France	xxo	–	xxx							5.40	
	William Deering	United States										NM	
