= Athletics at the 1995 Summer Universiade – Men's pole vault =

The men's pole vault event at the 1995 Summer Universiade was held on 29–31 August at the Hakatanomori Athletic Stadium in Fukuoka, Japan.

== Medalists ==
Gold	Silver	Bronze
István Bagyula; Hungary	Lawrence Johnson; United States	Nuno Fernandes; Portugal

== Results ==
=== Qualification ===
Qualification: 5.30 m (Q) or at least 12 best (q) qualified for the final.

Rank	Group	Athlete	Nationality	4.40	4.60	4.80	5.00	5.10	5.20	5.30	Result	Notes
1	A	Igor Yanchevskiy	Russia	–	–	–	–	–	–	o	5.30	Q
1	B	José Manuel Arcos	Spain	–	–	–	–	–	o	o	5.30	Q
1	B	Christos Pallakis	Greece	–	–	–	–	–	o	o	5.30	Q
4	B	Fotis Stefani	Cyprus	–	–	–	–	o	xo	o	5.30	Q
5	B	Aleksey Gladkikh	Russia	–	–	–	–	–	–	xo	5.30	Q
5	B	Christian Tamminga	Netherlands	–	–	–	–	–	–	xo	5.30	Q
7	A	Heikki Vääräniemi	Finland	–	–	–	–	–	xo	xo	5.30	Q
7	A	Nuno Fernandes	Portugal	–	–	–	–	–	xo	xo	5.30	Q
9	A	Konstantinos Tsatalos	Greece	–	–	–	xo	–	xo	xo	5.30	Q
10	A	Lawrence Johnson	United States	–	–	–	–	–	–	xxo	5.30	Q
11	A	István Bagyula	Hungary	–	–	–	–	–	xo	xxo	5.30	Q
11	A	Hiroshi Terada	Japan	–	–	–	o	–	xo	xxo	5.30	Q
13	B	Fumiaki Kobayashi	Japan	–	–	–	–	–	o	xxx	5.20	
14	B	Adrian Barei	Australia	–	–	xxo	xxo	–	o	xxx	5.20	
15	B	Jean-Michel Godard	France	–	–	–	–	–	xo	xxx	5.20	
16	A	Tibor Csebits	Switzerland	–	–	–	o	–	xxo	xxx	5.20	
17	A	Curtis Heywood	Canada	–	–	–	–	o	xxx		5.10	
18	A	Cristián Aspillaga	Chile	–	–	o	o	–	xxx		5.00	
19	B	Rob Pike	Canada	–	–	–	xo	–	xxx		5.00	
20	A	Paul Williamson	Great Britain	–	o	–	xxx				4.60	
	A	Michael Holloway	United States	–	–	–	–	–	xxx		NM	
	B	Jurij Rovan	Slovenia	–	–	xxx					NM	
	B	Aisea Tukutau	Tonga	xxx							NM	

=== Final ===
Rank	Athlete	Nationality	5.00	5.20	5.30	5.35	5.40	5.50	5.55	5.60	5.65	5.70	5.81	Result	Notes
1st place, gold medalist(s)	István Bagyula	Hungary	–	–	o	–	xo	o	–	o	–	xxo	xxx	5.70	
2nd place, silver medalist(s)	Lawrence Johnson	United States	–	–	–	–	o	o	–	xo	–	xxx		5.60	
3rd place, bronze medalist(s)	Nuno Fernandes	Portugal	–	–	–	xo	–	–	xo	–	xxx			5.55	
4	Igor Yanchevskiy	Russia	–	–	xo	–	–	o	–	xxx				5.50	
5	Aleksey Gladkikh	Russia	–	–	o	–	–	xo	–	xxx				5.50	
6	José Manuel Arcos	Spain	–	–	xo	–	–	x–	xx					5.30	
7	Christos Pallakis	Greece	–	xo	–	–	xxx							5.20	
7	Fotis Stefani	Cyprus	–	xo	–	xxx								5.20	
9	Hiroshi Terada	Japan	o	xxx										5.00	
	Christian Tamminga	Netherlands	–	xxx										NM	
	Konstantinos Tsatalos	Greece	xxx											NM	
	Heikki Vääräniemi	Finland	–	–	–	xxx								NM	
