= Jean Galfione =

French pole vaulter and sailor

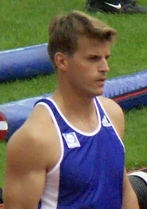

Personal information
- Born: 9 June 1971 (age 55) Paris, France
- Height: 1.84 m (6 ft 0 in)
- Weight: 82 kg (181 lb)

Sport
- Country: France
- Sport: Athletics
- Event: Pole Vault
- Club: Stade français
- Coached by: Maurice Houvion

Achievements and titles
- Personal bests: Pole vault outdoor: 5.98 m (23 July 1999); Pole vault indoor: 6.00 m (6 March 1999)
Medal record
Men's athletics
Representing France
Olympic Games
Gold medal – first place	1996 Atlanta	Pole vault
World Championships
Bronze medal – third place	1995 Gothenburg	Pole vault
World Indoor Championships
Gold medal – first place	1999 Maebashi	Pole vault
Bronze medal – third place	1993 Toronto	Pole vault
European Championships
Bronze medal – third place	1994 Helsinki	Pole vault
Bronze medal – third place	1998 Budapest	Pole vault
European Indoor Championships
Silver medal – second place	1994 Paris	Pole vault
Universiade
Bronze medal – third place	1993 Buffalo	Pole vault
Goodwill Games
Silver medal – second place	1998 Uniondale	Pole vault
Mediterranean Games
Bronze medal – third place	1993 Narbonne	Pole vault
World Junior Championships
Gold medal – first place	1990 Plovdiv	Pole vault
- Updated on 17 March 2014

Jean Galfione (born 9 June 1971) is a French retired pole vaulter. During his pole vaulting career, he won at least one medal in each of the following major international competitions - the Olympic Games, the World Championships, the World Indoor Championships, the European Championships and the European Indoors Championships

== Pole vaulting career ==
=== Before the 1996 Olympic Games ===
Jean Galfione started pole vaulting as part of the decathlon when he was 13 years old and a member of the Stade français sports club. He was talent-spotted by Maurice Houvion, who was a coach at INSEP. In 1987 he became part of the group of pole vaulters trained by Houvion at INSEP. In 1988, he broke the pole vault national youth record by clearing 5.16 m. In 1990 he won the World Junior Championships pole vault gold medal with a jump of 5.45 m and also broke the pole vault national junior indoor record with a jump of 5.60 m.

Galfione clinched his first Olympic or World Outdoor/Indoor Championships medal when he won the pole vault bronze medal at the 1993 World Indoor Championships.

Galfione won six successive French National Athletics Championships outdoor pole vault titles at the senior level from 1993 to 1998. He also won three French National Athletics Championships indoor pole vault titles at the senior level in 1990, 1993 and 1994.

=== 1996 Olympic Games ===
Galfione achieved the pinnacle of his pole vault career by winning the pole vault gold medal at the 1996 Olympics in Atlanta. In the final of that competition, all the three medallists cleared the same height of 5.92 m. Whereas Galfione and Igor Trandenkov both cleared 5.92 m on their first attempt, Andrei Tivontchik could only clear 5.92 m on his second attempt. Galfione had cleared 5.86 m (the previous highest height) on his first attempt, whereas Trandenkov had two successive misses at 5.86 m and chose to use his third and final attempt to clear 5.92 m instead. Since all these three pole vaulters and no one else had succeeded in clearing 5.92 m, the podium positions were still undecided. All of them subsequently had three consecutive misses in attempting to clear heights greater than 5.92 m, and the contest was therefore declared over. Thus under the tie-breaking rules, Galfione (he had fewer misses in the final than Trandenkov) won the gold medal, with Trandenkov taking the silver and Tivontchik taking the bronze. Galfione's 5.92 m winning clearance was a new Olympic record that was 2 cm higher than the previous Olympic record achieved by Sergey Bubka in the 1988 Olympics pole vault final. "This is one of the most beautiful days of my life," Galfione said right after the end of the competition. "All my hard work and patience have paid off. This is absolutely the result of my hard work. The competition was long and tough, but I recovered very well after every jump."

=== After the 1996 Olympic Games ===
On 6 March 1999, Galfione won the 1999 World Indoor Championships pole vault title, clearing 6.00 m (which equalled Sergey Bubka's championship record set in the 1991 final) in the final. At first, Galfione's clearance at that height was ruled invalid because it appeared that he had illegally touched the bar with his hand. But after the French team lodged an appeal, the decision to rule Galfione's 6.00 m clearance invalid was reversed, and he was declared the winner of the competition. If the original ruling had stood, Jeff Hartwig would have been the winner. Later in that competition, Galfione had three consecutive misses at 6.05 m. Galfione thus became the first Frenchman to clear 6 metres or more indoors or outdoors in the pole vault. He also became only the fourth pole vaulter, after Sergey Bubka, Rodion Gataullin and Maksim Tarasov, to clear 6 metres or more indoors. That 6.00 m mark would remain as the French national indoor pole vault record for 12 years until 5 March 2011, when Renaud Lavillenie broke it with a jump of 6.03 m in the 2011 European Indoor Championships pole vault final. Galfione held the French national outdoor pole vault record from 1993 to 2009. On 21 June 2009 Renaud Lavillenie broke Galfione's French national outdoor pole vault record of 5.98 m (set in Amiens on 23 July 1999), with a jump of 6.01 m.

From 2000 to 2002, Galfione was plagued with numerous injuries. He underwent surgery on a collapsed lung suffered during an interclub competition in Paris in May 2000. He underwent another operation in July 2002.

Galfione participated in the 2000 Olympics pole vault event in Sydney. In the qualification round, after clearing the bar at 5.40 m and 5.55 m (both at the first attempts), he failed with his three attempts at 5.65 m. He finished the qualification round in joint 16th position and did not qualify for the final.

Galfione could not take part in the 2004 Olympics because he failed to clear the minimum Olympic qualifying height.

Galfione retired from pole vaulting in 2005.

== Later life ==
Galfione has been practising sailing competitively since 2007. Among the sailing races that he has participated in are: the 2007 Louis Vuitton Cup and the 2012 Solidaire du Chocolat.

Galfione also worked as an athletics commentator and consultant for Canal Plus and presented documentaries for the French television channel, Voyage.

== Family ==
Jean Galfione comes from a sporting family.

Both his parents were sportspersons. His father (Serge) was a fencer and his mother (Michèle, Serge's wife) was a gymnast who was a French national junior gymnastics champion.

Jean Galfione has one brother (Olivier, who is an actor) and one sister (Sophie, who is a model), and is a nephew of an Olympic medal-winning fencer, Jean-Claude Magnan. He and Clothilde Magnan, Jean-Claude Magnan's daughter and who was also a fencer, are thus first cousins.

On 14 May 2013, Jean Galfione's companion since 2011, Cathy, gave birth to a baby girl, Rose. Rose was Galfione's first child.

== International competitions ==
- Only the position and height in the final are indicated, unless otherwise stated. (q) means the athlete did not qualify for the final, with the overall position and height in the qualification round indicated.

Year	Competition	Venue	Position	Notes
Representing France
1989	European Junior Championships	Varaždin, Yugoslavia	9th	5.10 m
1990	World Junior Championships	Plovdiv, Bulgaria	1st	5.45 m
1991	World Indoor Championships	Seville, Spain	12th	5.40 m
1991	World Championships	Tokyo, Japan	10th	5.40 m
1992	European Indoor Championships	Genoa, Italy	4th	5.60 m
1992	Olympic Games	Barcelona, Spain	13th (q)	5.50 m
1993	World Indoor Championships	Toronto, Canada	3rd	5.80 m
1993	Mediterranean Games	Narbonne, France	3rd	5.35 m
1993	Universiade	Buffalo, United States	3rd	5.60 m
1993	World Championships	Stuttgart, Germany	8th	5.70 m
1994	European Indoor Championships	Paris, France	2nd	5.80 m
1994	European Cup	Birmingham, United Kingdom	1st	5.70 m
1994	European Championships	Helsinki, Finland	3rd	5.85 m
1994	World Cup	London, United Kingdom	2nd	5.75 m
1995	World Championships	Gothenburg, Sweden	3rd	5.86 m
1996	European Indoor Championships	Stockholm, Sweden	(q)	NM
1996	Olympic Games	Atlanta, United States	1st	5.92 m (OR)
1997	European Cup	Munich, Germany	2nd	5.75 m
1997	World Championships	Athens, Greece	12th	NM
1998	European Indoor Championships	Valencia, Spain	8th	5.50 m
1998	Goodwill Games	Uniondale, United States	2nd	5.80 m
1998	European Championships	Budapest, Hungary	3rd	5.76 m
1998	Grand Prix Final	Moscow, Russia	2nd	5.90 m
1999	World Indoor Championships	Maebashi, Japan	1st	6.00 m
1999	World Championships	Seville, Spain	11th	NM
2000	Olympic Games	Sydney, Australia	16th (q)	5.55 m
2005	European Indoor Championships	Madrid, Spain	6th	5.60 m
2005	World Championships	Helsinki, Finland	13th (q)	5.45 m
2005	Jeux de la Francophonie	Niamey, Niger	11th	NM

== See also ==
- List of pole vaulters who cleared 6 metres or more
- French all-time top lists - Pole vault
