= 1999 IAAF World Indoor Championships – Men's pole vault =

The men's pole vault event at the 1999 IAAF World Indoor Championships was held on March 6.

== Results ==
Rank	Athlete	Nationality	5.50	5.70	5.80	5.85	5.90	5.95	6.00	6.05	Result	Notes
1st place, gold medalist(s)	Jean Galfione	France	o	o	–	xxo	xxo	x–	xo	xxx	6.00	CR
2nd place, silver medalist(s)	Jeff Hartwig	United States	xo	o	o	xxo	o	o	xxx		5.95	AR
3rd place, bronze medalist(s)	Danny Ecker	Germany	o	o	o	o	xxx				5.85	
4	José Manuel Arcos	Spain	o	o	xxx						5.70	
4	Igor Potapovich	Kazakhstan	–	o	–	–	xx–	x			5.70	SB
6	Romain Mesnil	France	xo	o	xxx						5.70	
6	Andrei Tivontchik	Germany	xo	o	xxx						5.70	
8	Nick Hysong	United States	xxo	xxx							5.50	
	Nick Buckfield	Great Britain	xxx								NM	
	Fumiaki Kobayashi	Japan	xxx								NM	
