= Michael Stolle =

German pole vaulter

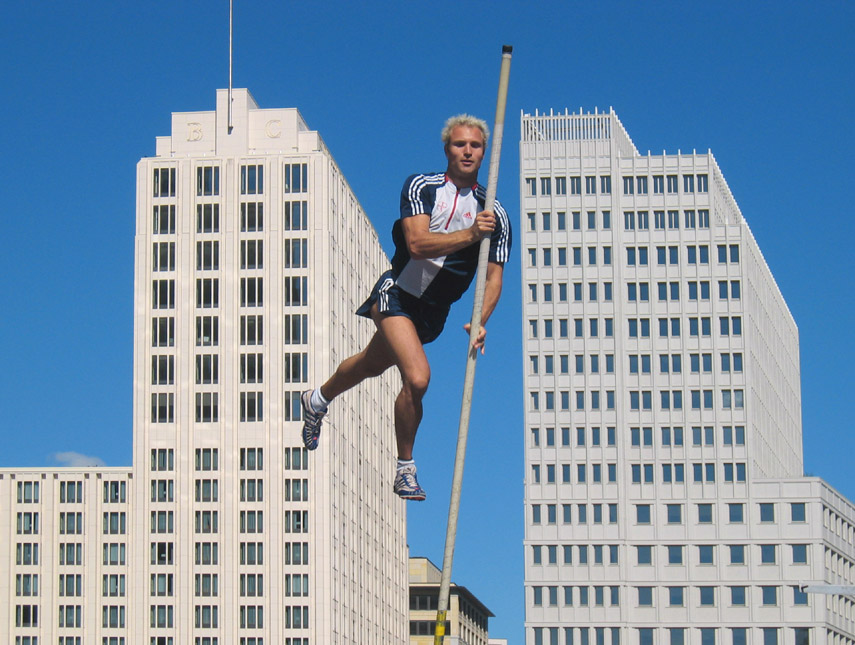
Michael Stolle pole vaulting at the Potsdamer Platz in Berlin 2004

Michael Stolle (born 17 December 1974 in Buxtehude) is a German pole vaulter.

His personal best was 5.95 metres, achieved in August 2000 in Monaco. This ranks him third among German pole vaulters, only behind Tim Lobinger and Andrei Tivontchik.

== Competition record ==
| Year | Competition | Venue | Position | Notes |
Representing Germany
| 1992 | World Junior Championships | Seoul, South Korea | – | NM |
| 1993 | European Junior Championships | San Sebastián, Spain | – | NM |
| 1994 | European Indoor Championships | Paris, France | 19th (q) | 5.20 m |
| 1996 | European Indoor Championships | Stockholm, Sweden | 8th | 5.45 m |
| 1996 | Olympic Games | Atlanta, United States | 9th | 5.70 m |
| 1997 | World Indoor Championships | Paris, France | 8th | 5.55 m |
| 1997 | World Championships | Athens, Greece | 17th (q) | 5.60 m |
| 1998 | European Indoor Championships | Valencia, Spain | 2nd | 5.80 m |
| 1999 | Military World Games | Zagreb, Croatia | 2nd | |
| 1999 | World Championships | Seville, Spain | 7th | 5.70 m |
| 2000 | Olympic Games | Sydney, Australia | 4th | 5.90 m |
| 2001 | World Indoor Championships | Lisbon, Portugal | 9th | 5.45 m |
| 2001 | World Championships | Edmonton, Canada | 4th | 5.85 m |
| 2003 | World Indoor Championships | Birmingham, United Kingdom | 2nd | 5.75 m |
