= Athletics at the 1994 Commonwealth Games – Men's pole vault =

Men's pole vault at the Commonwealth Games

The men's pole vault event at the 1994 Commonwealth Games was held on 19 August at the Centennial Stadium in Victoria, British Columbia.

== Results ==
Rank	Name	Nationality	4.20	4.40	4.80	5.00	5.10	5.20	5.30	5.40	5.50	5.55	Result	Notes
1st place, gold medalist(s)	Neil Winter	Wales						o	–	o	–	xxx	5.40	GR
2nd place, silver medalist(s)	Curtis Heywood	Canada											5.30	
3rd place, bronze medalist(s)	James Miller	Australia											5.30	
4	Photis Stephani	Cyprus											5.30	
5	Mike Edwards	England											5.20	
6	Andrew Ashurst	England											5.20	
7	Greg Halliday	Australia											5.20	
8	Nick Buckfield	England											5.20	
9	Jeff Miller	Canada	–	–	xo	o	xo	xxo					5.20	
10	Owen Clements	Canada	–	–	o	o	–	xxx					5.00	
11	Demigo Kapal	Brunei											4.20	
	Riaan Botha	South Africa	–	–	–	–	–	xxx					NM	
	Okkert Brits	South Africa	–	–	–	–	–	–	–	–	xxx		NM	
	Adam Steinhardt	Australia											NM	
