= Riaan Botha =

South African pole vaulter (born 1970)

Medal record

Men's athletics

Representing South Africa

African Championships
| Silver medal – second place | 1993 Durban | Pole vault |
| Bronze medal – third place | 1992 Belle Vue Harel | Pole vault |

Riaan Botha (born 8 November 1970 in Pretoria) is a retired South African pole vaulter.

His personal best is 5.91 metres, achieved in April 1997 in Pretoria. This places him second on the African all-time performers list, behind fellow South African Okkert Brits.

== Achievements ==
| Year | Competition | Venue | Position | Notes |
Representing South Africa
| 1992 | African Championships | Belle Vue Maurel, Mauritius | 3rd | 5.20 m |
| 1993 | African Championships | Durban, South Africa | 2nd | 5.20 m |
| 1994 | Commonwealth Games | Victoria, Canada | – | NM |
| 1995 | World Championships | Gothenburg, Sweden | 19th (q) | 5.40 m |
| 1996 | Olympic Games | Atlanta, United States | 14th | 5.60 m |
| 1997 | World Indoor Championships | Paris, France | 4th | 5.75 m |
| 1997 | World Championships | Athens, Greece | 10th (q) | 5.70 m |
| 1998 | World Cup | Johannesburg, South Africa | 5th | 5.60 m |
| 1998 | Commonwealth Games | Kuala Lumpur, Malaysia | 1st | 5.60 m |
| 1999 | All-Africa Games | Johannesburg, South Africa | – | NM |
