= Athletics at the 2002 Commonwealth Games – Men's pole vault =

Men's pole vault at the Commonwealth Games

The men's pole vault event at the 2002 Commonwealth Games was held on 30 July.

== Results ==
Rank	Athlete	Nationality	4.90	5.05	5.20	5.35	5.50	5.60	5.70	5.75	5.80	Result	Notes
1st place, gold medalist(s)	Okkert Brits	South Africa	–	–	–	o	o	o	xo	o	xxx	5.75	GR
2nd place, silver medalist(s)	Paul Burgess	Australia	–	–	xo	xo	o	o	o	x–	xx	5.70	
3rd place, bronze medalist(s)	Dominic Johnson	Saint Lucia	–	–	–	o	o	o	xxx			5.60	
4	Nick Buckfield	England	–	–	–	o	o	xxx				5.50	SB
4	Viktor Chistiakov	Australia	–	–	–	–	o	–	xxx			5.50	
4	Dmitri Markov	Australia	–	–	–	–	o	–	xxx			5.50	
7	Tim Thomas	Wales	o	o	xxo	xxx						5.20	
8	Kevin Hughes	England	–	o	xxx							5.05	
9	Tedd Teh	Malaysia	xxo	xxx								4.90	
	Paul Williamson	England	–	–	xxx							NM	
