= Pole Vault Summit =

Annual pole vault competition

The Pole Vault Summit, alternatively called the National Pole Vault Summit, by the sponsor's named UCS Spirit National Pole Vault Summit or geographically the Reno Pole Vault Summit is an annual festival of pole vaulting. Since 2011, the event has been held in the Reno-Sparks Livestock Event Center (a different venue from the Reno Events Center in downtown) located in Reno, Nevada. For the first twenty years of its existence, the event was held in a hotel ballroom, primarily at the Reno Hilton Hotel.

Held in January, the indoor event features lectures, instruction, promoting safety in the sport of pole vaulting, and hosts competitions in all levels of pole vaulting from beginners to the elite. The event has been attended by a virtual who's who of the pole vault community. In 2018, Armand Duplantis set the world junior record in the competition. Shawnacy Barber joined the 6 meters club there in 2016.

The 2020 event was held on January 18, 2020 and 1,168 pole vaulters competed. The event center was covered with 15 pole vault runways and landing mats, and 6 sessions were held between Friday and Saturday for a total of 85 competitions (average flight size of 14). The meet is held by UCS Spirit and the meet directors are Steve Chappel and Lane Mastretti.

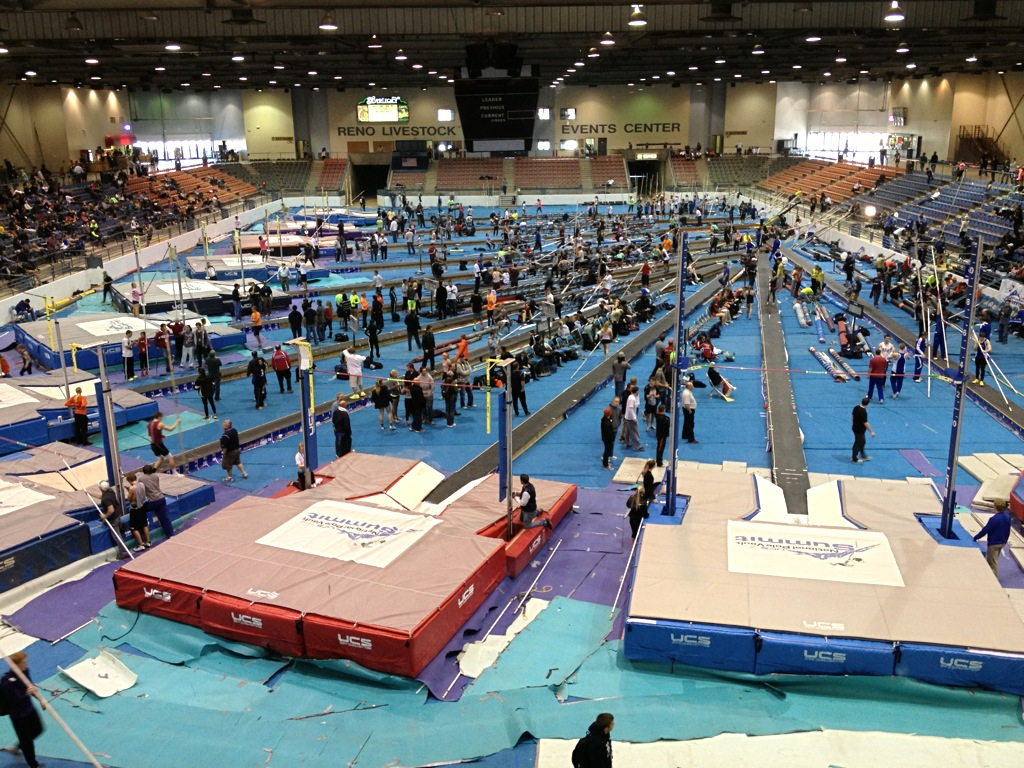
2016 UCS Spirt National Pole Vault Summit at Reno (NV) Livestock Events Center

The 2022 summit was held on January 14 and 15, 2022. The event center had a total of 12 pole vault runways and landing pads, and there were 6 sessions held between Friday and Saturday for a total of 60 total competitions. On the first day, high school vaulters got the chance to sit at a round table with some of the best vaulters in the world and ask them various questions about life, pole vault, and more. After that, the elite vaulters competed with KC Lightfoot coming in first for the elite men's division with a vault of 5.91 meters and Katie Nageotte coming in first place for the elite women's division with a vault of 4.60 meters.
