= Danny Krasnov =

Israeli pole vaulter

Yevgeniy Krasnov
Personal information
- Native name: דני קרסנוב
- Nickname: Danny Krasnov
- Nationality: Israel
- Born: May 27, 1970 (age 56) Moscow, Russian SFSR

Sport
- Sport: Athletics
- Event: Pole vault

Achievements and titles
- Personal best: Pole vault: 5.75 metres (1994)

Yevgeniy ("Danny") Krasnov (Hebrew: דני קרסנוב; born 27 May 1970 in Moscow, Russian SFSR) is a retired Israeli pole vaulter. He emigrated from the Soviet Union in 1991.

His personal best is 5.75 metres, achieved in August 1994 in Brussels. The current Israeli record belongs to Aleksandr Averbukh with 5.93 metres.

== Achievements ==
Year	Competition	Venue	Position	Notes
Representing Israel
1992	European Indoor Championships	Genoa, Italy	17th	5.15 m
1992	Olympic Games	Barcelona, Spain	8th	5.40 m
1993	World Indoor Championships	Toronto, Canada	13th	5.40 m
1993	World Championships	Stuttgart, Germany	18th (q)	5.55 m
1994	European Indoor Championships	Paris, France	7th	5.60 m (NRi)
1994	European Championships	Helsinki, Finland	7th	5.70 m
1995	World Indoor Championships	Barcelona, Spain	14th (q)	5.60 m
1996	European Indoor Championships	Stockholm, Sweden	13th (q)	5.45 m
1996	Olympic Games	Atlanta, United States	11th	5.60 m
1997	World Indoor Championships	Paris, France	–	NM
1997	World Championships	Athens, Greece	9th	5.50 m
1998	European Championships	Budapest, Hungary	–	NM
1999	World Championships	Seville, Spain	9th	5.50 m
2000	Olympic Games	Sydney, Australia	20th (q)	5.55 m
