= Maurilio Mariani =

Italian pole vaulter

Personal information
- Full name: Maurilio Mauro Mariani
- Nationality: Italian
- Born: 22 April 1973 (age 53) Ascoli Piceno, Italy

Sport
- Country: Italy
- Sport: Athletics
- Event: Pole vault

Achievements and titles
- Personal bests: Pole vault: 5.70 m (1999); Pole vault indoor: 5.70 m (2000)
Medal record
World Military Games
Gold medal – first place	1999 Zagreb	Pole vault

Maurilio Mariani (born 22 April 1973) is a retired Italian pole vaulter.

== Biography ==
He won the gold medal at the 1999 Military World Games with 5.70 metres, equalling the championship record set by Jean Galfione. He became Italian champion in 1999, 2000 and 2004. and Italian indoor champion in 1996, 2000 and 2003. He also competed at the 1999 World Championships and the 2000 European Indoor Championships without reaching the final.

His personal best jump was 5.70 metres, achieved three times in 1999, he has 6 caps in national team from 1996 to 2000.

== National titles ==
Maurilio Mariani has won 6 times the individual national championship.

- 3 wins in pole vault (1999, 2000, 2004)
- 3 wins in pole vault indoor (1996, 1999, 2003)

== See also ==
- Italian all-time top lists - Pole vault
