= Vadim Strogalev =

Russian pole vaulter

Vadim Strogalev (Russian: Вадим Строгалёв); born 9 February 1975) is a retired Russian pole vaulter.

He finished seventh at the 1997 World Championships in Athens and ninth at the 2003 World Championships in Paris.

His personal best jump is 5.85 metres, achieved in May 1998 in Chania.

== Competition record ==
Year	Competition	Venue	Position	Notes
Representing Russia
1995	World Indoor Championships	Barcelona, Spain	20th (q)	5.30 m
1997	World Indoor Championships	Paris, France	13th (q)	5.55 m
1997	World Championships	Athens, Greece	7th	5.70 m
1998	Goodwill Games	Uniondale, United States	6th	5.60 m
1998	European Championships	Budapest, Hungary	10th	5.50 m
1999	World Championships	Seville, Spain	19th (q)	5.55 m
2000	European Indoor Championships	Ghent, Belgium	7th	5.40 m
2003	World Championships	Paris, France	9th	5.70 m
2004	Olympic Games	Athens, Greece	–	NM
