= Nuno Fernandes =

Portuguese pole vaulter

Personal information
- Born: 1 April 1969 (age 57) Porto, Portugal

Sport
- Sport: Track and field
Medal record
Representing Portugal
Summer Universiade
Bronze medal – third place	1995 Fukuoka	Pole vault

Francisco Nuno Fernandes (born 1 April 1969) is a retired Portuguese athlete who specialised in pole vaulting. He represented Portugal at three consecutive Summer Olympics, starting in 1992, each time failing to qualify for the final.

His personal record was 5.66 metres outdoors and 5.62 metres indoors, both set in 1996. Those marks stood as national records until being broken by Edi Maia in 2013 and 2012 respectively.

== Competition record ==
Year	Competition	Venue	Position	Event	Notes
Representing Portugal
1989	Universiade	Duisburg, West Germany	18th (q)	Pole vault	4.60 m
1991	Universiade	Sheffield, United Kingdom	19th (q)	Pole vault	5.00 m
1991	Universiade	Sheffield, United Kingdom	9th	Decathlon	6932 pts
1992	Ibero-American Championships	Seville, Spain	2nd	Pole vault	5.30 m
1992	Olympic Games	Barcelona, Spain	29th (q)	Pole vault	5.00 m
1993	Universiade	Buffalo, United States	12th	Pole vault	5.30 m
1993	World Championships	Stuttgart, Germany	36th (q)	Pole vault	5.25 m
1994	European Indoor Championships	Paris, France	–	Pole vault	NM
1994	European Championships	Helsinki, Finland	16th (q)	Pole vault	5.40 m
1994	Ibero-American Championships	Mar del Plata, Argentina	1st	Pole vault	5.15 m
1995	World Indoor Championships	Barcelona, Spain	15th (q)	Pole vault	5.60 m
1995	World Championships	Gothenburg, Sweden	19th (q)	Pole vault	5.40 m
1995	Universiade	Fukuoka, Japan	3rd	Pole vault	5.55 m
1996	European Indoor Championships	Stockholm, Sweden	–	Pole vault	NM
1996	Olympic Games	Atlanta, United States	18th (q)	Pole vault	5.60 m
1997	Universiade	Catania, Italy	8th	Pole vault	5.30 m
1998	Ibero-American Championships	Lisbon, Portugal	2nd	Pole vault	5.55 m
1998	European Championships	Budapest, Hungary	–	Pole vault	NM
2000	Ibero-American Championships	Rio de Janeiro, Brazil	1st	Pole vault	5.20 m
2000	Olympic Games	Sydney, Australia	32nd (q)	Pole vault	5.25 m
2001	World Indoor Championships	Lisbon, Portugal	9th	Pole vault	5.45 m
2002	European Indoor Championships	Vienna, Austria	19th (q)	Pole vault	5.20 m
2002	Ibero-American Championships	Guatemala City, Guatemala	2nd	Pole vault	5.20 m
