= Igor Potapovich =

Kazakhstani pole vaulter

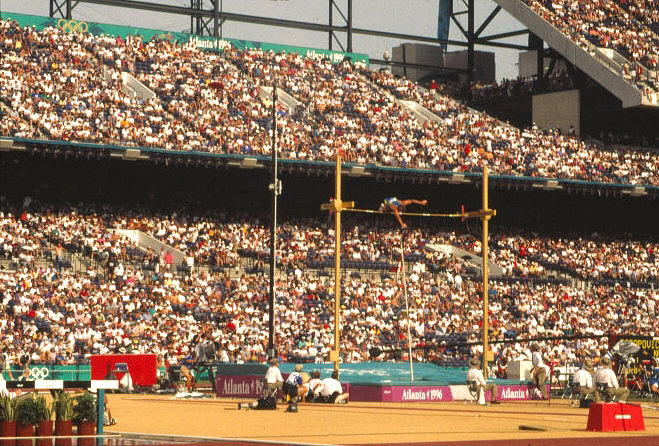
- Potapovich in Atlanta 1996

Personal information
- Born: 6 September 1967 (age 58) Almaty, Kazakhstan
- Height: 185 cm (6 ft 1 in)
- Weight: 75 kg (165 lb)

Sport
- Club: Dynamo Almaty
Medal record
Men's athletics
Representing Kazakhstan
World Indoor Championships
Gold medal – first place	1997 Paris	Pole vault
Silver medal – second place	1995 Barcelona	Pole vault
Asian Championships
Gold medal – first place	1998 Fukuoka	Pole vault
Silver medal – second place	1993 Manila	Pole vault

Igor Potapovich (Игорь Потапович; born 6 September 1967, in Almaty) is a former pole vault athlete from Kazakhstan. Potapovich won his first World Junior Championship in 1986. He won the World Cup in 1992. He also finished second at the 1995 IAAF World Indoor Championships and became the indoor World Champion two years later in 1997.

Potapovich also won the Asian Games in 1994 and the 1998. Potapovich finished 4th at the 1996 Olympic Games and did not make the finals of the 2000 Olympic Games. His personal best was 5.92 metres.

== International competitions ==
Year	Competition	Venue	Position	Notes
Representing the Soviet Union
1986	World Indoor Championships	Athens, Greece	1st	5.50 m
1989	European Indoor Championships	The Hague, Netherlands	2nd	5.75 m
1990	Goodwill Games	Seattle, United States	7th	5.57 m
Representing the Unified Team
1992	World Cup	Havana, Cuba	1st	5.60 m
Representing Kazakhstan
1993	World Indoor Championships	Toronto, Canada	9th	5.50 m
1993	World Championships	Stuttgart, Germany	14th (q)	5.65 m
1993	Asian Championships	Manila, Philippines	2nd	5.50 m
1994	Asian Games	Hiroshima, Japan	1st	5.65 m
1995	World Indoor Championships	Barcelona, Spain	2nd	5.80 m
1995	World Championships	Gothenburg, Sweden	9th	5.60 m
1996	Summer Olympics	Atlanta, United States	4th	5.86 m
1997	World Indoor Championships	Paris, France	1st	5.90 m
1997	World Championships	Athens, Greece	14th (q)	5.60 m
1998	Asian Championships	Fukuoka, Japan	1st	5.55 m
1998	World Cup	Johannesburg, South Africa	4th	5.60 m^{1}
1998	Asian Games	Bangkok, Thailand	1st	5.55 m
1999	World Indoor Championships	Maebashi, Japan	4th	5.70 m
1999	World Championships	Seville, Spain	7th	5.70 m
2000	Summer Olympics	Sydney, Australia	–	NM

^{1}Representing Asia
