= Alain Andji =

French pole vaulter (born 1974)

Personal information
- Born: 20 November 1974 (age 51) Treichville, Ivory Coast
- Height: 187 cm (6 ft 2 in)
- Weight: 89 kg (196 lb)
Medal record
Men's athletics
Representing France
Mediterranean Games
Gold medal – first place	1997 Bari	Pole vault

Alain Andji (born 20 November 1974 in Treichville, Ivory Coast) is a French pole vaulter. He changed nationality from his birth country Ivory Coast.

Andji finished eighth at the 1996 European Indoor Championships, ninth at the 1996 Olympic Games, eleventh at the 1997 World Indoor Championships and first at the 1997 Mediterranean Games.

Before switching to France he set an Ivory Coast national record of 5.10 metres in June 1992 in Yerres. His career best jump was 5.85 metres, achieved in May 1997 in Bonneuil-sur-Marne.

== Competition record ==
Year	Competition	Venue	Position	Notes
Representing France
1994	Jeux de la Francophonie	Paris, France	3rd	5.30 m
1995	World Indoor Championships	Barcelona, Spain	20th (q)	5.30 m
1996	European Indoor Championships	Stockholm, Sweden	8th	5.45 m
1996	Olympic Games	Atlanta, United States	9th	5.70 m
1997	World Indoor Championships	Paris, France	11th	5.40 m
1997	Mediterranean Games	Bari, Italy	1st	5.70 m
1997	World Championships	Athens, Greece	17th (q)	5.60 m

== See also ==
- French all-time top lists - Pole vault
