= Fumiaki Kobayashi (pole vaulter) =

Japanese pole vaulter (born 1974)

Personal information
- Born: 10 December 1974 (age 51)

Sport
- Sport: Track and field
Medal record
Representing Japan
Asian Games
Bronze medal – third place	1998 Bangkok	Pole vault
Bronze medal – third place	2002 Busan	Pole vault
Asian Championships
Bronze medal – third place	1995 Jakarta	Pole vault

Fumiaki Kobayashi (小林 史明, Kobayashi Fumiaki; born 10 December 1974) is a pole vaulter from Japan. His personal best jump is 5.71 metres, achieved in July 2002 in Ichihara.

== Achievements ==
Year	Competition	Venue	Position	Notes
Representing Japan
1995	Asian Championships	Jakarta, Indonesia	3rd	5.10 m
1995	Universiade	Fukuoka, Japan	13th (q)	5.20 m
1998	Asian Games	Bangkok, Thailand	3rd	5.20 m
1999	World Indoor Championships	Maebashi, Japan	–	NM
1999	World Championships	Seville, Spain	–	NM
2002	Asian Games	Busan, South Korea	3rd	5.20 m
2003	World Championships	Paris, France	29th (q)	5.20 m
