= Teruyasu Yonekura =

Japanese pole vaulter (born 1971)

Personal information
- Nationality: Japanese
- Born: 2 January 1971 (age 55)

Sport
- Sport: Athletics
- Event: Pole vault

Teruyasu Yonekura (米倉 照恭, Yonekura Teruyasu; born 2 January 1971) is a Japanese athlete. He competed in the men's pole vault at the 1996 Summer Olympics. He is currently a coach for Nishi Sports.
