= Paul Benavides =

Mexican pole vaulter

Personal information
- Nationality: Mexican/American
- Born: 5 November 1964 (age 60)

Sport
- Sport: Track and field
- Event: Pole vault
- Club: UTEP Miners

Paul Benavides Breu (born 5 November 1964) is a Mexican former pole vaulter.

He finished fourth at the 1995 Pan American Games. He also competed at the 1993 and 1995 World Championships without reaching the final.

His personal best jump was 5.72 metres, achieved in June 1994 in El Paso. This was the Mexican record for many years. It was surpassed by Giovanni Lanaro in 2007.

Benavides won the British AAA Championships title in the pole vault event at the 1990 AAA Championships.
