= 1990 World Junior Championships in Athletics – Men's pole vault =

The men's pole vault event at the 1990 World Junior Championships in Athletics was held in Plovdiv, Bulgaria, at Deveti Septemvri Stadium on 8 and 9 August.

== Medalists ==
Gold	Jean Galfione; France
Silver	Dmitriy Kurkulin; Soviet Union
Bronze	Miroslav Dukov; Bulgaria

== Results ==
=== Final ===
9 August

Rank	Name	Nationality	Result	Notes
1st place, gold medalist(s)	Jean Galfione	France	5.45	
2nd place, silver medalist(s)	Dmitriy Kurkulin	Soviet Union	5.40	
3rd place, bronze medalist(s)	Miroslav Dukov	Bulgaria	5.40	
4	Gérald Baudouin	France	5.30	
5	Alberto Manzano	Cuba	5.30	
6	Nick Hysong	United States	5.30	
7	Daniel Martí	Spain	5.20	
8	Hrístos Pallakis	Greece	5.10	
9	Aleksey Dubenskov	Soviet Union	5.00	
10	Zoltán Bujtor	Hungary	5.00	
11	Mark Buse	United States	4.90	
	Erik Noaksson	Sweden	NH	
	Martin Eriksson	Sweden	NH	

=== Qualifications ===
8 Aug

==== Group A ====
Rank	Name	Nationality	Result	Notes
1	Nick Hysong	United States	5.15	Q
2	Dmitriy Kurkulin	Soviet Union	5.15	Q
3	Alberto Manzano	Cuba	5.15	Q
3	Aleksey Dubenskov	Soviet Union	5.15	Q
5	Miroslav Dukov	Bulgaria	5.10	q
5	Zoltán Bujtor	Hungary	5.10	q
7	Gérald Baudouin	France	5.10	q
8	Martin Eriksson	Sweden	5.10	q
9	Daniel Martí	Spain	5.10	q
10	Jean Galfione	France	5.10	q
10	Mark Buse	United States	5.10	q
12	Hrístos Pallakis	Greece	5.00	q
12	Erik Noaksson	Sweden	5.00	q
14	Greg Halliday	Australia	5.00	
15	Markus Lubbers	Switzerland	4.90	
16	Asparukh Ivanov	Bulgaria	4.80	
17	Alan De Naeyer	Belgium	4.70	
17	Neil Winter	United Kingdom	4.70	
17	Kersley Gardenne	Mauritius	4.70	
20	Tim Lobinger	West Germany	4.70	
	Domitien Mestre	Belgium	NH	
	Dean Mellor	United Kingdom	NH	
	Paul Gibbons	New Zealand	NH	

== Participation ==
According to an unofficial count, 23 athletes from 16 countries participated in the event.

- Australia (1)
- Belgium (2)
- Bulgaria (2)
- Cuba (1)
- France (2)
- Greece (1)
- Hungary (1)
- Mauritius (1)
- New Zealand (1)
- Soviet Union (2)
- Spain (1)
- Sweden (2)
- Switzerland (1)
- United Kingdom (2)
- United States (2)
- West Germany (1)
