= Nick Hysong =

American pole vaulter (born 1971)

Personal information
- Born: December 9, 1971 (age 54) Winslow, Arizona, U.S.
- Height: 1.83 m (6 ft 0 in)
- Weight: 77 kg (170 lb)

Sport
- Country: United States
- Sport: Athletics
- Event: Pole vault

Achievements and titles
- Personal best: 5.90 m (2000)
Medal record
Men's athletics (track and field)
Representing the United States
Olympic Games
Gold medal – first place	2000 Sydney	Pole vault
World Championships
Bronze medal – third place	2001 Edmonton	Pole vault

Nick E. Hysong (born December 9, 1971) is an American athlete competing in the men's pole vault. Best known for winning the Olympic gold medal in 2000 with a personal best jump of 5.90 metres, he also won a bronze medal at the 2001 World Championships in Athletics. Hysong is also a respectable sprinter, having run 100 m in 10.27 s.

== Biography ==
In his final year at Arizona State University in 1994, he won both the Pac-10 and the NCAA championships. He is now coaching pole vaulting team at Shadow Mountain High School for the track and field team. Hysong is also running his own sports performance facility in phoenix Arizona(RISEN Performance – linked below). In 2010 under his private coaching Alex Bishop won the 5A1 Arizona State Championship with a vault of 5 meters, and Liz Portenova won the 5A2 State Championship with a vault of 3.70 meters. In 2012 Hysong's RISEN Performance had two exceptional male vaulters: Grant Sisserson pole vaulted 16' and had a 3rd-place finish at The State Championships, and Cole Walsh pole vaulted 16' 5" to win the Arizona Meet of Champion's (Walsh finished 2nd at the State Champs with a vault of 16' 3").

== Achievements ==
Year	Competition	Venue	Position	Event	Notes
Representing the United States
1990	World Junior Championships	Plovdiv, Bulgaria	6th	Pole vault	5.30 m
1995	World Indoor Championships	Barcelona, Spain	5th	Pole vault	5.70 m
1999	World Indoor Championships	Maebashi, Japan	8th	Pole vault	5.50 m
1999	World Championships	Seville, Spain	4th	Pole vault	5.70 m
1999	IAAF Grand Prix Final	Munich, Germany	4th	Pole vault	5.70 m
2000	Olympic Games	Sydney, Australia	1st	Pole vault	5.90 m
2000	IAAF Grand Prix Final	Doha, Qatar	2nd	Pole vault	5.60 m
2001	World Championships	Edmonton, Alberta	3rd	Pole vault	5.85 m
2005	World Championships	Helsinki, Finland	5th	Pole vault	5.50 m
