= Athletics at the 1993 Summer Universiade – Men's pole vault =

The men's pole vault event at the 1993 Summer Universiade was held at the UB Stadium in Buffalo, United States on 14 and 16 July 1993.

== Medalists ==
Gold	Silver	Bronze
István Bagyula; Hungary	Alberto Giacchetto; Italy	Jean Galfione; France

== Results ==
=== Qualification ===
Rank	Group	Athlete	Nationality	Result	Notes
?	?	Jean Galfione	France	5.20	
?	?	Michael Edwards	Great Britain	5.20	
?	?	István Bagyula	Hungary	5.20	
?	?	José Manuel Arcos	Spain	5.20	
?	?	Daniel Martí	Spain	5.20	
?	?	Mark Buse	United States	5.20	
?	?	Curtis Heywood	Canada	5.20	
8	?	Nuno Fernandes	Portugal	5.20	
?	?	Alberto Giacchetto	Italy	5.20	
?	?	Tim Lobinger	Germany	5.20	
?	?	Martin Amann	Germany	5.10	
?	?	Doug Wood	Canada	5.10	
?	?	Tibor Csebits	Switzerland	5.00	
?	?	Samy Si Mohamed	Algeria	5.00	
?	?	Erik Noaksson	Sweden	5.00	
?	?	Matt Belsham	Great Britain	5.00	

=== Final ===
Rank	Athlete	Nationality	Result	Notes
1st place, gold medalist(s)	István Bagyula	Hungary	5.70	
2nd place, silver medalist(s)	Alberto Giacchetto	Italy	5.60	
3rd place, bronze medalist(s)	Jean Galfione	France	5.60	
4	José Manuel Arcos	Spain	5.50	
4	Martin Amann	Germany	5.50	
6	Mark Buse	United States	5.50	
7	Doug Wood	Canada	5.40	
8	Daniel Martí	Spain	5.40	
9	Michael Edwards	Great Britain	5.40	
10	Tim Lobinger	Germany	5.30	
11	Curtis Heywood	Canada	5.30	
12	Nuno Fernandes	Portugal	5.30	
