= Okkert Brits =

South African track and field athlete

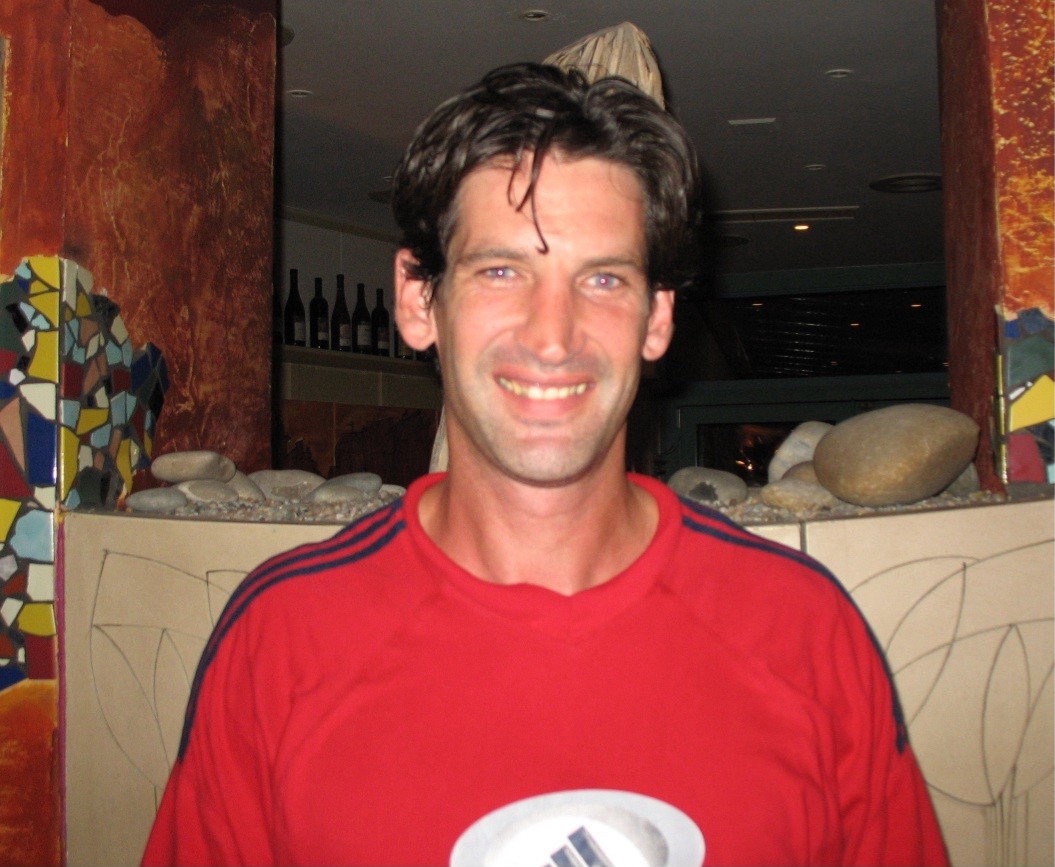

Medal record

Men's athletics

Representing South Africa

World Championships
Silver medal – second place	2003 Paris	Pole vault

World Indoor Championships
Bronze medal – third place	1995 Barcelona	Pole vault

Commonwealth Games
Gold medal – first place	2002 Manchester	Pole vault

All-Africa Games
Gold medal – first place	1995 Harare	Pole vault
Gold medal – first place	1999 Johannesburg	Pole vault

African Championships
Gold medal – first place	1992 Belle Vue Harel	Pole vault
Gold medal – first place	1993 Durban	Pole vault
Gold medal – first place	1998 Dakar	Pole vault
Gold medal – first place	2006 Bambous	Pole vault

Okkert Brits (born 22 August 1973, in Uitenhage) is a former South African track and field athlete who specialised in the pole vault. He was the silver medallist at the World Championships in Athletics in 2003. He was a four-time champion at the African Championships in Athletics and twice champion at the All-Africa Games. He was a gold medallist at the 2002 Commonwealth Games and took bronze at the 1995 IAAF World Indoor Championships.

His personal best of 6.03 m, set in 1995, is the African record. This made him the first African in the 6 metres club of vaulters. He competed in the 1996, 2000 and 2004 Olympic Games finishing seventh in 2000. He ranked number one in the world for the 1995 season.

He has been married to Jane Gillespie since 2003; they are the parents of Sarah Jane Brits (born in 2005) and David Okkert Brits (born in 2006). In 2009, Brits took part in the 3rd season of Survivor: South Africa, placing eighth.

In January 2003, Brits tested positive for a banned substance ephedrine, which he claimed must have been in the energy supplement he took. For its being his first offence and ephedrine only being a stimulant, he was only given a public warning.

== Competition record ==
Year	Competition	Venue	Position	Notes
Representing South Africa
1992	African Championships	Belle Vue Harel, Mauritius	1st	5.35 m
1992	World Junior Championships	Seoul, South Korea	3rd	5.40 m
1993	African Championships	Dakar, Senegal	1st	5.40 m
1993	World Championships	Stuttgart, Germany	15th (q)	5.65 m
1994	Commonwealth Games	Victoria, Canada	–	NM
1995	World Indoor Championships	Barcelona, Spain	3rd	5.75 m
1995	World Championships	Gothenburg, Sweden	4th	5.80 m
1995	All-Africa Games	Harare, Zimbabwe	1st	5.50 m
1996	Olympic Games	Atlanta, United States	–	NM
1997	World Indoor Championships	Paris, France	6th	5.65 m
1997	World Championships	Athens, Greece	–	NM
1998	African Championships	Dakar, Senegal	1st	5.40 m
1999	World Championships	Seville, Spain	10th	5.50 m
1999	All-Africa Games	Johannesburg, South Africa	1st	5.40 m
2000	Olympic Games	Sydney, Australia	7th	5.80 m
2001	World Indoor Championships	Lisbon, Portugal	7th	5.60 m
2002	Commonwealth Games	Manchester, United Kingdom	1st	5.75 m
2003	World Indoor Championships	Birmingham, United Kingdom	–	NM
2003	World Championships	Paris, France	2nd	5.85 m
2004	World Indoor Championships	Budapest, Hungary	9th (q)	5.70 m
2004	Olympic Games	Athens, Greece	19th (q)	5.60 m
2006	African Championships	Bambous, Mauritius	1st	5.20 m

== Survivor South Africa: Santa Carolina ==
In 2010, Brits competed on the third season of Survivor South Africa, Survivor South Africa: Santa Carolina. He made the merge, and ultimately was voted out in 8th place. He cast his jury vote for Perle "GiGi" van Schalkwyk, who ultimately won the competition.

== See also ==
- List of champions of Africa of athletics
- List of doping cases in athletics

Sporting positions
Preceded by Sergey Bubka	Men's Pole Vault Best Year Performance; 1995	Succeeded by Sergey Bubka
