= Juan Gabriel Concepción =

Spanish pole vaulter

Juan Gabriel Concepción Zambrano (born 7 August 1972 in Bérriz, Vizcaya) is a retired Spanish pole vaulter.

He won the silver medal at the 1997 Mediterranean Games. He also competed at the 1996 Olympic Games without reaching the final.

His personal best jump was 5.70 metres, achieved in July 1996 in Barcelona.
