= James Miller (pole vaulter) =

Australian pole vaulter (born 1974)

Personal information
- Nationality: Australian
- Born: 4 June 1974 (age 52)

Sport
- Sport: Track and field
- Event: Pole vault
Medal record
Men's athletics
Representing Australia
Commonwealth Games
Bronze medal – third place	1994 Victoria BC	Men's pole vault

James Miller (born 4 June 1974) is a retired Australian pole vaulter.

He won the bronze medal at the 1994 Commonwealth Games, competed at the 1995 World Championships and he competed at the 1996 Summer Olympics placing 16th.

He became Australian champion in 1993, 1994, 1995, 1996 and 1997. His main domestic competitor was Simon Arkell. His personal best jump was 5.75 metres, achieved in February 1996 in Melbourne.
