= UCS Spirit =

US sport company

- Formerly: United Canvas and Sling, Inc
- Company type: Private
- Industry: Sporting goods
- Founded: 1967; 58 years ago in Hackensack, New Jersey, United States
- Founder: Lou Schwartz
- Headquarters: Minden, Nevada, U.S.
- Area served: Worldwide
- Products: Landing mats; Pole vault poles; Track and field equipment
- Website: ucsspirit.com

UCS Spirit is a company based in Minden, Nevada that specializes in track and field equipment. They are best known for their fiberglass pole vaulting poles. UCS Spirit also sells other track equipment like throwing implements, hurdles, and landing mats. The production and sale of track equipment began in 1987.

== History ==
The company began as Universal Canvas and Sling, Inc. in the late 1960s by Lou Schwartz and his family. Canvas products like awnings and boat covers were made by them in their factory in Hackensack, New Jersey. Son Jeff Schwartz saw an opportunity to create pole vault and high jump landing pits. The company contacted Coach Bill Bowerman of the University of Oregon track and field team. It was agreed upon the pole vault mat would be showcased at the upcoming AAU National Championships. After the meet, Coach Bowerman asked to purchase the mat.

Years later, Universal Canvas and Sling, Inc. was growing as a mat production company when Jeff's brother Larry Schwartz joined the company. The brothers teamed up with Steve Chappell to create a line of pole vaulting poles made of fiberglass material. Chappell and his business partner Lane Maestretti had already been working on pole vaulting poles in Carson City, Nevada. Fiberglass poles were in its infancy at the time. Together the group made the UCS Spirit vaulting pole in 1987. A year later, Sergei Bubka set the first of 12 world records on a UCS pole.

In February 2017, UCS Spirit moved locations from Carson City, Nevada to a 6,000 square foot facility in Minden, Nevada.
