= Scott Huffman =

American pole vaulter (born 1964)

Scott Huffman (born November 30, 1964, in Quinter, Kansas) is a retired American pole vaulter. He competed in the 1988, 1992, and 1996 Olympic Trials, earning a spot as an Olympian on the 1996 Atlanta team. He had a very successful NCAA record at the University of Kansas. He won the American national championships in 1993, 1994 and 1995. At the 1994 US Championships in Knoxville, Tennessee. Huffman set a new American Record of 5.97 meters (19 feet 7 inches), his personal best. The result placed him third in the world on the top performers list that season. Despite his small stature (1.74 m; 5 ft 9 in), Huffman was one of the fastest vaulters in history, having been clocked at 10.0m/second on the runway, a time equalled by former world record holder Sergey Bubka and a small handful of others. Huffman's time in the 40 yard dash was 4.36 seconds (fully automatic timing).

Huffman is notable for his occasional and unpredictable use of a one-legged straddle (similar to a high jumper) method to clear the bar. This technique is commonly called "The Huffman Roll".

== Achievements ==
Year	Competition	Venue	Position	Notes
1991	World Indoor Championships	Seville, Spain	9th	
1993	World Championships	Stuttgart, Germany	5th	
1995	World Championships	Gothenburg, Sweden	6th	
1996	Olympic Games	Atlanta, United States	13th	
