= Tim Lobinger =

German pole vaulter (1972–2023)

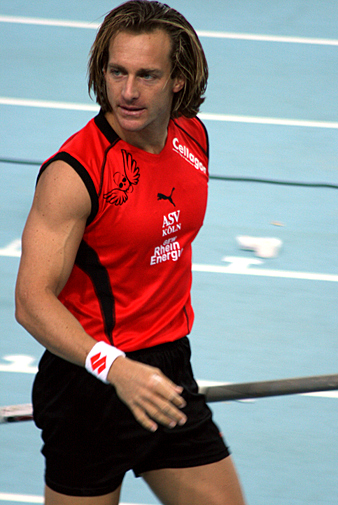
- Lobinger in 2007

Personal information
- Nationality: German
- Born: 3 September 1972 Rheinbach, West Germany
- Died: 16 February 2023 (aged 50) Munich, Germany

Sport
- Country: Germany
- Sport: Athletics
- Event: Pole vault

Achievements and titles
- Personal bests: Pole vault: 6.00 m (1997); Pole vault: 5.95 m i (2000); Decathlon: 7,346 (1999)
Medal record
Men's athletics
Representing Germany
World Indoor Championships
Gold medal – first place	2003 Birmingham	Pole vault
Bronze medal – third place	2006 Moscow	Pole vault
European Championships
Silver medal – second place	1998 Budapest	Pole vault
Silver medal – second place	2006 Gothenburg	Pole vault
Bronze medal – third place	2002 Munich	Pole vault
European Indoor Championships
Gold medal – first place	1998 Valencia	Pole vault
Gold medal – first place	2002 Vienna	Pole vault
Bronze medal – third place	2005 Madrid	Pole vault

Tim Lobinger (3 September 1972 – 16 February 2023) was a German pole vaulter.

== Career ==
Lobinger's discipline was pole vault and he was an elite competitor from the 1990s. His best results came in 1997 and 1999 when he jumped over 6.00 meters, becoming the first German to join the six metres club. His best medals were silver at the 1998 European Athletics Championships and the 2006 European Athletics Championships. He won bronze at the 2002 European Championships in Athletics and the 2006 IAAF World Indoor Championships.

Success eluded him at the Olympics however. In Atlanta in 1996 he placed seventh. In Sydney in 2000 he achieved 13th, and in Athens in 2004, eleventh. At the 2005 World Championships in Helsinki he jumped over only 5.50 meters, well under his abilities.

Lobinger completed a decathlon in 1999 and cleared 5.76 m in the pole vault – a decathlon best for the ten-event contest.

== Personal life and death ==
Lobinger was married to triple jumper Petra Lobinger (née Laux) from 1994 to 2003. He was the father of two children with her, Fee (born 1995) and Tyger (born 1999), the latter of which plays as a professional footballer. He had another son, born in 2016, with Alina Lobinger (née Baumann) from whom he separated in 2017.

On 3 March 2017, Lobinger was diagnosed with multiple myeloma. He died from cancer on 16 February 2023, at the age of 50.

== Achievements ==
Year	Competition	Venue	Position	Notes
Representing West Germany
1990	World Junior Championships	Plovdiv	20th (q)	4.70 m
Representing Germany
1993	Universiade	Buffalo	10th	5.30 m
1993	World Championships	Stuttgart	32nd (q)	5.35 m
1994	European Indoor Championships	Paris	–	NM
1994	European Championships	Helsinki	21st (q)	5.40 m
1995	World Indoor Championships	Barcelona	18th (q)	5.50 m
1995	World Championships	Gothenburg	11th	5.40 m
1996	European Indoor Championships	Stockholm	6th	5.65 m
1996	Olympic Games	Atlanta	7th	5.80 m
1997	World Indoor Championships	Paris	5th	5.75 m
1997	World Championships	Athens	4th	5.80 m
1998	European Indoor Championships	Valencia	1st	5.80 m
1998	European Championships	Budapest	2nd	5.81 m
1999	World Championships	Seville	6th	5.70 m
2000	European Indoor Championships	Ghent	8th	NM
2000	Olympic Games	Sydney	13th	5.50 m
2002	European Indoor Championships	Vienna	1st	5.75 m
2002	European Championships	Munich	3rd	5.80 m
2003	World Indoor Championships	Birmingham	1st	5.80 m
2003	World Championships	Paris	5th	5.80 m
2004	World Indoor Championships	Budapest	5th	5.70 m
2004	Olympic Games	Athens	11th	5.55 m
2005	European Indoor Championships	Madrid	3rd	5.80 m
2005	World Championships	Helsinki	5th	5.50 m
2006	World Indoor Championships	Moscow	3rd	5.60 m
2006	European Championships	Gothenburg	2nd	5.65 m
2007	European Indoor Championships	Birmingham	5th	5.51 m
2007	World Championships	Osaka	8th	5.81 m
2008	World Indoor Championships	Valencia	5th	5.70 m
2008	Olympic Games	Beijing	16th (q)	5.55 m
2011	European Indoor Championships	Paris	8th	5.41 m

== Personal bests ==
Indoor

Individual events
Event	Performance	Location	Date
Pole vault	5.95 m (19 ft 6 1/4 in)	Chemnitz	18 February 2000

Outdoor

Individual events
Event	Performance	Location	Date
Pole vault	6.00 m (19 ft 8 in)	Cologne	24 August 1997

Combined events
Event	Performance	Location	Date	Points
Decathlon	—N/a	Leverkusen	15–16 September 1999	7,346 points
100 metres	11.20	Leverkusen	15 September 1999	817 points
Long jump	6.65 m (21 ft 9 3/4 in)	Leverkusen	15 September 1999	732 points
Shot put	13.08 m (42 ft 10 3/4 in)	Leverkusen	15 September 1999	672 points
High jump	1.97 m (6 ft 5 1/2 in)	Leverkusen	15 September 1999	776 points
400 metres	52.80	Leverkusen	15 September 1999	690 points
110 metres hurdles	14.78	Leverkusen	16 September 1999	876 points
Discus throw	42.86 m (140 ft 7 1/4 in)	Leverkusen	16 September 1999	723 points
Pole vault	5.76 m (18 ft 10 3/4 in)^{[a]}	Leverkusen	16 September 1999	1,152 points
Javelin throw	45.33 m (148 ft 8 1/2 in)	Leverkusen	16 September 1999	520 points
1500 metres	5:32.38	Leverkusen	16 September 1999	388 points
Virtual Best Performance				7,346 points

^{a} Decathlon best

== See also ==
- Germany all-time top lists – Pole vault

Sporting positions
Preceded by (Australia) Dmitriy Markov	Men's Pole vault Best Year Performance alongside Jeff Hartwig (USA); 2002	Succeeded by (France) Romain Mesnil
