= Aleksandr Jucov =

Moldovan pole vaulter

Aleksandr Jucov (born 25 January 1965) is a retired Moldovan pole vaulter.

He competed at the Athletics at the 1996 Olympic Games as well as the European Indoor Championships in 1994 and 1996, but without reaching the final round.

His personal best was 5.75m, achieved in May 1990 in Tbilisi.
