= Viktor Chistiakov =

Russian pole vaulter (born 1975)

Viktor Valentinovich Chistiakov (Russian: Виктор Валeнтинoвич Чистяков; born February 9, 1975, in Moscow) is a Russian pole vaulter. He competed for a period for Australia.

Born the same year as Dmitri Markov, Chistiakov won the 1994 World Junior Championships when Markov placed second. The roles were reversed at the European Indoor Championships.

Chistiakov moved to Australia with his then-wife Tatiana Grigorieva and became an Australian citizen. His personal best is 5.90 metres, and his best Olympic performance was in 2000 when he finished fifth. He is the son of Olympic medalist Natalya Pechonkina.

In mid-2006 he declared he was transferring back to Russia. The move was finalized on 12 February 2007.

== International competitions ==
Year	Competition	Venue	Position	Event	Notes
Representing Russia
1993	European Junior Championships	San Sebastián, Spain	3rd	Pole vault	5.35 m
1994	World Junior Championships	Lisbon, Portugal	1st	Pole vault	5.60 m
1996	European Indoor Championships	Stockholm, Sweden	3rd	Pole vault	5.80 m
Representing Australia
2000	Olympic Games	Sydney, Australia	5th	Pole vault	5.80 m
2001	World Championships	Edmonton, Canada	10th	Pole vault	5.75 m
2002	Commonwealth Games	Manchester, United Kingdom	4th	Pole vault	5.50 m
2002	World Cup	Madrid, Spain	9th	Triple jump	14.96 m
2003	World Indoor Championships	Birmingham, United Kingdom	6th	Pole vault	5.60 m
2003	World Championships	Paris, France	11th	Pole vault	5.60 m
Representing Russia
2009	European Indoor Championships	Turin, Italy	14th	Pole vault	5.40 m
2009	World Championships	Berlin, Germany	10th	Pole vault	5.50 m

== See also ==
- List of eligibility transfers in athletics
