= Yevgeny Smiryagin =

Russian pole vaulter

Personal information
- Nationality: Russian
- Born: 17 May 1976 (age 50)

Sport
- Sport: Athletics
- Event: Pole vault

Yevgeny Smiryagin (born 17 May 1976) is a Russian track and field athlete. He competed in the men's pole vault at the 2000 Summer Olympics.
