= Konstantin Semyonov =

Israeli pole vaulter (born 1969)

Konstantin Semyonov (Hebrew: קונסטנטין סמיונוב; born 20 November 1969 in the Soviet Union) is a retired Israeli pole vaulter.

Before becoming an Israeli citizen he won the bronze medal at the 1992 European Indoor Championships for the Unified Team and became Belarusian national champion in 1993. He then finished eighth at the 1996 European Indoor Championships. He also competed at the 1995 World Championships and the 1996 Summer Olympics without reaching the final.

His personal best is 5.76 metres, achieved in July 1996 in Tel Aviv. The current Israeli record belongs to Aleksandr Averbukh with 5.93 metres.
