= Photis Stephani =

Cypriot pole vaulter (born 1971)

Personal information
- Nationality: Cypriot
- Born: 4 October 1971 (age 55)

Sport
- Sport: Athletics
- Event: Pole vault

Photis Stephani (Greek: Φώτης Στεφανή; born 4 October 1971) is a Cypriot athlete. He competed in the men's pole vault at the 1992 Summer Olympics and the 2000 Summer Olympics.
