= Christos Pallakis =

Greek pole vaulter

Personal information
- Nationality: Greek
- Born: 9 October 1971 (age 54) Athens, Greece

Sport
- Sport: Athletics
- Event: Pole vault

Christos Pallakis (born 9 October 1971) is a Greek athlete. He competed in the men's pole vault at the 1992 Summer Olympics.

Pallakis competed for the Washington State Cougars track and field team in the NCAA.
