= Jeff Hartwig =

American pole vaulter (born 1967)

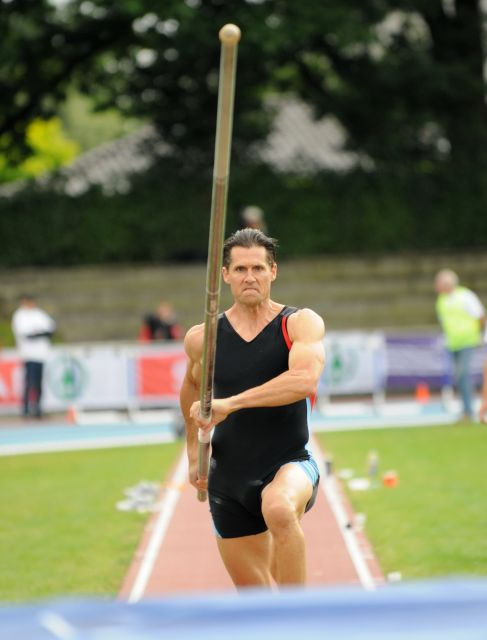

Medal record

Men's athletics

Representing the United States

World Indoor Championships
| Silver medal – second place | Maebashi 1999 | Pole vault |

Jeff Hartwig (born September 25, 1967 in St. Louis, Missouri) is an American pole vaulter.

== Biography ==
In 1998, Hartwig set two North American records with 6.00 m (19 ft 8 in) and 6.01 m (19 ft 8 1/2 in). The latter was an improvement of 16 centimetres from his personal best of 5.85 m (19 ft 2 1/4 in) from 1997. In 1999, he won US national championships by improving his own record to 6.02 m (19 ft 9 in), and his current North American record of 6.03 m (19 ft 9 1/4 in) followed in 2000. Jeff Hartwig held the American record until July 27, 2019, when Sam Kendricks set the American pole vault record by jumping 6.06 m (19 ft 10 1/2 in). His personal best indoor is 6.02 m (19 ft 9 in), also an area record. Only Renaud Lavillenie, Sergey Bubka, Steven Hooker, and current world record holder Armand Duplantis have jumped higher in an indoor competition.

With 5.86 m (19 ft 2 1/2 in) on 4 July 2004, Hartwig broke the world's best performance for men over 35 years; it lasted until 28 February 2024 when Renaud Lavillenie, aged 38, jumped 5.91 m (19 ft 4 1/2 in). He also holds the world's best performance for men over 40 years at 5.70 m (18 ft 8 1/4 in), achieved while placing second at the U.S. Olympic Trials, 29 June 2008.

Hartwig has received the Jim Thorpe Award as the best American field events athlete in 1998 and 1999.

Hartwig vaulted at Francis Howell High School (Weldon Spring, Missouri) and collegiately for Florissant Valley Community College and Arkansas State University. He has trained under the tutelage of USATF Hall of Famer and former world record holder Earl Bell for a number of years. Hartwig has been hired as the pole vault coach for MICDS High School in St. Louis.

Aside from vaulting Hartwig also had another passion, reptiles. For over 15 years Hartwig has been raising reptiles - mostly boas and pythons, but also tortoises, monitors, iguanas, and caimans. Hartwig's first snake was a Burmese python named "Fore", which was given to him by fellow pole vaulter Lane Lohr. It was 1992 when Hartwig decided to give breeding a shot and was very successful in producing 23 baby pythons.

Hartwig raises the snakes to sell to pet stores. Hartwig has been known to have more than 100 snakes on the premises. None of the snakes that Hartwig raises are venomous. In his free time, Hartwig also enjoys visiting zoos and giving presentations to local schools in his former hometown of Jonesboro, Arkansas. Hartwig's coach Earl Bell has referred to him as a 'modern-day Tarzan'.

Hartwig holds the current Masters Track and Field American Records in the M35 and M40 Pole Vault.

== Achievements ==
| Year | Competition | Venue | Position | Notes |
Representing the United States
| 1996 | Olympic Games | Atlanta, United States | 12th | |
| 1998 | Goodwill Games | Uniondale, United States | 1st | 6.01 m AR, =CR |
| 1999 | World Indoor Championships | Maebashi, Japan | 2nd | |
| 2002 | World Cup | Madrid, Spain | 2nd | |
| 2002 | IAAF Grand Prix Final | Paris, France | 1st | |
| 2003 | World Athletics Final | Monte Carlo, Monaco | 4th | |
| 2004 | World Athletics Final | Monte Carlo, Monaco | 6th | |

== Rankings ==
Hartwig has steadily climbed the Track and Field News world rankings, peaking at number 1 in 2002.

| Year | Event | World ranking | US ranking |
|---|---|---|---|
| 1995 | Pole vault | - | 9th |
| 1996 | Pole vault | - | 4th |
| 1997 | Pole vault | - | 5th |
| 1998 | Pole vault | 2nd | 1st |
| 1999 | Pole vault | 2nd | 1st |
| 2000 | Pole vault | 3rd | 2nd |
| 2001 | Pole vault | 2nd | 1st |
| 2002 | Pole vault | 1st | 1st |

== Video Links ==
- Flotrack Interviews of Jeff Hartwig

Sporting positions
| Preceded by (Ukraine) Sergey Bubka | Men's Pole Vault Best Year Performance; 1998 | Succeeded by (Russia) Maxim Tarasov |
| Preceded by (Russia) Maxim Tarasov | Men's Pole Vault Best Year Performance; 2000 | Succeeded by (Australia) Dmitriy Markov |
| Preceded by (Australia) Dmitriy Markov | Men's Pole Vault Best Year Performance alongside Tim Lobinger (GER); 2002 | Succeeded by (France) Romain Mesnil |
