= Heikki Vääräniemi =

Finnish pole vaulter

Personal information
- Born: 21 December 1969 (age 56) Oulu, Finland

Sport
- Sport: Track and field

Heikki Tapio Vääräniemi (born 21 December 1969) is a retired Finnish pole vaulter, who is nicknamed Väärä.

He finished eighth at the 1998 European Championships.

His personal best jump was 5.77 m (18.9 ft), achieved in August 1996 in Helsinki. The Finnish record currently belongs to Jani Lehtonen with 5.82 m (19.1 ft).
