= Maksim Tarasov =

Russian pole vaulter

Personal information
- Native name: Максим Владимирович Тарасов
- Full name: Maksim Vladimirovich Tarasov
- Nationality: Russian
- Born: 2 December 1970 (age 55) Yaroslavl, Soviet Union
- Years active: 1988–2001
- Height: 1.94 m (6 ft 4 in)
- Weight: 80 kg (176 lb)

Sport
- Country: Soviet Union (1988-1991); Unified Team (1992); Russia (1993-2000)
- Sport: Athletics
- Event: Pole vault
- Turned pro: 1988
- Retired: 2000

Achievements and titles
- Personal best: 6.05 m (1999)
Medal record
Men's athletics
Olympic Games
Representing Unified Team
Gold medal – first place	1992 Barcelona	Pole vault
Representing Russia
Bronze medal – third place	2000 Sydney	Pole vault
World Championships
Representing Soviet Union
Bronze medal – third place	1991 Tokyo	Pole vault
Representing Russia
Gold medal – first place	1999 Seville	Pole vault
Silver medal – second place	1995 Gothenburg	Pole vault
Silver medal – second place	1997 Athens	Pole vault
Bronze medal – third place	1993 Stuttgart	Pole vault
European Championships
Gold medal – first place	1998 Budapest	Pole vault

Maksim Vladimirovich Tarasov (Russian: Максим Владимирович Тарасов, born 2 December 1970) is a retired Russian pole vaulter. He is the Russian national record holder for pole vault, with 6.05, result achieved in 1996.

== Biography ==
Tarasov represented the USSR, the Unified Team, and later Russia.

His personal best jump is 6.05 metres, which puts him eighth in the all-time performers list.

Tarasov was the surprise gold medalist at the 1992 Summer Olympics, representing the Unified Team, over favourite Ukrainian teammate Sergey Bubka, who missed all the attempts at the final.

He represented Russia at the 2000 Summer Olympics, winning a bronze medal.

A serious injury forced him to leave competition in 2001.

== Achievements ==
Year	Competition	Venue	Position	Notes
Representing the Soviet Union
1988	World Junior Championships	Sudbury, Canada	2nd	5.60 m
1991	World Championships	Tokyo, Japan	3rd	5.85 m
Representing the Unified Team
1992	Olympic Games	Barcelona, Spain	1st	5.80 m
Representing Russia
1993	World Championships	Stuttgart, Germany	3rd	5.80 m
1995	World Championships	Gothenburg, Sweden	2nd	5.86 m
1996	IAAF Grand Prix Final	Milan, Italy	1st	5.90 m
1997	World Indoor Championships	Paris, France	3rd	5.80 m
1997	World Championships	Athens, Greece	2nd	5.96 m
1998	European Championships	Budapest, Hungary	1st	5.81 m
1999	World Championships	Seville, Spain	1st	6.02 m CR
2000	Olympic Games	Sydney, Australia	3rd	5.90 m

== See also ==
- 6 metres club

Sporting positions
Preceded by (United States) Jeff Hartwig	Men's Pole Vault Best Year Performance; 1999	Succeeded by (United States) Jeff Hartwig
