= Dmitri Markov =

Belarusian-Australian pole vaulter

Personal information
- Native name: Дзьмітры Маркаў
- Nationality: Australian
- Born: 14 March 1975 (age 51) Vitebsk, Byelorussian SSR, Soviet Union
- Height: 182 cm (6 ft 0 in)
- Weight: 82 kg (181 lb)

Sport
- Country: Belarus (1993–1998); Australia (1999–2006)
- Sport: Athletics
- Event: Pole vault

Achievements and titles
- Personal best: 6.05 metres or 19 feet 10 inches (2001)
Medal record
Men's athletics
Representing Australia
World Championships
Gold medal – first place	2001 Edmonton	Pole vault
Silver medal – second place	1999 Seville	Pole vault

Dmitri Markov (Belarusian: Дзьмітры Маркаў; born 14 March 1975 in Vitebsk, Byelorussian SSR) is a retired Belarusian-Australian pole vaulter. He is a former world champion and current Oceanian record holder. His gold medal-winning jump at the 2001 World Championships made him the third person ever (of seven, as of 2021) to clear 6.05 metres or 19 feet 10 inches.

== Biography ==
He originally competed for his birth country Belarus, but fell out with the Belarusian Athletics Federation and refused to compete for the country at the 1998 European Championships. He moved to Australia and was granted citizenship in 1999. He soon set a new Oceanian record in pole vault with 5.95 metres or 19 feet 6 inches having already jumped 6.00 metres or 19 feet 8 inches in 1998 while representing Belarus. He later improved the Oceanic record to 6.05 metres or 19 feet 10 inches, the third person ever to clear that height, as he won the 2001 World Championships.

His best Olympic performance was in 2000 when he finished fifth. His last major competition was the Commonwealth Games in Melbourne, where he won the silver medal with a 5.60 metres or 18 feet 4 inches vault.

He was named Western Australian Sports Star of the Year in 2001. Dmitri was the South Australian 2005-2006 Open Male Athlete of the Year and inducted into the South Australian Hall of Fame in 2007. In 2012 he was inducted into the Athletics Australia Hall of Fame.

Dmitiri Markov announced his retirement in early 2007 due to chronic foot injuries. His last competition was the World Athletics Tour in Melbourne on 2 March 2007.

His son Oleg Markov plays for Collingwood in the Australian Football League and has previously played for Gold Coast and Richmond after being drafted in the 2015 National Draft.

== Achievements ==
Year	Competition	Venue	Position	Notes
Representing Belarus
1994	World Junior Championships	Lisbon, Portugal	2nd	5.50 m
1996	European Indoor Championships	Stockholm, Sweden	1st	5.85 m
1996	Summer Olympics	Atlanta, United States	6th	5.86 m
Representing Australia
1999	World Championships	Sevilla, Spain	2nd	5.90 m
2000	Summer Olympics	Sydney, Australia	=5th	5.80 m
2001	World Championships	Edmonton, Canada	1st	6.05 m
2003	World Championships	Paris, France	4th	5.85 m
2003	World Athletics Final	Monte Carlo, Monaco	3rd	5.76 m
2006	Commonwealth Games	Melbourne, Australia	2nd	5.60 m

== Personal best ==
- Pole Vault: 6.05 metres or 19 feet 10 inches (2001)

== See also ==
- List of nationality transfers in athletics
- List of pole vaulters who reached 6 metres

Sporting positions
Preceded by (United States) Jeff Hartwig	Men's Pole Vault Best Year Performance; 2001	Succeeded by (United States) Jeff Hartwig (Germany) Tim Lobinger
