= Trond Barthel =

Norwegian pole vaulter

Trond Barthel (born 11 September 1970 in Gjøvik) is a retired Norwegian pole vaulter. He represented Gjøvik FIK.

He finished fourth at the 1989 European Junior Championships, seventh at the 1997 IAAF World Indoor Championships and eleventh at the 1997 World Championships. He also competed at the World Championships in 1995 and 1999 without reaching the finals. He became Norwegian champion in the years 1989-1999.

His personal best jump was 5.72 metres, achieved in July 1996 in Halmstad.
