= Sergey Bubka =

Ukrainian pole vaulter (born 1963)

Hero of Ukraine Sergey Bubka
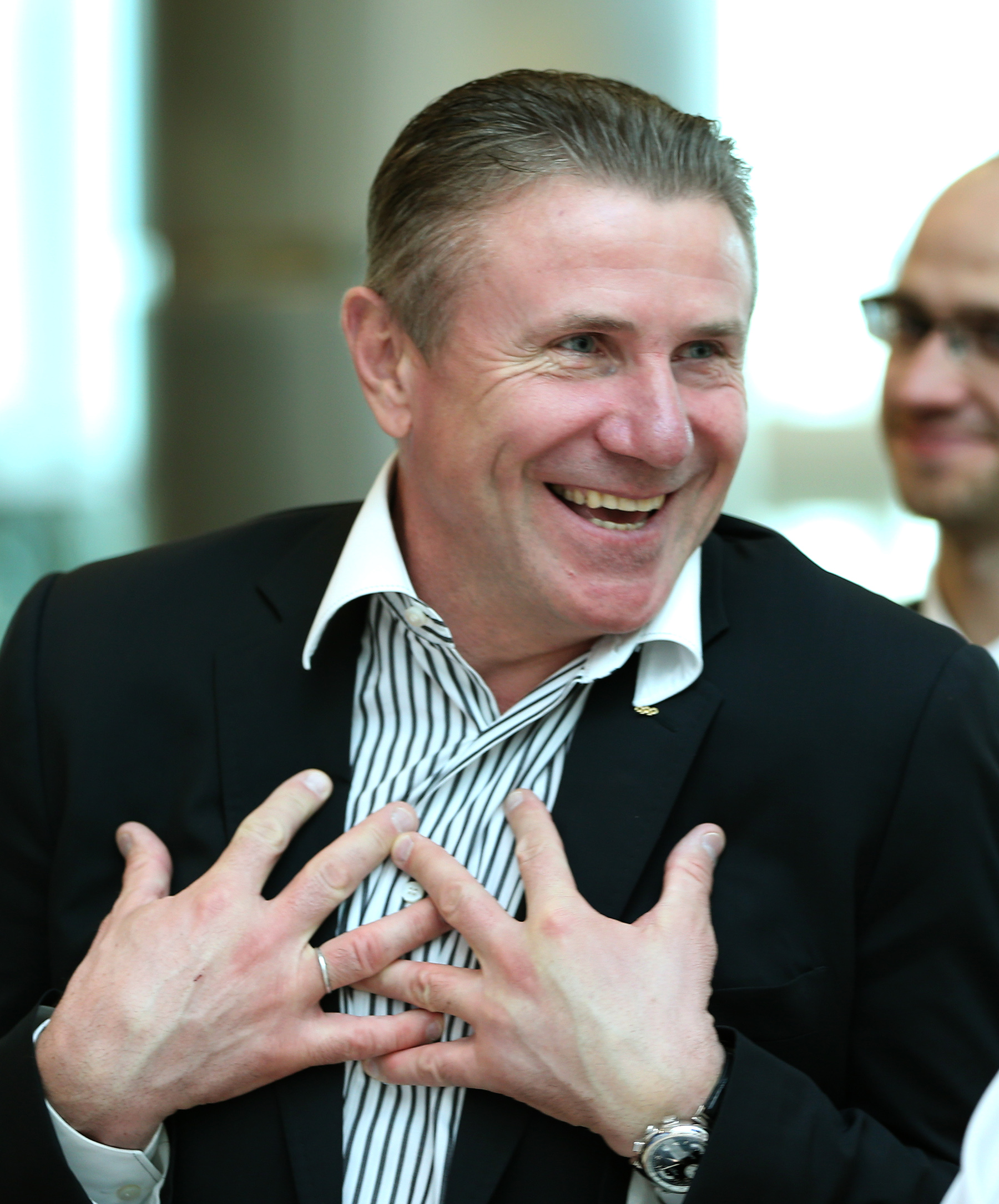
- Bubka in 2013

Personal information
- Native name: Сергій Назарович Бубка
- Full name: Serhiy Nazarovych Bubka
- Nationality: Ukrainian
- Born: 4 December 1963 (age 62) Luhansk, Ukrainian SSR, Soviet Union
- Education: Ukrainian Academy of Pedagogical Science, Kyiv State Institute of Physical Culture
- Years active: 1981–2001
- Height: 1.83 m (6 ft 0 in)
- Weight: 80 kg (176 lb)
- Website: www.sergeybubka.com

Chair of the NOC of Ukraine
- In office 23 June 2005 – 17 November 2022
- Preceded by: Viktor Yanukovych
- Succeeded by: Vadym Gutzeit

Sport
- Country: Soviet Union (1981–1991); Ukraine (1991–2001)
- Sport: Athletics
- Event: Pole vault
- Turned pro: 1981
- Coached by: Vitaly Petrov (first coach)
- Retired: 2001
Medal record
Men's athletics
Event	1st	2nd	3rd
Olympic Games	1	0	0
World Championships	6	0	0
World Indoor Championships	4	0	0
European Championships	1	0	0
European Indoor Championships	1	0	0
Goodwill Games	1	0	1
IAAF Grand Prix Final	7	1	1
IAAF World Cup	1	0	0
European Cup	1	1	0
Total	23	2	2
Representing the Soviet Union
Olympic Games
Gold medal – first place	1988 Seoul	Pole vault
World Championships
Representing the Soviet Union
Gold medal – first place	1983 Helsinki	Pole vault
Gold medal – first place	1987 Rome	Pole vault
Gold medal – first place	1991 Tokyo	Pole vault
Representing Ukraine
Gold medal – first place	1993 Stuttgart	Pole vault
Gold medal – first place	1995 Gothenburg	Pole vault
Gold medal – first place	1997 Athens	Pole vault
World Indoor Championships
Representing the Soviet Union
Gold medal – first place	1985 Paris	Pole vault
Gold medal – first place	1987 Indianapolis	Pole vault
Gold medal – first place	1991 Sevilla	Pole vault
Representing Ukraine
Gold medal – first place	1995 Barcelona	Pole vault
European Championships
Representing the Soviet Union
Gold medal – first place	1986 Stuttgart	Pole vault
European Indoor Championships
Representing the Soviet Union
Gold medal – first place	1985 Athens	Pole vault
Goodwill Games
Representing the Soviet Union
Gold medal – first place	1986 Moscow	Pole vault
Representing Ukraine
Bronze medal – third place	1994 Saint Petersburg	Pole vault
IAAF Grand Prix Final
Representing the Soviet Union
Gold medal – first place	1985 Rome	Pole vault
Gold medal – first place	1987 Brussels	Pole vault
Gold medal – first place	1991 Barcelona	Pole vault
Gold medal – first place	1991 Barcelona	Overall
Bronze medal – third place	1987 Brussels	Overall
Representing Ukraine
Gold medal – first place	1993 London	Pole vault
Gold medal – first place	1993 London	Overall
Gold medal – first place	1997 Fukuoka	Pole vault
Silver medal – second place	1995 Monaco	Pole vault
IAAF World Cup
Representing the Soviet Union
Gold medal – first place	1985 Canberra	Pole vault
European Cup
Representing the Soviet Union
Gold medal – first place	1985 Moscow	Pole vault
Representing Ukraine
Silver medal – second place	1993 Rome	Pole vault
- Updated on 8 September 2012

Serhiy Nazarovych Bubka (Ukrainian: Сергій Назарович Бубка; Serhiy Nazarovych Bubka; born 4 December 1963) is a Ukrainian former pole vaulter. He is the 1988 Olympic Champion, a record six-time consecutive World Champion, a record four-time World Indoor Champion, the 1985 European Indoor Champion, the 1986 European Champion and a seven-time IAAF Grand Prix Final Champion. Bubka broke the world record in men's pole vault a record 35 times (17 outdoors, 18 indoors), and was the first pole vaulter to clear 6.0 meters and 6.10 meters, holding the indoor record of 6.15 meters from 1993 to 2014 and outdoor record of 6.14 meters from 1994 to 2020.

Bubka represented the Soviet Union from 1981 until its dissolution in 1991 and Ukraine thereafter until his retirement in 2001. He was twice named Athlete of the Year by Track & Field News, and in 2012 was one of 24 athletes inducted as inaugural members of the International Association of Athletics Federations Hall of Fame.

Bubka serves as Senior Vice President of the International Association of Athletics Federations (IAAF) since 2007 and served as President of the National Olympic Committee of Ukraine from 2005 to November 2022. He is also an Honorary Member of the International Olympic Committee (IOC), having been involved since 1996. His older brother, Vasiliy Bubka, was also a medal-winning pole vaulter.

== Biography ==
Born in Luhansk, Sergey Nazarovych Bubka was a track-and-field athlete in the 100-meter sprint and the long jump, but became a world-class champion only when he turned to the pole vault. In 1983, he won the world championship in Helsinki, Finland, and the following year set his first world record, clearing 5.85 m (19 ft 2 in). Until the dissolution of the USSR in late 1991, Bubka competed for Soviet teams. By 1992, he was no longer bound to the Soviet system, and signed a contract with Nike. that rewarded each world record performance with special bonuses of $40,000.

From 2002 to 2006, Bubka was a member of the Ukrainian Verkhovna Rada with the Party of Regions group and until 2014 an advisor to Viktor Yanukovych. He was on the youth policy, physical culture, sport and tourism committee while a MVR.

Bubka has been linked to business conducted in Ukraine's Russian-occupied territories. On 5 March 2022, Bubka professed his love for his homeland after the 2022 Russian invasion of Ukraine, and declared: "Ukraine will win".

=== Sporting career ===
Sergey Bubka started competing on the international athletics scene in 1981 when he participated in the European Junior Championship finishing seventh. But the 1983 World Championship held in Helsinki was his actual entry point to the world athletics, where a relatively unknown Bubka snatched the gold, clearing 5.70 meters (18 feet 8 inches). The years that followed witnessed the unparalleled dominance of Bubka, with him setting new records and standards in pole vaulting.

He set his first world record of 5.85m on 26 May 1984 which he improved to 5.88m a week later, and then to 5.90m a month later. He cleared 6.00 meters (19 feet 8 inches) for the first time on 13 July 1985 in Paris. Bubka improved his own record over the next 10 years until he reached his career best and the then world record of 6.14 m (20 feet 1 3/4 inches) in 1994. He vaulted on UCS Spirit poles throughout his later career.

He became the first athlete ever to jump over 6.10 meters, in San Sebastián, Spain in 1991. Bubka increased the world record by 21 centimeters (8 inches) in the period from 1984 to 1994. He cleared 6.00 meters or better on 45 occasions.

Bubka officially retired from pole vault in 2001 during a ceremony at his Pole Vault Stars meeting in Donetsk.

==== Olympics curse ====
The first Olympics after Bubka's introduction to the international athletics was held in 1984 and was boycotted by the USSR along with the majority of other Eastern Bloc countries. In 1988 Bubka competed in the Seoul Olympics and won his only Olympic gold medal clearing 5.90 meters. In 1992 he failed to clear in his first three attempts (5.70, 5.70, 5.75 meters) and was out of the Barcelona Olympics. At the Atlanta Olympics in 1996, a heel injury caused him to withdraw from the competition without any attempts. In 2000 at the Sydney Olympics, he was eliminated from the final after three unsuccessful attempts at 5.70 meters.

=== IAAF World championships ===
Bubka won the pole vault event in six consecutive IAAF World Championships in Athletics in the period from 1983 to 1997:

Year	Competition	Venue	Position	Winning height
1983	World Championships	Helsinki	1st	5.70 m (18 ft 8 7/16 in)
1987	World Championships	Rome	1st	5.85 m (19 ft 2 5/16 in)
1991	World Championships	Tokyo	1st	5.95 m (19 ft 6 1/4 in)
1993	World Championships	Stuttgart	1st	6.00 m (19 ft 8 1/4 in)
1995	World Championships	Gothenburg	1st	5.92 m (19 ft 5 1/16 in)
1997	World Championships	Athens	1st	6.01 m (19 ft 8 5/8 in)

== World record progression ==
Bubka broke the world record for men's pole vault 35 times during his career. He broke the outdoor world record 17 times and the indoor world record 18 times. Bubka lost his outdoor world record only once in his career. After Thierry Vigneron, of France, broke his record on 31 August 1984, at the Golden Gala international track meet in Rome, Bubka subsequently reclaimed the record on his next attempt on the same runway minutes later.

Outdoor
Height	Date	Place
6.14 m (20 ft 1 3/4 in)	31 July 1994	(Italy) Sestriere
6.13 m (20 ft 1 5/16 in)	19 September 1992	(Japan) Tokyo
6.12 m (20 ft 15/16 in)	30 August 1992	(Italy) Padua
6.11 m (20 ft 9/16 in)	13 June 1992	(France) Dijon
6.10 m (20 ft 3/16 in)	5 August 1991	(Sweden) Malmö
6.09 m (19 ft 11 3/4 in)	8 July 1991	(Italy) Formia
6.08 m (19 ft 11 3/8 in)	9 June 1991	(Soviet Union) Moscow
6.07 m (19 ft 11 in)	6 May 1991	(Japan) Shizuoka
6.06 m (19 ft 10 9/16 in)	10 July 1988	(France) Nice
6.05 m (19 ft 10 3/16 in)	9 June 1988	(Czechoslovakia) Bratislava
6.03 m (19 ft 9 3/8 in)	23 June 1987	(Czechoslovakia) Prague
6.01 m (19 ft 8 5/8 in)	8 June 1986	(Soviet Union) Moscow
6.00 m (19 ft 8 1/4 in)	13 June 1985	(France) Paris
5.94 m (19 ft 5 7/8 in)	31 August 1984	(Italy) Rome
5.90 m (19 ft 4 5/16 in)	13 July 1984	(United Kingdom) London
5.88 m (19 ft 3 1/2 in)	2 June 1984	(France) Paris
5.85 m (19 ft 2 5/16 in)	26 May 1984	(Czechoslovakia) Bratislava

Indoor
Height	Date	Place
6.15 m (20 ft 2 1/8 in)	21 February 1993	(Ukraine) Donetsk
6.14 m (20 ft 1 3/4 in)	13 February 1993	(France) Lievin
6.13 m (20 ft 1 5/16 in)	22 February 1992	(Germany) Berlin
6.12 m (20 ft 15/16 in)	23 March 1991	(France) Grenoble
6.11 m (20 ft 9/16 in)	19 March 1991	(Soviet Union) Donetsk
6.10 m (20 ft 3/16 in)	15 March 1991	(Spain) San Sebastián
6.08 m (19 ft 11 3/8 in)	9 February 1991	(Soviet Union) Volgograd
6.05 m (19 ft 10 3/16 in)	17 March 1990	(Soviet Union) Donetsk
6.03 m (19 ft 9 3/8 in)	11 February 1989	(Japan) Osaka
5.97 m (19 ft 7 1/16 in)	17 March 1987	(Italy) Turin
5.96 m (19 ft 6 5/8 in)	15 January 1987	(Japan) Osaka
5.95 m (19 ft 6 1/4 in)	28 February 1986	(United States) New York City
5.94 m (19 ft 5 7/8 in)	21 February 1986	(United States) Inglewood
5.92 m (19 ft 5 1/16 in)	8 February 1986	(Soviet Union) Moscow
5.87 m (19 ft 3 1/8 in)	15 January 1986	(Japan) Osaka
5.83 m (19 ft 1 1/2 in)	10 February 1984	(United States) Inglewood
5.82 m (19 ft 1 1/8 in)	1 February 1984	(Italy) Milan
5.81 m (19 ft 3/4 in)	15 January 1984	(Soviet Union) Vilnius

== Technique ==
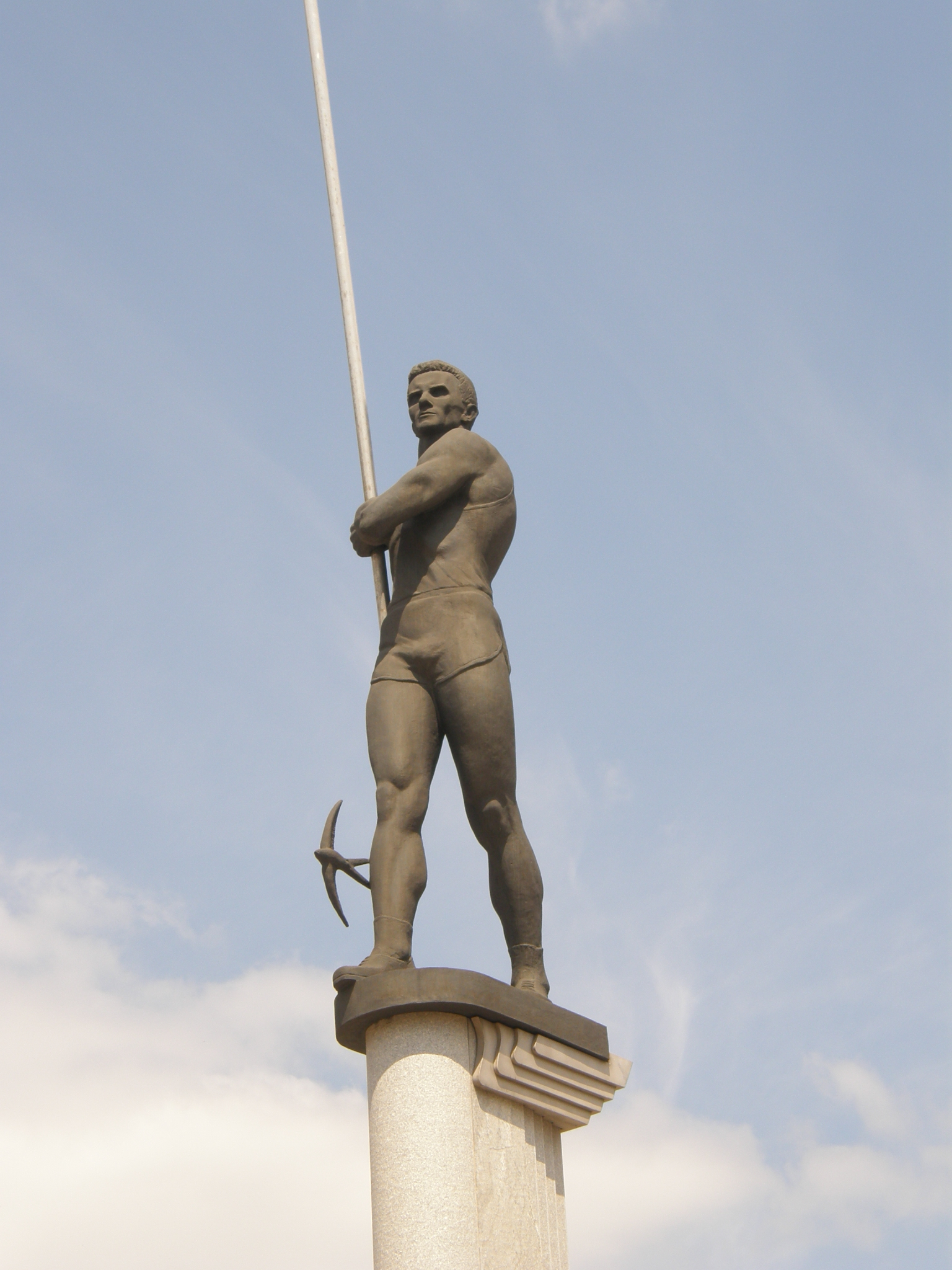
Sergey Bubka statue, Donetsk

Bubka gripped the pole higher than most vaulters to get extra leverage, though Bubka himself played down the effect of grip alone.

His development of the Petrov/Bubka technical model is also considered a key to his success. The Petrov/Bubka model allows the vaulter to continuously put energy into the pole while rising towards the bar. Most conventional models focus on creating maximum bend in the pole before leaving the ground, by planting the pole heavily in the pole vault box. The Petrov/Bubka model follows the technique used by Kjell Isaksson, which concentrates on driving the pole up, rather than bending it while planting it on the landing pad, combined with high running speed. While the traditional models depended on the recoil by bending the pole, the Petrov/Bubka model may exploit the recoil of the pole and exert more energy on the pole during the swinging action.

== Personal life ==
Sergey's son, Sergei Bubka, is a former professional tennis player.

== Recognition ==
- L'Équipe Champion of Champions (1985)
- European Sportsperson of the Year (1985)
- Track & Field News Athlete of the Year (1988)
- Track & Field News Athlete of the Year (1991)
- United Press International Athlete of the Year Award (1991)
- Laureus World Sports Awards discretionary award winner (2008)

== See also ==
- 6 metres club

Civic offices
Preceded by Viktor Yanukovych	President of Ukrainian NOC; 2005–present	Succeeded by Incumbent
Records
Preceded by (France) Thierry Vigneron (France) Thierry Vigneron	Men's Pole Vault World Record Holder; 26 May – 31 August 1984; 31 August 1984 – 15 February 2014	Succeeded by (France) Thierry Vigneron (France) Renaud Lavillenie
Preceded by (United States) Billy Olson (United States) Billy Olson (United States) Joe Dial (United States) Billy Olson (Soviet Union) Rodion Gataulin	Men's Pole Vault Indoor World Record Holder; 15 January – 4 March 1984; 15–17 January 1986; 8 February 1986; 21 February 1986 – 22 January 1989; 11 February 1989 – 15 February 2014	Succeeded by (France) Thierry Vigneron (United States) Billy Olson (United States) Billy Olson (Soviet Union) Rodion Gataulin (France) Renaud Lavillenie
Awards and achievements
Preceded by (United States) Carl Lewis (United States) Michael Johnson	L'Équipe Champion of Champions; 1985; 1997	Succeeded by (Argentina) Diego Maradona (France) Zinedine Zidane
Preceded by (United States) Carl Lewis	Gazzetta dello Sport; Sportsman of the Year; 1985	Succeeded by (Argentina) Diego Maradona
Preceded by (Canada) Ben Johnson (United States) Michael Johnson	Men's Track & Field Athlete of the Year; 1988; 1991	Succeeded by (United States) Roger Kingdom (United States) Kevin Young
Preceded by (Sweden) Stefan Edberg	United Press International; Athlete of the Year; 1991	Succeeded by (United States) Kevin Young
Preceded by (Spain) Alfonso Pons	Prince of Asturias Award for Sports; 1991	Succeeded by (Spain) Miguel Indurain
Sporting positions
Preceded by (France) Thierry Vigneron (Soviet Union) Rodion Gataullin (South Africa) Okkert Brits	Men's Pole Vault Best Year Performance; 1984–1989; 1991–1994; 1996–1997	Succeeded by (Soviet Union) Rodion Gataullin (South Africa) Okkert Brits (United States) Jeff Hartwig
Olympic Games
Preceded by None	Flagbearer for Ukraine; Atlanta 1996	Succeeded by Yevhen Braslavets
