= 2002 European Athletics Championships – Men's pole vault =

Men's pole vault at the European Athletics Championships

The men's pole vault at the 2002 European Athletics Championships were held at the Olympic Stadium on August 8–10.

== Medalists ==
| Gold | Silver | Bronze |
|---|---|---|
| Aleksandr Averbukh; Israel | Lars Börgeling; Germany | Tim Lobinger; Germany |

== Results ==
=== Qualification ===
Qualification: Qualifying Performance 5.75 (Q) or at least 12 best performers (q) advance to the final.

==== Group A ====
| Rank | Name | Nationality | Result | Notes |
|---|---|---|---|---|
| 1 | Lars Börgeling | Germany | 5.60 | q |
| 2 | Patrik Kristiansson | Sweden | 5.60 | q |
| 3 | Pavel Gerasimov | Russia | 5.60 | q |
| 4 | Adam Ptáček | Czech Republic | 5.60 | q |
| 5 | Piotr Buciarski | Denmark | 5.60 | q |
| 6 | Richard Spiegelburg | Germany | 5.45 | |
| 7 | Vesa Rantanen | Finland | 5.25 | |
| 7 | Tom Erik Olsen | Norway | 5.25 | |
| 9 | Jurij Rovan | Slovenia | 5.25 | |
| 9 | Fabio Pizzolato | Italy | 5.25 | |
| 11 | Dennis Kholev | Israel | 5.25 | |
| | Thibaut Duval | France | NM | |

==== Group B ====
| Rank | Name | Nationality | Result | Notes |
|---|---|---|---|---|
| 1 | Štěpán Janáček | Czech Republic | 5.60 | q |
| 2 | Denis Yurchenko | Ukraine | 5.60 | q |
| 3 | Tim Lobinger | Germany | 5.60 | q |
| 4 | Giuseppe Gibilisco | Italy | 5.60 | q |
| 5 | Aleksandr Averbukh | Israel | 5.45 | q |
| 5 | Vasiliy Gorshkov | Russia | 5.45 | q |
| 7 | Oscar Janson | Sweden | 5.45 | q |
| 8 | João André | Portugal | 5.45 | |
| 9 | Mikko Latvala | Finland | 5.25 | |
| 9 | Ilian Efremov | Bulgaria | 5.25 | |
| 11 | Rens Blom | Netherlands | 5.25 | |
| | Romain Mesnil | France | NM | |

=== Final ===
| Rank | Name | Nationality | 5.40 | 5.50 | 5.60 | 5.70 | 5.75 | 5.80 | 5.85 | Result | Notes |
|---|---|---|---|---|---|---|---|---|---|---|---|
| 1st place, gold medalist(s) | Aleksandr Averbukh | Israel | – | – | xo | – | o | xo | o | 5.85 | SB |
| 2nd place, silver medalist(s) | Lars Börgeling | Germany | – | – | xo | – | x– | o | xx– | 5.80 | |
| 3rd place, bronze medalist(s) | Tim Lobinger | Germany | – | o | – | xx– | o | xo | xxx | 5.80 | |
| 4 | Patrik Kristiansson | Sweden | xo | – | xo | xo | o | xo | xxx | 5.80 | |
| 5 | Štěpán Janáček | Czech Republic | xo | o | xo | – | o | xx– | x | 5.75 | |
| 6 | Adam Ptáček | Czech Republic | o | o | xo | o | xxx | | | 5.70 | |
| 6 | Denis Yurchenko | Ukraine | – | xo | – | o | x– | xx | | 5.70 | |
| 8 | Vasiliy Gorshkov | Russia | o | – | xxo | o | x– | xx | | 5.70 | |
| 9 | Oscar Janson | Sweden | o | o | o | xxx | | | | 5.60 | |
| 10 | Giuseppe Gibilisco | Italy | o | – | xxo | – | xxx | | | 5.60 | |
| 11 | Piotr Buciarski | Denmark | – | xo | xxx | | | | | 5.50 | |
| 12 | Pavel Gerasimov | Russia | o | – | xxx | | | | | 5.40 | |
