= 2002 European Athletics Indoor Championships – Men's pole vault =

The men's pole vault event at the 2002 European Athletics Indoor Championships was held on March 1–2.

== Medalists ==
Gold	Silver	Bronze
Tim Lobinger; Germany	Patrik Kristiansson; Sweden	Lars Börgeling; Germany

== Results ==
=== Qualification ===
Qualification: Qualification Performance 2.26 (Q) or at least 8 best performers advanced to the final.

Rank	Athlete	Nationality	5.20	5.40	5.55	5.65	Result	Notes
1	Lars Börgeling	Germany	–	–	xo	o	5.65	Q
2	Thibaut Duval	Belgium	xo	o	o	o	5.65	Q, =NR
3	Piotr Buciarski	Denmark	o	xo	xo	o	5.65	Q
4	Tim Lobinger	Germany	–	–	o	xo	5.65	Q
5	Adam Kolasa	Poland	–	xo	o	xo	5.65	Q
6	Patrik Kristiansson	Sweden	–	o	o	xxo	5.65	Q
7	Richard Spiegelburg	Germany	–	o	o	xxx	5.55	q
8	Pavel Gerasimov	Russia	–	xo	o	xxx	5.55	q
9	Martin Eriksson	Sweden	–	xxo	o	xxx	5.55	
10	Romain Mesnil	France	–	–	xo	xxx	5.55	
10	Yevgeniy Mikhaylichenko	Russia	–	o	xo	xxx	5.55	
12	Yuriy Yeliseyev	Russia	o	o	xxo	xxx	5.55	
13	Denis Kholev	Israel	xo	xo	xxo	xxx	5.55	
14	Nick Buckfield	Great Britain	–	o	xxx		5.40	
14	Štěpán Janáček	Czech Republic	–	o	xxx		5.40	
14	Mikko Latvala	Finland	–	o	x–	xx	5.40	
17	Ruslan Yeremenko	Ukraine	–	xo	–	xxx	5.40	
18	Giuseppe Gibilisco	Italy	–	xxo	xxx		5.40	
19	Massimo Allevi	Italy	o	xxx			5.20	
19	Nuno Fernandes	Portugal	o	xxx			5.20	
19	Tom Erik Olsen	Norway	o	xxx			5.20	
19	Jurij Rovan	Slovenia	o	xxx			5.20	
23	Iliyan Efremov	Bulgaria	xo	–	xxx		5.20	
23	João André	Portugal	xo	xxx			5.20	
	Martin Kysela	Czech Republic	xxx				NM	
	Montxu Miranda	Spain	–	xxx			NM	
	Christian Tamminga	Netherlands	–	–	x–	xx	NM	
	Denys Yurchenko	Ukraine	–	xxx			NM	

=== Final ===
Rank	Athlete	Nationality	5.40	5.50	5.60	5.65	5.70	5.75	5.80	5.85	Result	Notes
1st place, gold medalist(s)	Tim Lobinger	Germany	–	xo	–	–	xo	o	xx–	x	5.75	
2nd place, silver medalist(s)	Patrik Kristiansson	Sweden	–	o	–	o	–	xo	xxx		5.75	NR
3rd place, bronze medalist(s)	Lars Börgeling	Germany	–	o	–	–	xo	xxo	xxx		5.75	
4	Adam Kolasa	Poland	o	–	o	–	xxo	xxx			5.70	=PB
5	Thibaut Duval	Belgium	o	–	xxo	–	xxo	xxx			5.70	NR
6	Pavel Gerasimov	Russia	o	–	xo	–	xxx				5.60	
7	Piotr Buciarski	Denmark	xo	xo	xx–	–	x				5.50	
8	Richard Spiegelburg	Germany	o	–	xxx						5.40	
