= 2001 European Athletics U23 Championships – Men's pole vault =

The men's pole vault event at the 2001 European Athletics U23 Championships was held in Amsterdam, Netherlands, at Olympisch Stadion on 13 and 15 July.

== Medalists ==
Gold	Lars Börgeling; Germany
Silver	Mikko Latvala; Finland
Bronze	Giuseppe Gibilisco; Italy

== Results ==
=== Final ===
15 July

Rank	Name	Nationality	Attempts					Result	Notes
Rank	Name	Nationality	5.30	5.40	5.50	5.60	5.85	Result	Notes
1st place, gold medalist(s)	Lars Börgeling	Germany	–	–	o	xo	xxx	5.60	
2nd place, silver medalist(s)	Mikko Latvala	Finland	o	–	xo	xxx		5.50	
3rd place, bronze medalist(s)	Giuseppe Gibilisco	Italy	xo	–	xo	xxx		5.50	
4	Pierre-Charles Peuf	France	o	xxo	xo	xxx		5.50	
5	Javier Gazol	Spain	o	xxx				5.30	
6	Alhaji Jeng	Sweden	xo	–	xxx			5.30	
7	Adam Ptáček	Czech Republic	xxo	xxx				5.30	
	Filippos Sgouros	Greece	xxx					NM	
	Aleksey Khanafin	Russia	xxx					NM	
	Spas Bukhalov	Bulgaria	xxx					NM	
	Gildas Verbist	France	xxx					NM	
	Yevgeniy Mikhailichenko	Russia	DNS						

=== Qualifications ===
13 July
Qualifying 5.50 or 12 best to the Final

==== Group A ====
Rank	Name	Nationality	Result	Notes
1	Pierre-Charles Peuf	France	5.30	q
2	Adam Ptáček	Czech Republic	5.30	q
2	Javier Gazol	Spain	5.30	q
4	Giuseppe Gibilisco	Italy	5.30	q
5	Yevgeniy Mikhailichenko	Russia	5.15	q
6	Nicholas Durand	France	5.15	
6	Marvin Osei-Tutu	Germany	5.15	
6	Marios Evaggelou	Greece	5.15	
	Thibaut Duval	Belgium	NM	

==== Group B ====
Rank	Name	Nationality	Result	Notes
1	Spas Bukhalov	Bulgaria	5.30	q
1	Filippos Sgouros	Greece	5.30	q
1	Alhaji Jeng	Sweden	5.30	q
4	Aleksey Khanafin	Russia	5.30	q
5	Mikko Latvala	Finland	5.30	q
5	Lars Börgeling	Germany	5.30	q
7	Gildas Verbist	France	5.15	q
8	Tobias Ulrich	Germany	5.15	
9	Robert Villa	Spain	5.00	

== Participation ==
According to an unofficial count, 18 athletes from 11 countries participated in the event.

- Belgium (1)
- Bulgaria (1)
- Czech Republic (1)
- Finland (1)
- France (3)
- Germany (3)
- Greece (2)
- Italy (1)
- Russia (2)
- Spain (2)
- Sweden (1)
