= 2000 European Athletics Indoor Championships – Men's pole vault =

The men's pole vault event at the 2000 European Athletics Indoor Championships was held on February 25–26.

== Medalists ==
Gold	Silver	Bronze
Aleksandr Averbukh; Israel	Martin Eriksson; Sweden	Rens Blom; Netherlands

== Results ==
=== Qualification ===
Qualification: Qualification Performance 5.50 (Q) or at least 8 best performers advanced to the final.

Rank	Athlete	Nationality	Result	Notes
1	Rens Blom	Netherlands	5.50	Q
1	Thibault Duval	Belgium	5.50	Q
1	Tim Lobinger	Germany	5.50	Q
1	Björn Otto	Germany	5.50	Q
1	Richard Spiegelburg	Germany	5.50	Q
6	Martin Eriksson	Sweden	5.50	Q
7	Vadim Strogalev	Russia	5.50	Q
8	Aleksandr Averbukh	Israel	5.40	q
9	Paul Williamson	Great Britain	5.40	
10	Giuseppe Gibilisco	Italy	5.40	
11	Oscar Janson	Sweden	5.40	
12	Juri Rovan	Slovenia	5.30	
13	Khalid Lachheb	France	5.20	
13	Laurens Looije	Netherlands	5.20	
13	Adam Ptáček	Czech Republic	5.20	
16	Wesley Rombaut	Belgium	5.20	
	Trond Barthel	Norway	NM	
	Montxu Miranda	Spain	NM	
	Maurilio Mariani	Italy	NM	
	Petr Špacek	Czech Republic	NM	

=== Final ===
Rank	Athlete	Nationality	5.40	5.50	5.60	5.65	5.70	5.75	5.80	5.85	Result	Notes
1st place, gold medalist(s)	Aleksandr Averbukh	Israel	–	o	–	o	–	o	–	xxx	5.75	
2nd place, silver medalist(s)	Martin Eriksson	Sweden	–	o	o	o	o	–	xxx		5.70	
3rd place, bronze medalist(s)	Rens Blom	Netherlands	o	xxo	o	x–	xx				5.60	
4	Thibaut Duval	Belgium	o	–	xo	xxx					5.60	
4	Richard Spiegelburg	Germany	o	–	xo	xxx					5.60	
6	Björn Otto	Germany	o	o	xxx						5.50	
7	Vadim Strogalev	Russia	o	xxx							5.40	
	Tim Lobinger	Germany	–	xxx							NM	
