= 2001 World Championships in Athletics – Men's pole vault =

These are the results of the Men's Pole Vault event at the 2001 World Championships in Athletics in Edmonton, Alberta, Canada.

== Medalists ==
Gold	Dmitri Markov; Australia (AUS)
Silver	Aleksandr Averbukh; Israel (ISR)
Bronze	Nick Hysong; United States (USA)

== Schedule ==
- All times are Mountain Standard Time (UTC-7)

Qualification Round
Group A	Group B
07.08.2001 – 09:00h	07.08.2001 – 10:45h
Final Round
09.08.2001 – 18:10h

== Records ==
World Record	Sergey Bubka (UKR)	6.14	Sestriere, Italy	31 July 1994
Championship Record	Maksim Tarasov (RUS)	6.02	Seville, Spain	26 August 1999

== Results ==
=== Qualification ===
7 August

==== Group A ====
Rank	Name	5.30	5.50	5.60	5.70	Result	Notes
1	Christian Tamminga (NED)	xo	o	o	o	5.70	
1	Timothy Mack (USA)	xo	o	o	o	5.70	
3	Richard Spiegelburg (GER)	xo	o	xxo	o	5.70	
3	Viktor Chistiakov (AUS)	o	xxo	xo	o	5.70	
5	Michael Stolle (GER)	xo	xo	xxo	o	5.70	
6	Romain Mesnil (FRA)	-	xxo	-	xo	5.70	
7	Martin Eriksson (SWE)	-	o	xo	xxo	5.70	
7	Aleksandr Averbukh (ISR)	-	o	xo	xxo	5.70	
7	Adam Kolasa (POL)	o	xo	o	xxo	5.70	
10	Dominic Johnson (LCA)	-	o	xo	xxx	5.60	
11	Vasiliy Gorshkov (RUS)	o	xo	xxx		5.50	
—	Manabu Yokoyama (JPN)	xxx				NM	

==== Group B ====
Rank	Name	5.30	5.50	5.60	5.70	Result	Notes
1	Dmitri Markov (AUS)	-	-	o	o	5.70	
2	Nick Hysong (USA)	-	xo	o	o	5.70	
3	Danny Ecker (GER)	-	xo	xo	o	5.70	
4	Rens Blom (NED)	o	xo	xo	xxo	5.70	
5	Patrik Kristiansson (SWE)	o	o	o	xxx	5.60	
6	Piotr Buciarski (DEN)	o	o	xo	xxx	5.60	
7	Montxu Miranda (ESP)	xxo	xo	xo	xxx	5.60	
8	Russ Buller (USA)	-	o	xxo	xxx	5.60	
9	Štěpán Janáček (CZE)	o	o	xxx		5.50	
10	Vesa Rantanen (FIN)	xxo	o	xxx		5.50	
11	Nick Buckfield (GBR)	xo	xxx			5.30	
11	Rob Pike (CAN)	xo	xxx			5.30	
—	Giuseppe Gibilisco (ITA)	xxx				NM	

=== Final ===
9 August

Rank	Name	5.50	5.65	5.75	5.85	5.90	5.95	6.05	6.10	Result	Notes
Gold medal	Dmitri Markov (AUS)	-	-	xxo	-	o	o	xo	xxx	6.05	CR
Silver medal	Aleksandr Averbukh (ISR)	-	xo	o	o	x-	xx			5.85	
Bronze medal	Nick Hysong (USA)	-	o	o	xo	xxx				5.85	SB
4	Michael Stolle (GER)	xxo	o	o	xo	xxx				5.85	SB
5	Romain Mesnil (FRA)	-	xxo	o	xxo	xxx				5.85	
6	Christian Tamminga (NED)	o	o	o	xxx					5.75	SB
6	Richard Spiegelburg (GER)	o	o	o	xxx					5.75	
8	Adam Kolasa (POL)	xo	o	o	xxx					5.75	PB
9	Timothy Mack (USA)	o	xxo	o	xxx					5.75	
10	Viktor Chistiakov (AUS)	xxo	xo	xo	xxx					5.75	
11	Danny Ecker (GER)	-	o	-	xxx					5.65	
12	Martin Eriksson (SWE)	xo	xxx							5.50	
—	Rens Blom (NED)	xxx								NM	
