= 1999 European Athletics U23 Championships – Men's pole vault =

The men's pole vault event at the 1999 European Athletics U23 Championships was held in Gothenburg, Sweden, at Ullevi on 30 July and 1 August 1999.

== Medalists ==
Gold	Romain Mesnil; France
Silver	Lars Börgeling; Germany
Bronze	Vasiliy Gorshkov; Russia

== Results ==
=== Final ===
1 August

Rank	Name	Nationality	Attempts													Result	Notes
Rank	Name	Nationality	5.30	5.40	5.50	5.55	5.60	5.65	5.70	5.75	5.80	5.85	5.90	5.93	6.01	Result	Notes
1st place, gold medalist(s)	Romain Mesnil	France	–	–	o	–	–	xo	xo	o	–	–	x–	xo	xxx	5.93	CR
2nd place, silver medalist(s)	Lars Börgeling	Germany	–	o	–	–	o	–	xo	–	o	x–	xx			5.80	
3rd place, bronze medalist(s)	Vasiliy Gorshkov	Russia	o	–	o	–	o	–	xx–	x						5.60	
4	Richard Spiegelburg	Germany	o	–	–	–	xxo	–	xxx							5.60	^{†}
5	Danny Ecker	Germany	–	–	xxo	–	–	–	xxx							5.50	
5	Nicolas Jolivet	France	o	o	xxo	x–	xx									5.50	
5	Rens Blom	Netherlands	o	–	xxo	–	xxx									5.50	
8	Štěpán Janáček	Czech Republic	o	xo	xxo	–	xxx									5.50	
9	Giuseppe Gibilisco	Italy	o	–	xxx											5.30	
10	Thibaut Duval	Belgium	xxo	–	xxx											5.30	
	Pierre-Charles Peuf	France	xxx													NM	
	Pavel Gerasimov	Russia	xxx													NM	

^{†}: Series not exactly known.

=== Qualifications ===
30 July
First 12 best to the Final

Rank	Name	Nationality	Result	Notes
1	Danny Ecker	Germany	5.35	Q
1	Richard Spiegelburg	Germany	5.35	Q
1	Thibaut Duval	Belgium	5.35	Q
1	Rens Blom	Netherlands	5.35	Q
1	Vasiliy Gorshkov	Russia	5.35	Q
6	Lars Börgeling	Germany	5.35	Q
6	Romain Mesnil	France	5.35	Q
6	Štěpán Janáček	Czech Republic	5.35	Q
6	Giuseppe Gibilisco	Italy	5.35	Q
10	Nicolas Jolivet	France	5.35	Q
11	Pierre-Charles Peuf	France	5.20	Q
11	Pavel Gerasimov	Russia	5.20	Q
13	Denis Yurchenko	Ukraine	5.20	
	Patrik Kristiansson	Sweden	NM	
	Stefan Reinstadler	Italy	NM	

== Participation ==
According to an unofficial count, 15 athletes from 9 countries participated in the event.

- Belgium (1)
- Czech Republic (1)
- France (3)
- Germany (3)
- Italy (2)
- Netherlands (1)
- Russia (2)
- Sweden (1)
- Ukraine (1)
