= 2003 World Championships in Athletics – Men's pole vault =

These are the results of the Men's Pole Vault event at the 2003 World Championships in Athletics in Paris, France.

== Medalists ==
Gold	Giuseppe Gibilisco; Italy (ITA)
Silver	Okkert Brits; South Africa (RSA)
Bronze	Patrik Kristiansson; Sweden (SWE)

== Schedule ==
- All times are Central European Time (UTC+1)

Qualification Round
Group A	Group B
26.08.2003 – 18:45h	26.08.2003 – 18:45h
Final Round
28.08.2003 – 18:30h

== Abbreviations ==
- All results shown are in metres

Q	automatic qualification
q	qualification by rank
DNS	did not start
NM	no mark
WR	world record
AR	area record
NR	national record
PB	personal best
SB	season best

== Records ==
World Record	Sergey Bubka (UKR)	6.14	Sestriere, Italy	31 July 1994
Championship Record	Dmitri Markov (AUS)	6.05	Edmonton, Canada	9 August 2001

== Results ==
=== Qualification ===
Qualification: Qualifying Performance 5.75 (Q) or at least 12 best performers (q) advance to the final.

Rank	Group	Name	Nationality	5.20	5.35	5.50	5.60	5.70	Result	Notes
1	B	Giuseppe Gibilisco	Italy	-	-	o	-	o	5.70	q
2	B	Tim Lobinger	Germany	-	-	o	xo	o	5.70	q
2	B	Viktor Chistiakov	Australia	-	-	xo	o	o	5.70	q
4	A	Dmitri Markov	Australia	-	-	-	xxo	o	5.70	q
4	A	Derek Miles	United States	-	-	xo	xo	o	5.70	q
6	B	Okkert Brits	South Africa	-	-	o	o	xo	5.70	q
6	B	Patrik Kristiansson	Sweden	-	-	-	o	xo	5.70	q
8	A	Timothy Mack	United States	-	xo	xo	o	xxo	5.70	q
8	A	Denys Yurchenko	Ukraine	-	-	xxo	-	xxo	5.70	q, SB
10	A	Adam Kolasa	Poland	-	o	o	o	xxx	5.60	q
10	B	Daichi Sawano	Japan	-	o	o	o	xxx	5.60	q
10	B	Vadim Strogalev	Russia	-	o	-	o	xxx	5.60	q
13	A	Lars Börgeling	Germany	-	-	-	xo	xxx	5.60	
14	A	Rens Blom	Netherlands	-	-	xxo	xo	xxx	5.60	
15	B	Spas Bukhalov	Bulgaria	-	o	o	xxo	xxx	5.60	
16	A	Iliyan Efremov	Bulgaria	-	xo	o	xxo	xxx	5.60	
17	A	Pavel Gerasimov	Russia	-	o	xxo	xxo	xxx	5.60	SB
18	B	Jeff Hartwig	United States	-	-	o	xxx		5.50	
19	A	Adam Ptácek	Czech Republic	-	o	xo	xxx		5.50	
20	B	Matti Mononen	Finland	-	xxo	xo	xxx		5.50	
21	A	Nick Buckfield	Great Britain	-	-	xxo	xxx		5.50	
22	A	Thibaut Duval	Belgium	-	o	xxx			5.35	
23	B	Christian Tamminga	Netherlands	-	xo	xxx			5.35	
23	B	Piotr Buciarski	Denmark	-	xo	-	xxx		5.35	
25	B	Dominic Johnson	Saint Lucia	-	xxo	xxx			5.35	
26	A	Pierre-Charles Peuf	France	o	-	xxx			5.20	
26	A	Alexandre Barbaud	France	o	-	xx-	x		5.20	
26	B	Štěpán Janáček	Czech Republic	o	xxx				5.20	
29	A	Fumiaki Kobayashi	Japan	xo	xxx				5.20	
	A	Aleksandr Averbukh	Israel	-	-	-	xxx		NM	
	B	Richard Spiegelburg	Germany	-	xxx				NM	
	B	Romain Mesnil	France	-	-	-	-	xxx	NM	

=== Final ===
28 August

Rank	Name	5.30	5.50	5.60	5.70	5.75	5.80	5.85	5.90	5.95	Result	Notes
Gold medal	Giuseppe Gibilisco (ITA)	-	-	o	-	xx-	o	o	o	-	5.90	NR
Silver medal	Okkert Brits (RSA)	-	-	xo	-	xo	-	xo	x-	xx	5.85	SB
Bronze medal	Patrik Kristiansson (SWE)	-	-	xo	-	o	o	xxo	xxx		5.85	PB
4	Dmitri Markov (AUS)	-	-	xo	-	xo	-	xxo	xx-	x	5.85	
5	Tim Lobinger (GER)	-	-	o	o	xo	o	xxx			5.80	
6	Timothy Mack (USA)	-	xo	o	o	xxx					5.70	
6	Derek Miles (USA)	-	xo	o	o	xxx					5.70	
8	Denys Yurchenko (UKR)	-	xo	-	o	-	xx-	x			5.70	SB
9	Adam Kolasa (POL)	o	o	o	xo	xxx					5.70	SB
9	Vadim Strogalev (RUS)	-	o	o	xo	-	xxx				5.70	
11	Viktor Chistiakov (AUS)	-	-	o	-	xxx					5.60	
—	Daichi Sawano (JPN)										DNS	

== See also ==
- Athletics at the 2003 Pan American Games - Men's pole vault
