= 2003 IAAF World Indoor Championships – Men's pole vault =

The men's pole vault event at the 2003 IAAF World Indoor Championships was held on March 14–15, 2003.

== Medalists ==
Gold	Silver	Bronze
Tim Lobinger; Germany	Michael Stolle; Germany	Rens Blom; Netherlands

== Results ==
=== Qualification ===
To qualify for the final, vaulters had to clear at least 5.65 m or be among the eight best performers.

Rank	Group	Athlete	Nationality	5.40	5.55	5.60	5.65	Result	Notes
1	B	Romain Mesnil	France	o	–	–	o	5.65	Q
1	B	Tim Lobinger	Germany	–	o	–	o	5.65	Q
1	B	Vasiliy Gorshkov	Russia	o	o	–	o	5.65	Q
1	B	Rens Blom	Netherlands	o	–	o	o	5.65	Q
5	B	Derek Miles	United States	–	xo	–	xo	5.65	Q
5	B	Giuseppe Gibilisco	Italy	o	–	xo	xo	5.65	Q
7	B	Michael Stolle	Germany	o	–	o	xxo	5.65	Q
8	A	Viktor Chistiakov	Australia	o	–	o	xxx	5.60	q, =AR
9	A	Patrik Kristiansson	Sweden	–	–	xo	xxx	5.60	
10	B	Adam Ptácek	Czech Republic	o	o	–	xxx	5.55	
11	B	Štěpán Janáček	Czech Republic	o	xo	–	xxx	5.55	
11	B	Jeremy Scott	United States	o	xo	–	xxx	5.55	
13	B	Piotr Buciarski	Denmark	o	xxx			5.40	
14	A	Aleksandr Averbukh	Israel	xo	–	xxx		5.40	
	A	Paul Burgess	Australia	xxx				NM	
	A	Okkert Brits	South Africa	–	xxx			NM	
	A	Oscar Janson	Sweden	xxx				NM	
	A	Dmitriy Kuptsov	Russia	xxx				NM	

=== Final ===
Rank	Athlete	Nationality	5.40	5.60	5.70	5.75	5.80	5.85	Result	Notes
1st place, gold medalist(s)	Tim Lobinger	Germany	–	o	–	o	o	xxx	5.80	
2nd place, silver medalist(s)	Michael Stolle	Germany	o	o	xo	o	x–	x	5.75	SB
3rd place, bronze medalist(s)	Rens Blom	Netherlands	o	xo	x–	xo	xx		5.75	NR
4	Vasiliy Gorshkov	Russia	o	xo	o	xx–	x		5.70	
5	Derek Miles	United States	o	xxo	o	xxx			5.70	
6	Viktor Chistiakov	Australia	o	o	xxx				5.60	=AR
7	Romain Mesnil	France	–	xo	–	xx–	x		5.60	
8	Giuseppe Gibilisco	Italy	o	xx–	x				5.40	
