= 1998 World Junior Championships in Athletics – Men's pole vault =

The men's pole vault event at the 1998 World Junior Championships in Athletics was held in Annecy, France, at Parc des Sports on 2 August.

== Medalists ==
Gold	Pavel Gerasimov; Russia
Silver	Lars Börgeling; Germany
Bronze	Paul Burgess; Australia
Bronze	Adam Ptáček; Czech Republic
Bronze	Giuseppe Gibilisco; Italy

== Results ==
=== Final ===
2 August

Rank	Name	Nationality	Result	Notes
1st place, gold medalist(s)	Pavel Gerasimov	Russia	5.55	
2nd place, silver medalist(s)	Lars Börgeling	Germany	5.50	
3rd place, bronze medalist(s)	Paul Burgess	Australia	5.20	
3rd place, bronze medalist(s)	Adam Ptáček	Czech Republic	5.20	
3rd place, bronze medalist(s)	Giuseppe Gibilisco	Italy	5.20	
6	Jacob Pauli	United States	5.10	
7	Jukka Nurmela	Finland	5.10	
8	Thibaut Duval	Belgium	5.00	
8	Gildas Verbist	France	5.00	
8	Georgi Wassilew	Germany	5.00	
11	Yevgeniy Mikhaylichenko	Russia	5.00	
12	Christian Linskey	United Kingdom	5.00	
13	Arnaud Verguet	France	4.80	
13	Brian Hunter	United States	4.80	
	Xu Gang	China	NH	
	Kim Do-Kyun	South Korea	NH	

== Participation ==
According to an unofficial count, 16 athletes from 12 countries participated in the event.

- Australia (1)
- Belgium (1)
- China (1)
- Czech Republic (1)
- Finland (1)
- France (2)
- Germany (2)
- Italy (1)
- Russia (2)
- South Korea (1)
- United Kingdom (1)
- United States (2)
