= 2004 IAAF World Indoor Championships – Men's pole vault =

The Men's pole vault event at the 2004 IAAF World Indoor Championships was held on March 6–7.

== Medalists ==
Gold	Silver	Bronze
Igor Pavlov; Russia	Adam Ptácek; Czech Republic	Denys Yurchenko; Ukraine

== Results ==
=== Qualification ===
Qualification: Qualification Performance 5.75 (Q) or at least 8 best performers advanced to the final.

Rank	Group	Athlete	Nationality	5.30	5.45	5.55	5.65	5.70	5.75	Result	Notes
1	A	Igor Pavlov	Russia	–	o	o	xo	xo	o	5.75	Q
2	A	Adam Ptácek	Czech Republic	xo	o	o	o	o	xxx	5.70	q, SB
2	B	Rens Blom	Netherlands	–	–	o	xo	o	–	5.70	q
4	B	Giuseppe Gibilisco	Italy	–	–	xxo	–	o	–	5.70	q
5	A	Tim Lobinger	Germany	–	–	o	–	xo	xxx	5.70	q
6	A	Denys Yurchenko	Ukraine	–	–	xo	–	xo	xxx	5.70	q
6	B	Patrik Kristiansson	Sweden	–	–	xo	o	xo	xxx	5.70	q
6	B	Romain Mesnil	France	–	o	–	x–	xo	xxx	5.70	q
9	B	Okkert Brits	South Africa	–	–	xo	–	xxo	xxx	5.70	
10	B	Oleksandr Korchmid	Ukraine	–	xo	xo	o	xxx		5.65	SB
11	A	Dmitri Markov	Australia	–	o	–	xo	xxx		5.65	AR
11	B	Björn Otto	Germany	–	o	o	xo	xxx		5.65	
13	A	Oscar Janson	Sweden	–	o	–	xxo	xxx		5.65	SB
14	A	Daichi Sawano	Japan	o	o	o	xxx			5.55	
14	A	Aleksandr Averbukh	Israel	–	o	o	xxx			5.55	
14	B	Toby Stevenson	United States	–	–	o	xxx			5.55	
17	A	Jeff Hartwig	United States	–	–	xxo	xxx			5.55	
18	A	Iliyan Efremov	Bulgaria	o	o	–	xxx			5.45	
18	A	Jérôme Clavier	France	o	o	xxx				5.45	
18	B	Pavel Gerasimov	Russia	–	o	xxx				5.45	
18	B	Piotr Buciarski	Denmark	–	o	xxx				5.45	
22	B	Paul Burgess	Australia	xo	o	xxx				5.45	
23	B	Matti Mononen	Finland	xo	xxx					5.30	
	A	Kim Yoo-Suk	South Korea	xxx						NM	

=== Final ===
Rank	Athlete	Nationality	5.40	5.50	5.60	5.70	5.80	5.85	Result	Notes
1st place, gold medalist(s)	Igor Pavlov	Russia	–	xo	o	o	o	xxx	5.80	PB
2nd place, silver medalist(s)	Adam Ptácek	Czech Republic	o	–	o	o	xxx		5.70	SB
3rd place, bronze medalist(s)	Denys Yurchenko	Ukraine	–	–	xo	o	xx–	x	5.70	
4	Patrik Kristiansson	Sweden	–	–	o	xo	xxx		5.70	
5	Tim Lobinger	Germany	–	–	xo	xo	xxx		5.70	
6	Giuseppe Gibilisco	Italy	–	–	o	–	xx–	x	5.60	
7	Romain Mesnil	France	–	x–	xo	x–	xx		5.60	
	Rens Blom	Netherlands	–	–	xxx				NM	
