= 1997 European Athletics U23 Championships – Men's pole vault =

The men's pole vault event at the 1997 European Athletics U23 Championships was held in Turku, Finland, on 10 and 12 July 1997.

== Medalists ==
Gold	Yevgeniy Smiryagin; Russia
Silver	Montxu Miranda; Spain
Bronze	Petr Špaček; Czech Republic

== Results ==
=== Final ===
12 July

Rank	Name	Nationality	Attempts						Result	Notes
Rank	Name	Nationality	5.20	5.40	5.50	5.60	5.70	5.87	Result	Notes
1st place, gold medalist(s)	Yevgeniy Smiryagin	Russia	–	xo	–	xo	xo	xxx	5.70	
2nd place, silver medalist(s)	Montxu Miranda	Spain	o	xo	o	xxx			5.50	
3rd place, bronze medalist(s)	Petr Špaček	Czech Republic	xo	xxo	xo	xxx			5.50	
4	Vesa Rantanen	Finland	o	xo	xxo	xxx			5.50	
5	Khalid Lachheb	France	xxo	xo	xxo	xxx			5.50	
6	Andrea Giannini	Italy	o	xo	xxx				5.40	
7	Pavel Burlachenko	Russia	xxo	xo	xxx				5.40	
8	Michel Gigandet	Switzerland	o	xxx					5.20	
8	Piotr Buciarski	Denmark	o	xxx					5.20	
10	Rens Blom	Netherlands	xo	xxx					5.20	
11	Jure Rovan	Slovenia	xxo	xxx					5.20	
	Jussi Autio	Finland	xxx						NM	

=== Qualifications ===
10 July
Qualify: first to 12 to the Final

Rank	Name	Nationality	Result	Notes
1	Pavel Burlachenko	Russia	5.40	Q
1	Rens Blom	Netherlands	5.40	Q
1	Yevgeniy Smiryagin	Russia	5.40	Q
4	Jure Rovan	Slovenia	5.40	Q
5	Andrea Giannini	Italy	5.40	Q
6	Petr Špaček	Czech Republic	5.40	Q
7	Montxu Miranda	Spain	5.40	Q
8	Khalid Lachheb	France	5.40	Q
9	Michel Gigandet	Switzerland	5.40	Q
10	Piotr Buciarski	Denmark	5.30	Q
10	Vesa Rantanen	Finland	5.30	Q
10	Jussi Autio	Finland	5.30	Q
13	Ketil Rønneberg	Norway	5.30	
14	Hendik Hübner	Germany	5.30	
15	Patrik Kristiansson	Sweden	5.20	
16	Fabio Pizzolato	Italy	5.20	
17	Danny Ecker	Germany	5.20	
18	Taoufik Lachheb	France	5.00	
	Christos Adamides	Cyprus	NM	
	Khristo Kuzov	Bulgaria	NM	

== Participation ==
According to an unofficial count, 20 athletes from 15 countries participated in the event.

- Bulgaria (1)
- Cyprus (1)
- Czech Republic (1)
- Denmark (1)
- Finland (2)
- France (2)
- Germany (2)
- Italy (2)
- Netherlands (1)
- Norway (1)
- Russia (2)
- Slovenia (1)
- Spain (1)
- Sweden (1)
- Switzerland (1)
