= Lars Börgeling =

German pole vaulter

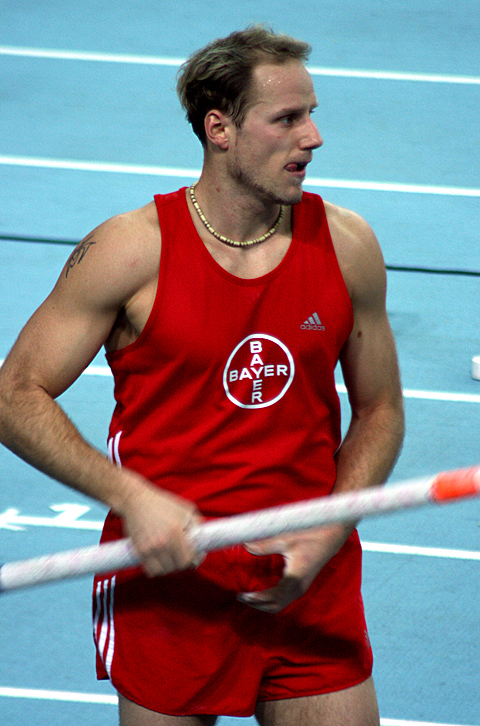
- Lars Börgeling 2007

Medal record

Men's athletics

Representing Germany

European Championships
Silver medal – second place	2002 Munich	Pole vault

Lars Börgeling (born 16 April 1979, in Neuss) is a German pole vaulter.

His personal best is 5.85 metres, achieved in July 2002 in Leverkusen. This ranks him ninth among German pole vaulters, behind Tim Lobinger, Andrei Tivontchik, Michael Stolle, Danny Ecker, Richard Spiegelburg, Malte Mohr, Björn Otto and Raphael Holzdeppe.

== Achievements ==
Year	Competition	Venue	Position	Notes
Representing Germany
1996	World Junior Championships	Sydney, Australia	8th	5.00 m
1997	European Junior Championships	Ljubljana, Slovenia	1st	5.40 m
1998	World Junior Championships	Annecy, France	2nd	5.50 m
1999	European U23 Championships	Gothenburg, Sweden	2nd	5.80 m
2001	European U23 Championships	Amsterdam, Netherlands	1st	5.60 m
2002	European Indoor Championships	Vienna, Austria	3rd	5.75 m
2002	European Championships	Munich, Germany	2nd	5.80 m
2002	World Cup	Madrid, Spain	3rd	5.40 m
2003	World Championships	Paris, France	13th (q)	5.60 m
2004	Olympic Games	Athens, Greece	6th	5.75 m
2005	World Championships	Helsinki, Finland	—	NM
2006	European Championships	Gothenburg, Sweden	—	NM
2006	World Athletics Final	Stuttgart, Germany	8th	5.50 m

== See also ==
- Germany all-time top lists - Pole vault
