= Athletics at the 2004 Summer Olympics – Men's pole vault =

Men's pole vault at the Games of the XXVIII Olympiad
- Athletics pictogram
- Venue: Olympic Stadium
- Dates: 25–27 August
- Competitors: 39 from 25 nations
- Winning height: 5.95 OR

Medalists
1st place, gold medalist(s)		Timothy Mack; United States
2nd place, silver medalist(s)		Toby Stevenson; United States
3rd place, bronze medalist(s)		Giuseppe Gibilisco; Italy

The men's pole vault competition at the 2004 Summer Olympics in Athens was held at the Olympic Stadium on 25–27 August. Thirty-nine athletes from 25 nations competed. The event was won by Timothy Mack of the United States, the nation's 18th victory in the men's pole vault. Toby Stevenson took silver, making it the second consecutive Games that Americans finished 1st and 2nd. Giuseppe Gibilisco's bronze was Italy's first medal in the event.

== Summary ==
With a first attempt clearance at 5.85m, Giuseppe Gibilisco went into 5.90m with the lead. Tim Mack and Toby Stevenson were the only others to clear 5.85m, both on their second attempt, but Stevenson had the advantage because Mack had an earlier miss. But the medals were not settled because Igor Pavlov saved one attempt for 5.90m. Stevenson and Mack both made it on their first attempt, while Pavlov missed to be eliminated and Gibilisco missed his first. With nothing to be gained, Gibilisco passed to 5.95 m (19 ft 6 1/4 in). The only way to unseat Stevenson was a clearance, but nobody could negotiate 5.95 in their first two attempts, leaving Gibilisco with bronze. On his final attempt, Mack slithered over a personal best for the second time in the competition. It was also a new Olympic record. Stevenson put on his helmet to take one last attempt but the bar dragged off, giving Mack the gold.

== Background ==
This was the 25th appearance of the event, which is one of 12 athletics events to have been held at every Summer Olympics. The returning finalists from the 2000 Games were fifth-place finisher (and 1996 finalist) Dmitriy Markov of Australia, seventh-place finisher Okkert Brits of South Africa, eighth-place finisher Danny Ecker of Germany, tenth-place finishers Giuseppe Gibilisco of Italy and Aleksandr Averbukh of Israel, and thirteenth-place finisher Tim Lobinger of Germany. Markov had won the 2001 world championship, with Gibilisco winning in 2003. For the first time in decades, Sergey Bubka was not favored—if only because he had retired in 2001.

Slovenia made its men's pole vaulting debut; Uzbekistan entered a vaulter, but he did not start. The United States made its 24th appearance, most of any nation, having missed only the boycotted 1980 Games.

== Qualification ==
The qualification period for Athletics was 1 January 2003 to 9 August 2004. For the men's pole vault, each National Olympic Committee was permitted to enter up to three athletes that had vaulted 5.65 metres or higher during the qualification period. The maximum number of athletes per nation had been set at 3 since the 1930 Olympic Congress. If an NOC had no athletes that qualified under that standard, one athlete that had vaulted 5.55 metres or higher could be entered.

== Competition format ==
The competition consisted of two rounds, qualification and final. Athletes start with a qualifying round. Jumping in turn, each athlete attempts to achieve the qualifying height. If they fail at three jumps in a row, they are eliminated. After a successful jump, they receive three more attempts to achieve the next height. Once all jumps have been completed, all athletes who have achieved the qualifying height go through to the final. If fewer than 12 athletes achieve the qualifying standard, the best 12 athletes go through. Cleared heights reset for the final, which followed the same format until all athletes fail three consecutive jumps.

== Records ==
Prior to the competition, the existing world and Olympic records were as follows:

World record	Sergey Bubka (UKR)	6.14 m	Sestrière, Italy	31 July 1994
Olympic record	Jean Galfione (FRA)	5.92 m	Atlanta, United States	2 August 1996

Timothy Mack was the only man to clear 5.95 metres in Athens, winning the gold medal and setting a new Olympic record.

== Schedule ==
All times are Greece Standard Time (UTC+2)

Date	Time	Round
Wednesday, 25 August 2004	19:15	Qualifying
Friday, 27 August 2004	20:00	Final

== Results ==
Key

- o = Height cleared
- x = Height failed
- – = Height passed
- r = Retired
- SB = Season's best
- PB = Personal best
- NR = National record
- AR = Area record
- OR = Olympic record
- WR = World record
- WL = World lead
- NM = No mark
- DNS = Did not start
- DQ = Disqualified

=== Qualifying round ===
Rule: Qualifying standard 5.70 (Q) or at least best 12 qualified (q).

Rank	Group	Athlete	Nation	5.30	5.50	5.60	5.65	5.70	Height	Notes
1	B	Aleksandr Averbukh	Israel	—	o	—	o	o	5.70	Q
1	A	Lars Börgeling	Germany	—	o	—	o	o	5.70	Q, =SB
1	B	Paul Burgess	Australia	—	o	—	o	o	5.70	Q
1	A	Pavel Gerasimov	Russia	—	o	o	—	o	5.70	Q
1	A	Ruslan Yeremenko	Ukraine	—	o	—	o	o	5.70	Q, =SB
6	B	Igor Pavlov	Russia	—	o	xo	—	o	5.70	Q
7	A	Toby Stevenson	United States	—	xo	xo	—	o	5.70	Q
7	B	Danny Ecker	Germany	—	xxo	—	—	o	5.70	Q
7	A	Rens Blom	Netherlands	—	xo	xo	—	o	5.70	Q
10	B	Denys Yurchenko	Ukraine	—	xo	—	xxo	o	5.70	Q
11	B	Timothy Mack	United States	—	o	o	—	xo	5.70	Q
12	A	Giuseppe Gibilisco	Italy	—	o	—	x-	xo	5.70	Q
12	B	Tim Lobinger	Germany	—	o	xo	—	xo	5.70	Q
14	B	Oleksandr Korchmid	Ukraine	—	xo	o	xxo	xo	5.70	Q, =SB
15	A	Daichi Sawano	Japan	o	xo	xo	xxo	xo	5.70	Q
16	A	Derek Miles	United States	—	o	o	—	xxo	5.70	Q
17	B	Matti Mononen	Finland	o	o	—	o	xxx	5.65	PB
18	A	Romain Mesnil	France	—	o	—	xxo	xxx	5.65	
19	A	Okkert Brits	South Africa	xo	—	o	—	xxx	5.60	
20	B	Patrik Kristiansson	Sweden	—	—	xo	—	xxx	5.60	
21	B	Nick Buckfield	Great Britain	xo	o	xxo	—	xxx	5.60	
22	B	Dmitri Markov	Australia	—	o	—	xxx	—N/a	5.50	
22	A	Vesa Rantanen	Finland	o	o	xx-	x	—N/a	5.50	
22	A	Adam Ptáček	Czech Republic	o	o	x-	x	—N/a	5.50	
25	A	Jurij Rovan	Slovenia	xxo	xo	xxx	—N/a		5.50	
26	B	Piotr Buciarski	Denmark	o	xxo	xxx	—N/a		5.50	
27	A	Spas Bukhalov	Bulgaria	xo	xxo	xxx	—N/a		5.50	
28	A	Steven Hooker	Australia	o	xxx	—N/a			5.30	
28	B	Štěpán Janáček	Czech Republic	o	xx-	x	—N/a		5.30	
28	B	Javier Gazol	Spain	o	xxx	—N/a			5.30	
31	B	Nicolas Guigon	France	xo	xxx	—N/a			5.30	
31	B	Adam Kolasa	Poland	xo	xxx	—N/a			5.30	
33	A	Kim Yoo-suk	South Korea	xxo	xxx	—N/a			5.30	
33	A	Marios Evangelou	Greece	xxo	xxx	—N/a			5.30	
—	A	Vadim Strogalev	Russia	—	xxx	—N/a			No mark	
—	A	Liu Feiliang	China	xxx	—N/a				No mark	
—	B	Iliyan Efremov	Bulgaria	xxx	—N/a				No mark	
—	B	Giovanni Lanaro	Mexico	x	—N/a				No mark	
—	A	Grigoriy Yegorov	Kazakhstan	xxx	—N/a				No mark	
—	B	Leonid Andreev	Uzbekistan	—N/a					DNS	

=== Final ===
Rank	Athlete	Nation	5.40	5.55	5.65	5.75	5.80	5.85	5.90	5.95	6.00	Height	Notes
1st place, gold medalist(s)	Timothy Mack	United States	—	o	xo	o	—	xo	o	xxo	xxx	5.95	OR
2nd place, silver medalist(s)	Toby Stevenson	United States	—	o	o	o	—	xo	o	xxx	—N/a	5.90	
3rd place, bronze medalist(s)	Giuseppe Gibilisco	Italy	—	xo	—	o	—	o	x-	xx	—N/a	5.85	SB
4	Igor Pavlov	Russia	—	o	o	xo	xo	xx-	x	—N/a		5.80	PB
5	Danny Ecker	Germany	—	xxo	—	o	xxx	—N/a				5.75	SB
6	Lars Börgeling	Germany	—	o	—	xxo	xx-	x	—N/a			5.75	SB
7	Derek Miles	United States	—	o	xo	xxo	x-	xx	—N/a			5.75	
8	Aleksandr Averbukh	Israel	—	—	o	xxx	—N/a					5.65	SB
9	Denys Yurchenko	Ukraine	—	xo	o	xxx	—N/a					5.65	
9	Rens Blom	Netherlands	—	xo	o	xxx	—N/a					5.65	
11	Paul Burgess	Australia	—	o	—	xxx	—N/a					5.55	
11	Tim Lobinger	Germany	—	o	xxx	—N/a						5.55	
13	Pavel Gerasimov	Russia	—	xo	x-	x	—N/a					5.55	
13	Daichi Sawano	Japan	o	xo	xxx	—N/a						5.55	
13	Ruslan Yeremenko	Ukraine	—	xxo	—	xxx	—N/a					5.55	
16	Oleksandr Korchmid	Ukraine	—	xxo	xxx	—N/a						5.55	
