= 1996 World Junior Championships in Athletics – Men's pole vault =

The men's pole vault event at the 1996 World Junior Championships in Athletics was held in Sydney, Australia, at International Athletic Centre on 23 and 25 August, 1996.

== Medalists ==
| Gold | Paul Burgess; Australia |
| Silver | Patrik Kristiansson; Sweden |
| Bronze | Danny Ecker; Germany |

== Results ==
=== Final ===
25 August

| Rank | Name | Nationality | Result | Notes |
|---|---|---|---|---|
| 1st place, gold medalist(s) | Paul Burgess | Australia | 5.35 | |
| 2nd place, silver medalist(s) | Patrik Kristiansson | Sweden | 5.30 | |
| 3rd place, bronze medalist(s) | Danny Ecker | Germany | 5.30 | |
| 4 | Xu Gang | China | 5.25 | |
| 5 | Timo Makkonen | Finland | 5.10 | |
| 6 | Ferenc László | Hungary | 5.10 | |
| 7 | Viktor von Bothmer | Sweden | 5.10 | |
| 8 | Jonne Willman | Finland | 5.00 | |
| 8 | Lars Börgeling | Germany | 5.00 | |
| 8 | Sergey Porokhin | Russia | 5.00 | |
| 11 | Christian Linskey | United Kingdom | 5.00 | |
| | Roman Morozov | Russia | NH | |

=== Qualifications ===
23 Aug

==== Group A ====
| Rank | Name | Nationality | Result | Notes |
|---|---|---|---|---|
| 1 | Jonne Willman | Finland | 5.15 | Q |
| 2 | Patrik Kristiansson | Sweden | 5.15 | Q |
| 3 | Danny Ecker | Germany | 5.15 | Q |
| 3 | Sergey Porokhin | Russia | 5.15 | Q |
| 5 | Christian Linskey | United Kingdom | 5.15 | Q |
| 6 | Štěpán Janáček | Czech Republic | 5.00 | |
| 7 | Rafik Mefti | Algeria | 5.00 | |
| 8 | Matt Filsell | Australia | 4.90 | |
| 9 | Gabriel Martínez | Spain | 4.90 | |
| 10 | Satoru Suzuki | Japan | 4.90 | |
| 11 | Jan Žalud | Czech Republic | 4.80 | |
| | Nicolas Jolivet | France | NH | |
| | Shane Stewart | United States | NH | |

==== Group B ====
| Rank | Name | Nationality | Result | Notes |
|---|---|---|---|---|
| 1 | Timo Makkonen | Finland | 5.15 | Q |
| 1 | Roman Morozov | Russia | 5.15 | Q |
| 3 | Paul Burgess | Australia | 5.15 | Q |
| 3 | Ferenc László | Hungary | 5.15 | Q |
| 5 | Lars Börgeling | Germany | 5.15 | Q |
| 6 | Viktor von Bothmer | Sweden | 5.15 | Q |
| 7 | Xu Gang | China | 5.15 | Q |
| 8 | Romain Mesnil | France | 5.10 | |
| 9 | Kazuma Ogura | Japan | 5.10 | |
| 10 | Kostas Kouklis | Greece | 4.80 | |
| 11 | Mark Davis | United Kingdom | 4.60 | |
| | Jim Davis | United States | NH | |

== Participation ==
According to an unofficial count, 25 athletes from 15 countries participated in the event.

- Algeria (1)
- Australia (2)
- China (1)
- Czech Republic (2)
- Finland (2)
- France (2)
- Germany (2)
- Greece (1)
- Hungary (1)
- Japan (2)
- Russia (2)
- Spain (1)
- Sweden (2)
- United Kingdom (2)
- United States (2)
