= 1998 European Athletics Championships – Men's pole vault =

Men's pole vault at the European Athletics Championships

The men's pole vault at the 1998 European Athletics Championships was held at the Népstadion on 19 and 22 August.

== Medalists ==
Gold	Maksim Tarasov; Russia
Silver	Tim Lobinger; Germany
Bronze	Jean Galfione; France

== Results ==
KEY:	q	Better non-qualifiers	Q	Qualified	NR	National record	PB	Personal best	SB	Seasonal best

=== Qualification ===
Qualification: Qualification Performance 5.70 (Q) or at least 12 best performers advance to the final.

Rank	Group	Athlete	Nationality	5.30	5.45	5.60	Result	Notes
1	A	Jean Galfione	France				5.60	q
1	A	Tim Lobinger	Germany				5.60	q
1	A	Vyacheslav Shuteyev	Ukraine				5.60	q
1	B	Maksim Tarasov	Russia				5.60	q
1	B	Danny Ecker	Germany				5.60	q
1	B	Laurens Looije	Netherlands				5.60	q
1	B	Andrei Tivontchik	Germany				5.60	q
1	B	Khalid Lachheb	France				5.60	q
9	A	Christian Tamminga	Netherlands				5.45	q
9	B	Patrik Kristiansson	Sweden				5.45	q
9	B	Heikki Vääräniemi	Finland			xxx	5.45	q
9	B	Jurij Rovan	Slovenia	o	xo	xxx	5.45	q
9	B	Pavel Burlachenko	Russia	–	xo	xxx	5.45	q
14	A	Krzysztof Kusiak	Poland				5.45	
14	A	Trond Barthel	Norway				5.45	
14	A	Patrik Stenlund	Sweden				5.45	
17	A	Vesa Rantanen	Finland				5.30	
17	A	Yevgeniy Smiryagin	Russia				5.30	
17	A	Martin Voss	Denmark				5.30	
17	A	Piotr Buciarski	Denmark				5.30	
17	B	Nick Buckfield	Great Britain				5.30	
17	B	Martin Eriksson	Sweden				5.30	
	A	Romain Mesnil	France				NM	
	A	Nuno Fernandes	Portugal				NM	
	B	Danny Krasnov	Israel				NM	

=== Final ===
Rank	Athlete	Nationality	5.40	5.50	5.60	5.70	5.76	5.81	5.86	6.01	Result	Notes
1st place, gold medalist(s)	Maksim Tarasov	Russia	–	–	–	o	–	o	–	xxx	5.81	
2nd place, silver medalist(s)	Tim Lobinger	Germany	–	o	xo	o	xx–	o	xxx		5.81	
3rd place, bronze medalist(s)	Jean Galfione	France	–	–	o	–	o	–	xxx		5.76	
4	Danny Ecker	Germany	–	xo	–	o	xo	x–	xx		5.76	
5	Khalid Lachheb	France	xxo	–	o	xxx					5.60	
6	Andrei Tivontchik	Germany	–	o	–	xxx					5.50	
7	Pavel Burlachenko	Russia	xxo	o	xxx						5.50	
8	Heikki Vääräniemi	Finland	xo	xo	xxx						5.50	
9	Jurij Rovan	Slovenia	xo	xxo							5.50	
10	Laurens Looije	Netherlands	o	–	xxx						5.40	
11	Christian Tamminga	Netherlands	xo		xxx						5.40	
	Patrik Kristiansson	Sweden	xxx								NM	
	Vyacheslav Shuteyev	Ukraine	xxx								NM	
