= 2005 World Championships in Athletics – Men's pole vault =

The Men's Pole Vault event at the 2005 World Championships in Athletics was held at the Helsinki Olympic Stadium on August 9 and August 11.

== Medalists ==
Gold	Rens Blom; Netherlands (NED)
Silver	Brad Walker; United States (USA)
Bronze	Pavel Gerasimov; Russia (RUS)

== Schedule ==
- All times are Eastern European Time (UTC+2)

Qualification Round
Group A	Group B
09.08.2005 – 12:10h	09.08.2005 – 13:40h
Final Round
11.08.2005 – 18:35h

== Records ==
World Record	Sergey Bubka (UKR)	6.14	Sestriere, Italy	31 July 1994
Championship Record	Dmitri Markov (AUS)	6.05	Edmonton, Canada	9 August 2001

== Results ==
=== Qualification ===
Qualification: Qualifying Performance 5.60 (Q) or at least 12 best performers (q) advance to the final.

Rank	Group	Name	Nationality	5.30	5.45	5.60	Result	Notes
1	A	Nick Hysong	United States	–	–	o	5.60	Q
2	A	Igor Pavlov	Russia	xo	xo	o	5.60	Q
3	A	Tim Lobinger	Germany	–	o	xo	5.60	Q
3	A	Dmitri Markov	Australia	–	–	xo	5.60	Q
3	A	Patrik Kristiansson	Sweden	–	–	xo	5.60	Q
6	B	Pavel Gerasimov	Russia	–	o	xxo	5.60	Q
7	A	Daichi Sawano	Japan	–	o	xxx	5.45	q
7	A	Kevin Rans	Belgium	o	o	xxx	5.45	q
7	B	Giuseppe Gibilisco	Italy	–	o	xxx	5.45	q
7	B	Danny Ecker	Germany	–	o	xxx	5.45	q
7	B	Rens Blom	Netherlands	–	o	xxx	5.45	q
7	B	Brad Walker	United States	–	o	xxx	5.45	q
13	A	Jean Galfione	France	xo	o	xxx	5.45	
14	B	Konstadinos Filippidis	Greece	o	xo	xxx	5.45	
14	B	Damiel Dossévi	France	–	xo	xxx	5.45	
16	B	Giovanni Lanaro	Mexico	xxo	xo	xxx	5.45	
17	B	Denys Yurchenko	Ukraine	–	xxo	xxx	5.45	
17	B	Steven Hooker	Australia	–	xxo	xxx	5.45	
19	B	Jure Rovan	Slovenia	o	xxx		5.30	
19	B	Matti Mononen	Finland	o	xxx		5.30	
21	A	Piotr Buciarski	Denmark	xo	xxx		5.30	
	A	Leonid Andreev	Uzbekistan	xxx			NM	
	A	Vladyslav Revenko	Ukraine	–	–	xxx	NM	
	A	Liu Feiliang	China	xxx			NM	
	B	Kim Yoo-suk	South Korea	xxx			NM	
	B	Lars Börgeling	Germany	–	xxx		NM	
	A	Toby Stevenson	United States				DNS	

=== Final ===
Rank	Name	Nationality	5.35	5.50	5.65	5.75	5.80	5.85	Result	Notes
1st place, gold medalist(s)	Rens Blom	Netherlands	–	xxo	xo	xo	o	x	5.80	SB
2nd place, silver medalist(s)	Brad Walker	United States	–	xxo	xo	xo	x–	xx	5.75	
3rd place, bronze medalist(s)	Pavel Gerasimov	Russia	–	o	xo	xxx			5.65	SB
4	Igor Pavlov	Russia	–	o	xxo	xxx			5.65	
5	Giuseppe Gibilisco	Italy	–	o	xxx				5.50	
5	Tim Lobinger	Germany	–	o	xxx				5.50	
5	Nick Hysong	United States	–	o	xxx				5.50	
8	Daichi Sawano	Japan	xo	o	xxx				5.50	
9	Patrik Kristiansson	Sweden	–	xxo	xxx				5.50	
10	Kevin Rans	Belgium	o	xxx					5.35	
	Dmitri Markov	Australia	–	xxx					NM	
	Danny Ecker	Germany	–	xxx					NM	
