= Veronica Eriksson =

Swedish pole vaulter (born 1971)

Personal information
- Born: 15 June 1971 (age 55) Stockholm, Sweden

Sport
- Sport: Track and field
Medal record
Representing Sweden
European Indoor Championships
Silver medal – second place	2000 Ghent	Pole vault

Veronica Eriksson (formerly Martin Eriksson; born 15 June 1971) is a Swedish former pole vaulter.

== Career ==
Born in Stockholm, Eriksson represented IF Linnéa and Hässelby SK in Sweden. Studying in the United States and competing for the Minnesota Golden Gophers track and field team from 1991 to 1994, Eriksson won the 1993 pole vault at the NCAA Division I Indoor Track and Field Championships with a mark of 5.50 metres.

In March 2000, a 5.80-metre jump in Pietersburg, South Africa, became a new Swedish record. This was also the best mark throughout the career for the pole vaulter. As of 2025, it marks fourth on the Swedish all-time list, behind Armand Duplantis, Oscar Janson and Patrik Kristiansson, and equal to Alhaji Jeng. The same year, Eriksson was chosen to represent Sweden in the 2000 Summer Olympics, finishing 22nd in the qualification round, meaning not advancing.

== Personal life ==
In February 2020, Eriksson told about her undergone hormone treatment, facial surgery, legal gender reassignment and name change to Veronica.

== Achievements ==
Year	Competition	Venue	Position	Notes
Representing Sweden
1989	European Junior Championships	Varaždin, Yugoslavia	14th	4.70 m
1990	World Junior Championships	Plovdiv, Bulgaria	8th (q)	5.10 m (Note: No mark in the final)
1996	European Indoor Championships	Stockholm, Sweden	5th	5.70 m
1997	World Indoor Championships	Paris, France	10th	5.55 m
1997	World Championships	Athens, Greece	9th	5.50 m
1998	European Indoor Championships	Valencia, Spain	23rd (q)	5.40 m
1998	European Championships	Budapest, Hungary	17th (q)	5.30 m
1999	Universiade	Palma de Mallorca, Spain	4th	5.40 m
1999	World Championships	Seville, Spain	14th (q)	5.55 m
2000	European Indoor Championships	Ghent, Belgium	2nd	5.70 m
2000	Olympic Games	Sydney	22nd (q)	5.55 m
2001	World Championships	Edmonton, Canada	12th	5.50 m
2002	European Indoor Championships	Vienna, Austria	9th (q)	5.55 m
