= Athletics at the 1999 Summer Universiade – Men's pole vault =

The men's pole vault event at the 1999 Summer Universiade was held on 9 and 10 July at the Estadio Son Moix in Palma de Mallorca, Spain.

== Medalists ==
Gold	Silver	Bronze
Richard Spiegelburg; Germany	Štěpán Janáček; Czech Republic	Romain Mesnil; France

== Results ==
=== Qualification ===
Qualification: 5.40 (Q) or at least 12 best performers (q) advance to the final

Rank	Group	Athlete	Nationality	4.80	5.00	5.20	5.30	Result	Notes
1	A	Martin Eriksson	Sweden					5.30	q
1	A	Romain Mesnil	France					5.30	q
3	A	Björn Otto	Germany					5.30	q
4	A	Piotr Buciarski	Denmark					5.20	q
5	A	Scott Slover	United States					5.20	q
6	A	David Cardone	Australia					5.00	
7	A	Gustavo Rehder	Brazil					5.00	
8	A	Kim Se-in	South Korea					4.80	
	A	Christian Tamminga	Netherlands					NM	
	A	José Manuel Arcos	Spain	–	–	xxx		NM	
1	B	Jurij Rovan	Slovenia					5.30	q
1	B	Thibault Duval	Belgium					5.30	q
3	B	Taoufik Lachheb	France					5.30	q
4	B	Richard Spiegelburg	Germany					5.30	q
5	B	Robison Pratt	Mexico					5.20	q
6	B	Oscar Janson	Sweden					5.20	q
7	B	Štěpán Janáček	Czech Republic					5.00	q
	B	Andrea Giannini	Italy					NM	
	B	Luis Vallejo	Spain	–	x–	xx		NM	

=== Final ===
Rank	Athlete	Nationality	5.20	5.30	5.40	5.50	5.55	5.60	5.65	5.70	Result	Notes
1st place, gold medalist(s)	Richard Spiegelburg	Germany	–	xo	–	o	–	xo	–	xxx	5.60	
2nd place, silver medalist(s)	Štěpán Janáček	Czech Republic	o	–	xxo	xo	–	xo	xxx		5.60	
3rd place, bronze medalist(s)	Romain Mesnil	France	–	–	xo	–	o	–	xxx		5.55	
4	Martin Eriksson	Sweden									5.40	
5	Oscar Janson	Sweden									5.40	
6	Taoufik Lachheb	France									5.40	
7	Piotr Buciarski	Denmark									5.40	
8	Björn Otto	Germany									5.40	
9	Scott Slover	United States									5.30	
10	Jurij Rovan	Slovenia									5.20	
	Thibault Duval	Belgium									NM	
	Robison Pratt	Mexico									NM	
