= 1994 World Junior Championships in Athletics – Men's pole vault =

The men's pole vault event at the 1994 World Junior Championships in Athletics was held in Lisbon, Portugal, at Estádio Universitário de Lisboa on 20 and 22 July.

== Medalists ==
Gold	Viktor Chistyakov; Russia
Silver	Dmitriy Markov; Belarus
Bronze	Taoufik Lachheb; France

== Results ==
=== Final ===
22 July

Rank	Name	Nationality	Result	Notes
1st place, gold medalist(s)	Viktor Chistyakov	Russia	5.60	
2nd place, silver medalist(s)	Dmitriy Markov	Belarus	5.50	
3rd place, bronze medalist(s)	Taoufik Lachheb	France	5.30	
4	Przemyslaw Gurin	Poland	5.30	
5	Eric Boxley	United States	5.30	
6	Tine Lorenci	Slovenia	5.20	
7	Adam Kolasa	Poland	5.10	
8	Jurij Rovan	Slovenia	5.10	
9	Scott Slover	United States	5.10	
10	Jussi Autio	Finland	5.00	
11	Yevgeniy Smiryagin	Russia	5.00	
12	Zdenek Šafár	Czech Republic	4.80	
	Vesa Rantanen	Finland	NH	

=== Qualifications ===
20 Jul

==== Group A ====
Rank	Name	Nationality	Result	Notes
1	Dmitriy Markov	Belarus	5.10	q
1	Eric Boxley	United States	5.10	q
3	Jussi Autio	Finland	5.10	q
3	Yevgeniy Smiryagin	Russia	5.10	q
5	Tine Lorenci	Slovenia	5.10	q
6	Przemyslaw Gurin	Poland	5.00	q
7	Junichi Sano	Japan	5.00	
8	Fabio Pizzolato	Italy	5.00	
9	Christophe Lemarie	France	5.00	
10	Montxu Miranda	Spain	4.80	
11	Alexandrs Danilovs	Latvia	4.60	
12	'Aisea Tukutau	Tonga	4.00	
	Matej Urban	Czech Republic	NH	

==== Group B ====
Rank	Name	Nationality	Result	Notes
1	Viktor Chistyakov	Russia	5.10	q
2	Taoufik Lachheb	France	5.10	q
3	Zdenek Šafár	Czech Republic	5.10	q
3	Adam Kolasa	Poland	5.10	q
3	Jurij Rovan	Slovenia	5.10	q
3	Scott Slover	United States	5.10	q
7	Vesa Rantanen	Finland	5.00	q
8	Martin Heller	Germany	5.00	
9	Fedja Kamasi	Yugoslavia	4.80	
10	Dennis Kholev	Israel	4.80	
11	Ákos Kovács	Hungary	4.80	
12	Satoru Yasuda	Japan	4.80	
	Andrea Giannini	Italy	NH	

== Participation ==
According to an unofficial count, 26 athletes from 17 countries participated in the event.

- Belarus (1)
- Czech Republic (2)
- Finland (2)
- France (2)
- Germany (1)
- Hungary (1)
- Israel (1)
- Italy (2)
- Japan (2)
- Latvia (1)
- Poland (2)
- Russia (2)
- Slovenia (2)
- Spain (1)
- Tonga (1)
- United States (2)
- Yugoslavia (1)
