= Athletics at the 2006 Commonwealth Games – Men's pole vault =

Men's pole vault at the Commonwealth Games

The men's pole vault event at the 2006 Commonwealth Games was held on March 24.

== Results ==
Rank	Athlete	Nationality	4.90	5.05	5.20	5.35	5.50	5.60	5.70	5.75	5.80	6.01	Result	Notes
1st place, gold medalist(s)	Steven Hooker	Australia	–	–	–	–	–	o	o	–	o	xxx	5.80	GR
2nd place, silver medalist(s)	Dmitri Markov	Australia	–	–	–	–	xxo	o	x–	xx			5.60	
3rd place, bronze medalist(s)	Steven Lewis	England	–	–	xo	o	xo	xxx					5.50	
4	Nick Buckfield	England	–	–	–	o	xxx						5.35	
5	Dominic Johnson	Saint Lucia	–	–	–	xo	xxx						5.35	
6	Scott Simpson	Wales	o	o	o	xxx							5.20	
	Paul Burgess	Australia	–	–	–	–	–	xxx					NM	
