= 2001 IAAF World Indoor Championships – Men's pole vault =

The men's pole vault event at the 2001 IAAF World Indoor Championships was held on March 10.

== Results ==
Rank	Athlete	Nationality	5.30	5.45	5.60	5.70	5.80	5.85	5.90	5.95	6.01	Result	Notes
1st place, gold medalist(s)	Lawrence Johnson	United States	–	–	–	o	–	o	–	xxo	xxx	5.95	
2nd place, silver medalist(s)	Tye Harvey	United States	–	o	o	o	o	xx–	o	xxx		5.90	
3rd place, bronze medalist(s)	Romain Mesnil	France	–	o	–	o	o	o	x–	xx		5.85	
4	Aleksandr Averbukh	Israel	–	o	–	xo	xx–	x				5.70	
5	Pavel Gerasimov	Russia	–	o	xxo	xo	x					5.70	PB
6	Montxu Miranda	Spain	–	o	–	xxo	xx–	x				5.70	SB
7	Okkert Brits	South Africa	–	–	o	xxx						5.60	
8	Štěpán Janáček	Czech Republic	o	o	xo	xxx						5.60	
9	Nuno Fernandes	Portugal	o	o	xxx							5.45	
9	Michael Stolle	Germany	–	o	–	xxx						5.45	
