= Derek Miles =

American pole vaulter (born 1972)

Personal information
- Born: September 28, 1972 (age 54) Tea, South Dakota, United States
- Height: 1.91 m (6 ft 3 in)
- Weight: 88 kg (194 lb)

Sport
- Country: United States
- Sport: Athletics
- Event: Pole Vault
Medal record
Olympic Games
| Bronze medal – third place | 2008 Beijing | Pole vault |
- Updated on 17 April 2017

Derek Miles (born September 28, 1972) is an American pole vaulter, from Tea, South Dakota. A former pole vaulter for the University of South Dakota Track and Field team, Miles is currently an assistant coach for the Coyotes. In 2004, he placed seventh in the Summer Olympic Games in Athens, Greece. Miles was originally at fourth place in the 2008 Summer Olympics in Beijing, China, but Ukrainian Denys Yurchenko who originally finished third, was disqualified in November 2016 due to use of dehydrochlormethyltestosterone. On 17 April 2017, Derek Miles received the Olympic bronze medal.

His personal best vault is 5.85 metres, achieved in September 2008 in Berlin. The vault, completed next to the Brandenburg Gate, was part of a promotional competition for the 2009 World Championships in Athletics. Miles trains with Earl Bell in Jonesboro, Arkansas, at Bell Athletics. He is represented by Karen Locke.

He attended Bella Vista High School in Fair Oaks, California.

== Achievements ==
| Year | Competition | Venue | Position | Notes |
Representing the United States
| 2003 | World Indoor Championships | Birmingham, England | 5th | 5.70 m |
| 2003 | World Championships | Paris, France | 6th | 5.70 m |
| 2003 | World Athletics Final | Monte Carlo, Monaco | 5th | 5.70 m |
| 2004 | Olympic Games | Athens, Greece | 7th | 5.75 m |
| 2004 | World Athletics Final | Monte Carlo, Monaco | 3rd | 5.70 m |
| 2005 | World Athletics Final | Monte Carlo, Monaco | 5th | 5.60 m |
| 2008 | U.S. Olympic Trials | Eugene, Oregon | 1st | 5.80 m |
| 2008 | Olympic Games | Beijing, China | 3rd | 5.70 m |
| 2008 | World Athletics Final | Stuttgart, Germany | 1st | 5.80 m |
| 2010 | Continental Cup | Split, Croatia | 3rd | 5.75 m |
| 2011 | World Championships | Daegu, South Korea | 13th | 5.65 m |
