= Athletics at the 2001 Summer Universiade – Men's pole vault =

The men's pole vault event at the 2001 Summer Universiade was held at the Workers Stadium in Beijing, China on 30 August.

== Results ==
| Rank | Athlete | Nationality | Result | Notes |
|---|---|---|---|---|
| 1st place, gold medalist(s) | Aleksandr Averbukh | Israel | 5.80 | |
| 2nd place, silver medalist(s) | Štěpán Janáček | Czech Republic | 5.70 | |
| 3rd place, bronze medalist(s) | Laurens Looije | Netherlands | 5.60 | |
| 4 | Russ Buller | United States | 5.60 | |
| 5 | Piotr Buciarski | Denmark | 5.50 | |
| 6 | Ruslan Yeremenko | Ukraine | 5.35 | |
| 7 | Björn Otto | Germany | 5.35 | |
| 8 | Kiyonobu Kigoshi | Japan | 5.20 | |
| | Richard Spiegelburg | Germany | NM | |
| | Ryan Hvidston | Canada | NM | |
| | Xu Gang | China | NM | |
| | Tiberiu Agoston | Romania | NM | |
| | Denis Kholev | Israel | NM | |
| | Javier Benítez | Argentina | NM | |
| | Pierre-Charles Peuf | France | NM | |
| | Brian Hunter | United States | DNS | |
