= Kim Yoo-suk =

South Korean pole vaulter (born 1982)

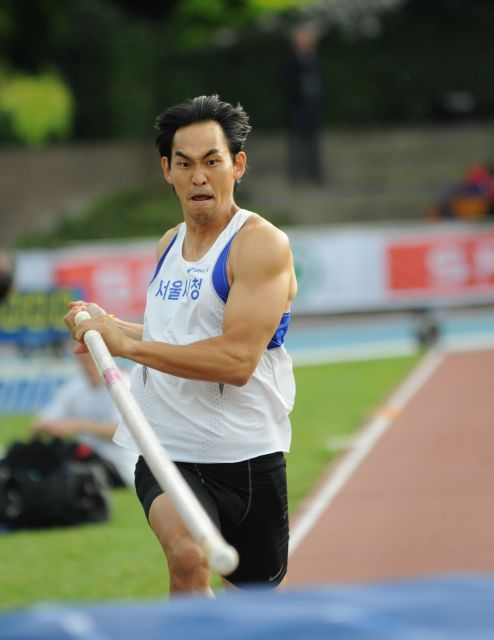

Personal information
- Born: 19 January 1982 (age 44) Gwangju, South Korea
- Height: 1.91 m (6 ft 3 in)
- Weight: 84 kg (185 lb)

Sport
- Country: South Korea
- Sport: Athletics
- Event: Pole Vault
- Updated on 11 August 2012

Kim Yoo-suk (Korean: 김유석, born 19 January 1982) is a South Korean pole vaulter.

He finished ninth at the 2003 Universiade. He also competed at the 2004 Olympic Games and the 2005 World Championships without reaching the final.

His personal best jump is 5.66 metres, achieved in July 2005 in Livermore.

== Competition record ==
| Year | Competition | Venue | Position | Notes |
Representing South Korea
| 2000 | World Junior Championships | Santiago, Chile | 24th (q) | 4.80 m |
| 2003 | Universiade | Daegu, South Korea | 8th | 5.30 m |
| 2004 | World Indoor Championships | Budapest, Hungary | — | NM |
| 2004 | Olympic Games | Athens, Greece | 33rd (q) | 5.30 m |
| 2005 | World Championships | Helsinki, Finland | — | NM |
| 2005 | Universiade | İzmir, Turkey | – | NM |
| 2006 | Asian Games | Doha, Qatar | — | NM |
| 2008 | Olympic Games | Beijing, China | — | NM |
| 2009 | World Championships | Berlin, Germany | 16th (q) | 5.55 m |
| 2010 | World Indoor Championships | Doha, Qatar | 10th (q) | 5.45 m |
| 2010 | Asian Games | Guangzhou, China | 2nd | 5.30 m |
| 2011 | World Championships | Daegu, South Korea | 26th (q) | 5.20 m |
| 2012 | Olympic Games | London, United Kingdom | — | NM |
