= Javier Gazol =

Spanish pole vaulter (born 1980)

Personal information
- Full name: Javier Sebastián Gazol Condón
- Nationality: Spain
- Born: 27 October 1980 (age 45) Zaragoza, Spain
- Height: 1.91 m (6 ft 3 in)
- Weight: 86 kg (190 lb)

Sport
- Sport: Athletics
- Event: Pole vault
- Club: Transbaso Monzón Polidux
- Coached by: Hans Ruf

Achievements and titles
- Personal best: Pole vault: 5.60 (2004)

Javier Sebastián Gazol Condón (Note: In this Spanish name, the first or paternal surname is Gazol and the second or maternal family name is Condón.) (born 27 October 1980 in Zaragoza), known as Javier Gazol, is a Spanish pole vaulter. Representing his nation Spain in the men's pole vault at the 2004 Summer Olympics, Gazol cleared a height at 5.60 metres to set his own personal best from the Spanish Championships in Almería. Throughout his sporting career, Gazol trained for the track and field club Transbaso Monzón Polidux, under his personal coach Hans Ruf.

Gazol qualified for the Spanish squad as a lone athlete in the men's pole vault at the 2004 Summer Olympics in Athens. Nearly a week before the Games commenced, Gazol improved his personal best and an Olympic B-standard of 5.60 m to earn a spot on the Spanish team at the national championships in Almería. Gazol successfully vaulted 5.30 m on his first attempt, but failed to raise the bar at a targeted height of 5.50 m after three straight misses, leaving him in a twenty-eighth place draw with Czech Republic's Štěpán Janáček and Australia's Steven Hooker at the end of the qualifying round.
