= Vesa Rantanen =

Finnish pole vaulter (born 1975)

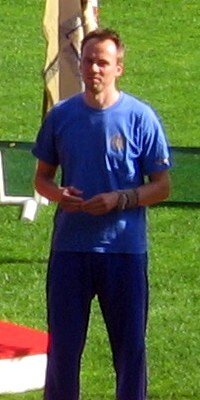
Vesa Rantanen in Kalevan kisat 2008

Vesa Rantanen (born 2 December 1975 in Jalasjärvi) is a retired Finnish pole vaulter.

He competed at the World Championships in 1997 and 1999, the 2002 European Championships and the 2004 Olympic Games without ever reaching the final.

Competing for the Minnesota Golden Gophers track and field team, Rantanen won the 1998 pole vault at the NCAA Division I Indoor Track and Field Championships with a jump of 5.55 metres.

His personal best vault is 5.72 metres, achieved in July 2001 in Hamburg. The Finnish record currently belongs to Jani Lehtonen with 5.82 metres.

== Competition record ==
Year	Competition	Venue	Position	Notes
Representing Finland
1994	World Junior Championships	Lisbon, Portugal	11th (q)	5.00 m
1997	European U23 Championships	Turku, Finland	4th	5.50 m
1997	World Championships	Athens, Greece	23rd (q)	5.45 m
1998	European Championships	Budapest, Hungary	17th (q)	5.30 m
2001	World Championships	Edmonton, Canada	20th (q)	5.50 m
2002	European Indoor Championships	Vienna, Austria	15th (q)	5.25 m
2003	Universiade	Daegu, South Korea	6th	5.40 m
2004	Olympic Games	Athens, Greece	22nd (q)	5.50 m
2005	European Indoor Championships	Madrid, Spain	11th (q)	5.60 m
2010	European Championships	Barcelona, Spain	17th (q)	5.50 m
