= Nick Buckfield =

British athlete

Personal information
- Nationality: British (English)
- Born: 5 June 1973 (age 53) Crawley, West Sussex, England
- Height: 185 cm (6 ft 1 in)
- Weight: 77.5 kg (171 lb)

Sport
- Sport: Athletics
- Event: Pole vault
- Club: Crawley AC

Nicholas Jean Buckfield (born 5 June 1973) is a former pole vaulter from England who competed at the 1996 Summer Olympics and the 2004 Summer Olympics.

== Biography ==
During his youth he was a talented footballer, turning down a youth training contract with Aldershot F.C. at the age of 16. He was educated at Brunel University London, where he studied Religious Studies and Sports Sciences.

He finished fifth in the 1997 World Championships and narrowly missed out on medals at the 2002 and 2006 Commonwealth Games.

Buckfield was a five-times British pole vault champion after winning the British AAA Championships title in 1995, 1996, 2002, 2003 and 2005.

His personal best jump was 5.80 metres, achieved in May 1998 in Chania. This was a British national record, which he held for 14 years until Steven Lewis broke it in 2012. His indoor best was 5.81 metres, achieved in February 2002 in Bad Segeberg. This was also a British national record, and stood for 12 years until it was bettered by Luke Cutts in 2014.

His career suffered setbacks due to a series of injuries, fracturing his pelvis whilst competing at the 1998 European Athletics Championships, suffering an abdominal injury after falling onto his pole at a meeting in Cottbus in 2004, and sustaining an Achilles tendon rupture in 2006. He retired from competition in 2008.

== Competition record ==
Year	Competition	Venue	Position	Notes
Representing Great Britain and England
1992	World Junior Championships	Seoul, South Korea	12th	4.90 m
1994	Commonwealth Games	Victoria, British Columbia, Canada	8th	5.20 m
1995	World Championships	Gothenburg, Sweden	17th (q)	5.55 m
1996	European Indoor Championships	Stockholm, Sweden	7th	5.55 m
1996	Olympic Games	Atlanta, United States	21st (q)	5.40 m
1997	World Championships	Athens, Greece	5th	5.70 m
1998	European Indoor Championships	Valencia, Spain	17th (q)	5.55 m
1998	European Championships	Budapest, Hungary	17th (q)	5.30 m
1999	World Indoor Championships	Maebashi, Japan	–	NM
2001	World Championships	Edmonton, Alberta, Canada	22nd (q)	5.30 m
2002	European Indoor Championships	Vienna, Austria	14th (q)	5.40 m
2002	Commonwealth Games	Manchester, United Kingdom	4th	5.50 m
2003	World Championships	Paris, France	21st (q)	5.50 m
2004	Olympic Games	Athens, Greece	21st (q)	5.60 m
2005	European Indoor Championships	Madrid, Spain	15th (q)	5.40 m
2006	Commonwealth Games	Melbourne, Australia	4th	5.35 m
