= Danny Ecker =

German pole vaulter

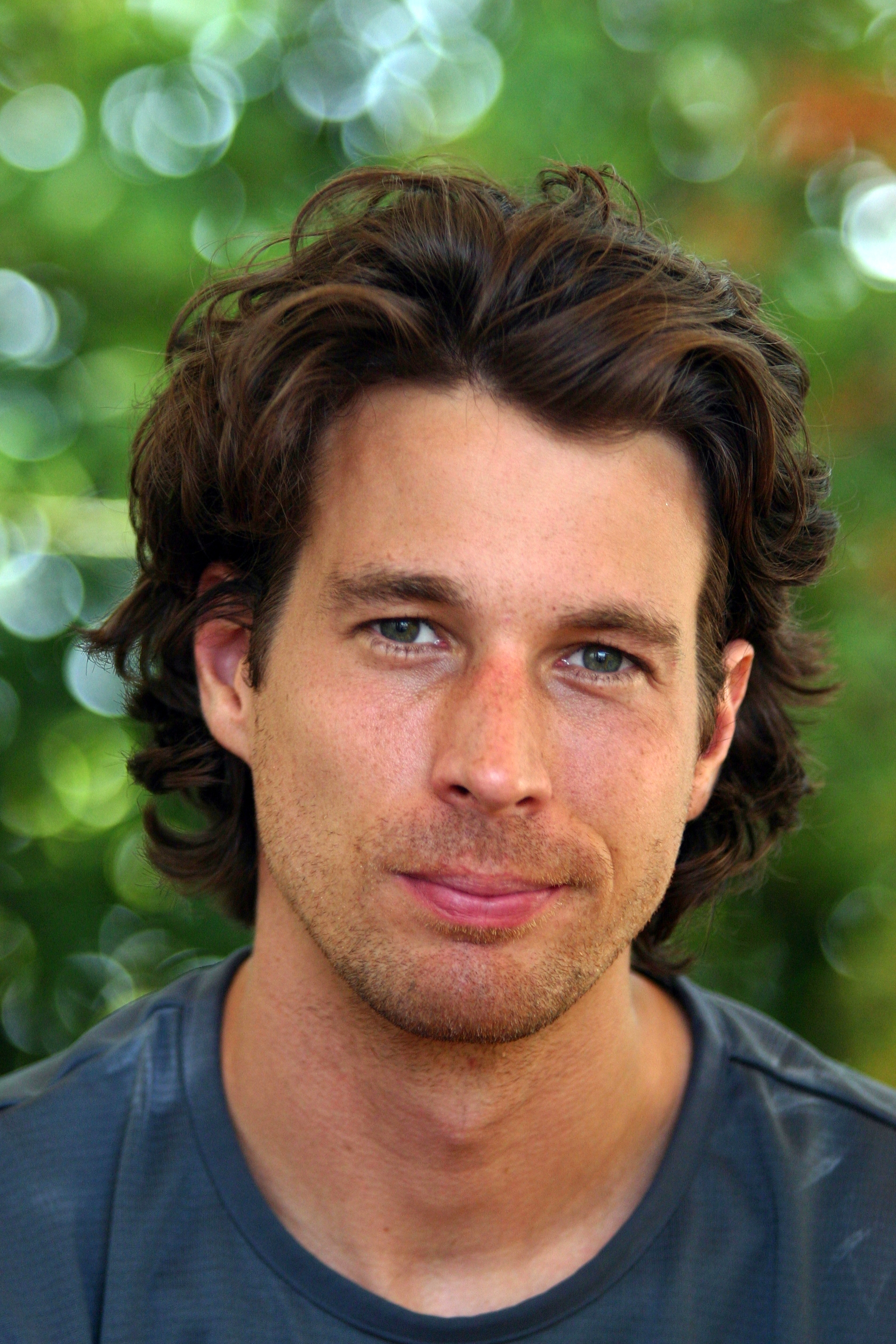

Personal information
- Full name: Daniel Ecker
- Born: 21 July 1977 (age 48) Leverkusen, West Germany
Medal record
Men's athletics
Representing Germany
World Championships
Bronze medal – third place	2007 Osaka	Pole vault
World Indoor Championships
Bronze medal – third place	1999 Maebashi	Pole vault
European Indoor Championships
Gold medal – first place	2007 Birmingham	Pole vault
Bronze medal – third place	1998 Valencia	Pole vault

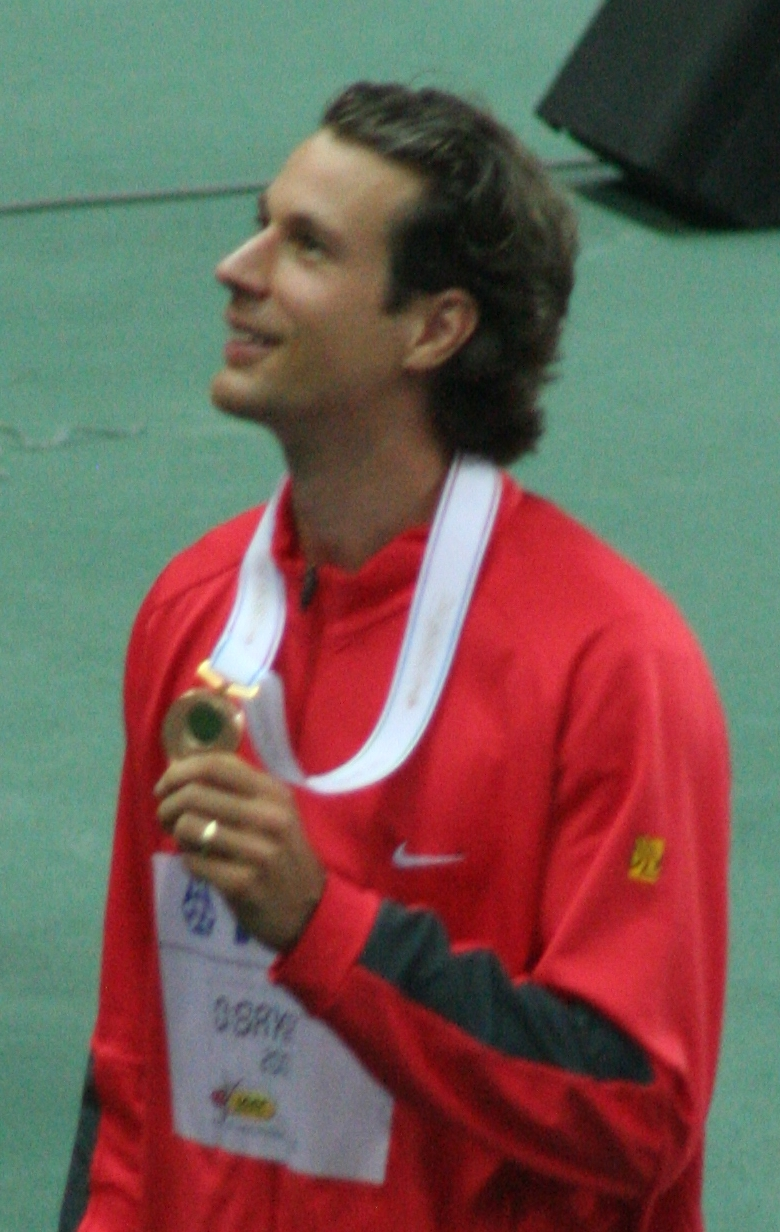
Ecker at the 2007 World Championships

Daniel Ecker (born 21 July 1977 in Leverkusen) is a former German athlete competing in the pole vault.

== Biography ==
His current personal best is 5.93 metres, but through his indoor best performance of 6.00 metres he has a place in the so-called 6 metres club. 5.93 ranks him fourth among German pole vaulters, behind Tim Lobinger, Andrei Tivontchik and Michael Stolle.

He won a bronze medal at the 2007 IAAF World Championships and the 1999 IAAF World Indoor Championships and placed fourth at the 1999 World Championships. At the Olympic Games he finished eighth in 2000 and fifth in 2004. He won the 2007 European Athletics Indoor Championships.

Danny Ecker is the son of Heide Rosendahl, who became Olympic long jump champion in 1972, and US basketball player John Ecker. His team is Bayer 04 Leverkusen. Danny Ecker married in 2006. He has two daughters.

He stated that he would retire from competition at the end of the 2012 season after he missed the German Championships (and qualification for the European Championships and Olympic Games) due to an injury.

== Competition record ==
Year	Competition	Venue	Position	Notes
Representing Germany
1996	World Junior Championships	Sydney, Australia	3rd	5.30 m
1997	European U23 Championships	Turku, Finland	15th (q)	5.20 m
1998	European Indoor Championships	Valencia, Spain	3rd	5.75 m
1998	European Championships	Budapest, Hungary	4th	5.76 m
1999	World Indoor Championships	Maebashi, Japan	3rd	5.85 m
1999	European U23 Championships	Gothenburg, Sweden	5th	5.50 m
1999	World Championships	Seville, Spain	4th	5.70 m
2000	Olympic Games	Sydney, Australia	8th	5.80 m
2001	World Championships	Edmonton, Canada	11th	5.65 m
2004	Olympic Games	Athens, Greece	5th	5.75 m
2005	World Championships	Helsinki, Finland	11th	NM
2007	European Indoor Championships	Birmingham, United Kingdom	1st	5.71 m
2007	World Championships	Osaka, Japan	3rd	5.81 m
2008	Olympic Games	Beijing, China	6th	5.70 m
2009	European Indoor Championships	Turin, Italy	9th (q)	5.65 m

== See also ==
- Germany all-time top lists - Pole vault
