= Ruslan Yeremenko =

Ukrainian pole vaulter

Ruslan Yeremenko (born 31 July 1978) is a Ukrainian pole vaulter.

His personal best jump is 5.70 metres, achieved in July 2001 in Kyiv. He had 5.84 metres on the indoor track, achieved in January 2005 in Stuttgart.

== Achievements ==
Year	Competition	Venue	Position	Notes
2001	Universiade	Beijing, China	6th	5.35 m
2002	European Indoor Championships	Ghent, Belgium	17th (q)	5.40 m
2004	Olympic Games	Athens, Greece	13th	5.55 m
2005	European Indoor Championships	Madrid, Spain	11th (q)	5.60 m
