= Aleksandr Averbukh =

Israeli pole vaulter

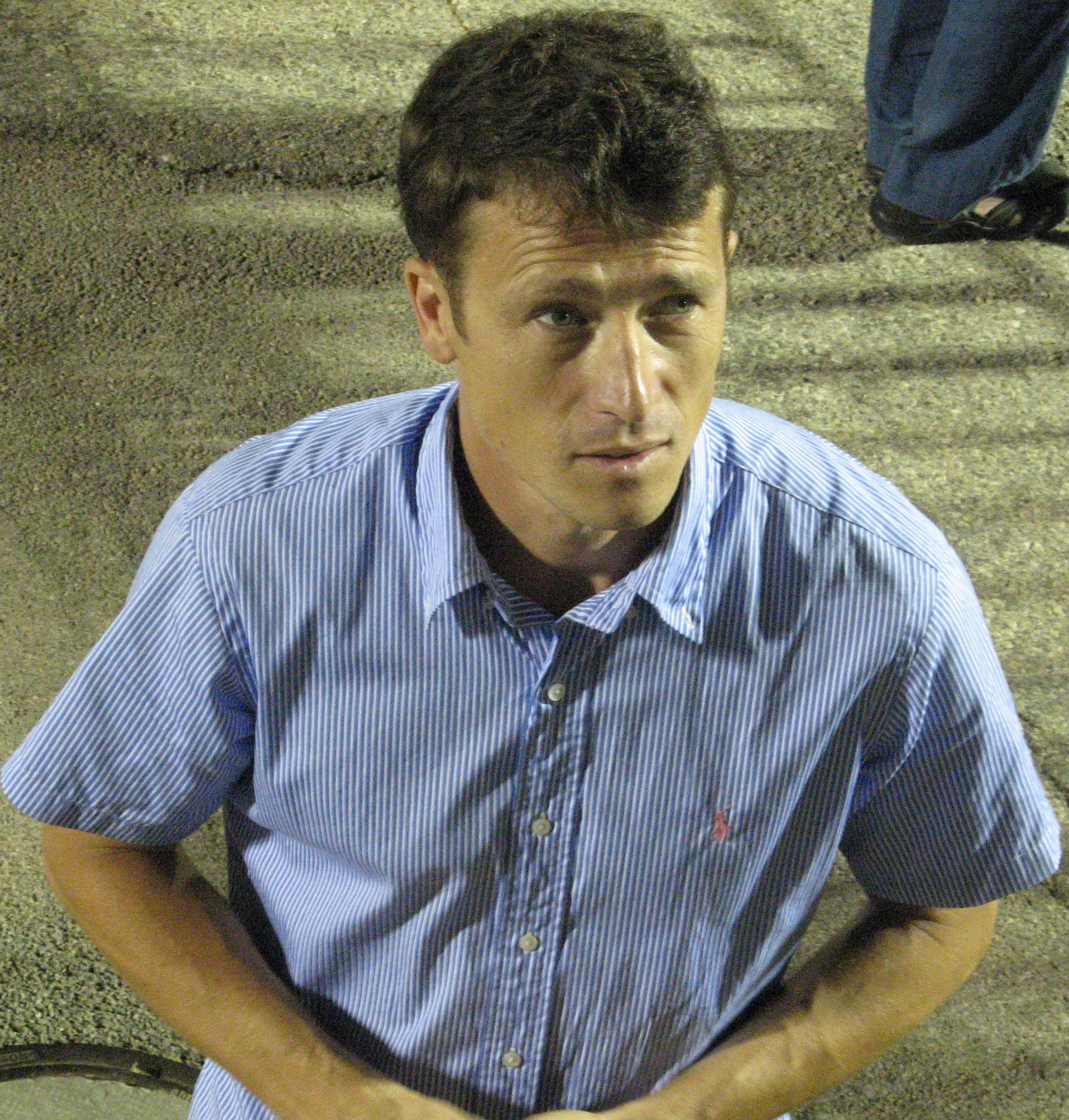
- Averbukh in 2011

Personal information
- Native name: Александр Валерьевич Авербух
- Nationality: Israeli
- Born: 1 October 1974 (age 52)

Sport
- Country: Russia (–1998); Israel (1999–2009)
- Sport: Athletics
- Event: Pole vault

Achievements and titles
- Olympic finals: 8th (2004)
- World finals: (silver) (2001)
- Regional finals: (gold) (2000, 2002, 2006)
- Personal best: 5.93 m (2003)
Medal record
Men's athletics
Representing Israel
World Championships
Silver medal – second place	2001 Edmonton	Pole vault
Bronze medal – third place	1999 Seville	Pole vault
European Championships
Gold medal – first place	2002 Munich	Pole vault
Gold medal – first place	2006 Gothenburg	Pole vault
European Indoor Championships
Gold medal – first place	2000 Ghent	Pole vault
Maccabiah Games
Gold medal – first place	2013 Tel Aviv	Pole vault
Silver medal – second place	2009 Tel Aviv	Pole vault
Summer Universiade
Gold medal – first place	2001 Beijing	Pole vault

Aleksandr "Alex" Valeryevich Averbukh (Hebrew: אלכס אברבוך, Russian: Александр Валерьевич Авербух; born October 1, 1974) is a Russian retired decathlete and Israeli Olympic athlete, who competed in the pole vault.

He won silver and bronze medals at the World Championships, won a gold medal as the European champion in both 2002 and 2006, and won a gold medal at the 2013 Maccabiah Games. His personal best is 5.93 metres.

== Biography ==
He was born in the Russian SSR, Soviet Union, and is Jewish. He was formerly a decathlete competing for Russia, but he later became an Israeli citizen and rose to top level in pole vault. He competed in the 2001 Maccabiah Games, winning a gold medal.

He won silver and bronze medals at the World Championships and won a gold medal twice as the European champion in 2002 and 2006. His personal best is 5.93 metres, achieved in 2003 in Madrid. He retired from competition in 2009.

He competed on behalf of Israel at the 2008 Summer Olympics in Beijing, China.

He competed in the pole vault at the 2009 Maccabiah Games.

In 2013 he briefly returned from retirement to compete in the 2013 Maccabiah Games, where he won a gold medal for first place.

One of his daughters is the model Anastasya Averbukh.

== Achievements ==
Year	Competition	Venue	Position	Event	Notes
Representing Russia
1993	European Junior Championships	San Sebastián, Spain	13th (q)	Pole vault	4.90 m
1998	European Indoor Championships	Valencia, Spain	6th	Heptathlon	6144 pts
1998	Hypo-Meeting	Götzis, Austria	16th	Decathlon	7658 pts
Representing Israel
1999	World Championships	Seville, Spain	3rd	Pole vault	5.80 m
2000	European Indoor Championships	Ghent, Belgium	1st	Pole vault	5.75 m
2000	Olympic Games	Sydney, Australia	10th	Pole vault	5.50 m
2001	World Indoor Championships	Lisbon, Portugal	4th	Pole vault	5.70 m
2001	World Championships	Edmonton, Canada	2nd	Pole vault	5.85 m
2001	Universiade	Beijing, China	1st	Pole vault	5.80 m
2001	Goodwill Games	Brisbane, Australia	2nd	Pole vault	5.80 m
2001	Maccabiah Games		1st	Pole vault	
2002	European Championships	Munich, Germany	1st	Pole vault	5.85 m
2002	IAAF Grand Prix Final	Paris, France	2nd	Pole vault	5.75 m
2003	World Indoor Championships	Birmingham, United Kingdom	14th (q)	Pole vault	5.40 m
2003	World Championships	Paris, France	–	Pole vault	NM
2004	World Indoor Championships	Budapest, Hungary	14th (q)	Pole vault	5.55 m
2004	Olympic Games	Athens, Greece	8th	Pole vault	5.65 m
2004	World Athletics Final	Monte Carlo, Monaco	4th	Pole vault	5.60 m
2006	World Indoor Championships	Moscow, Russia	4th	Pole vault	5.50 m
2006	European Championships	Gothenburg, Sweden	1st	Pole vault	5.70 m
2007	World Championships	Osaka, Japan	7th	Pole vault	5.81 m
2008	Olympic Games	Beijing, China	28th (q)	Pole vault	5.45 m
2009	Maccabiah Games	Tel Aviv, Israel	2nd	Pole vault	4.95 m
2013	Maccabiah Games	Jerusalem, Israel	1st	Pole vault	5.15 m

== See also ==
- List of eligibility transfers in athletics
- List of Jewish track and field athletes
- List of Israeli records in athletics
- List of Maccabiah records in athletics
