= Rens Blom =

Dutch pole vaulter

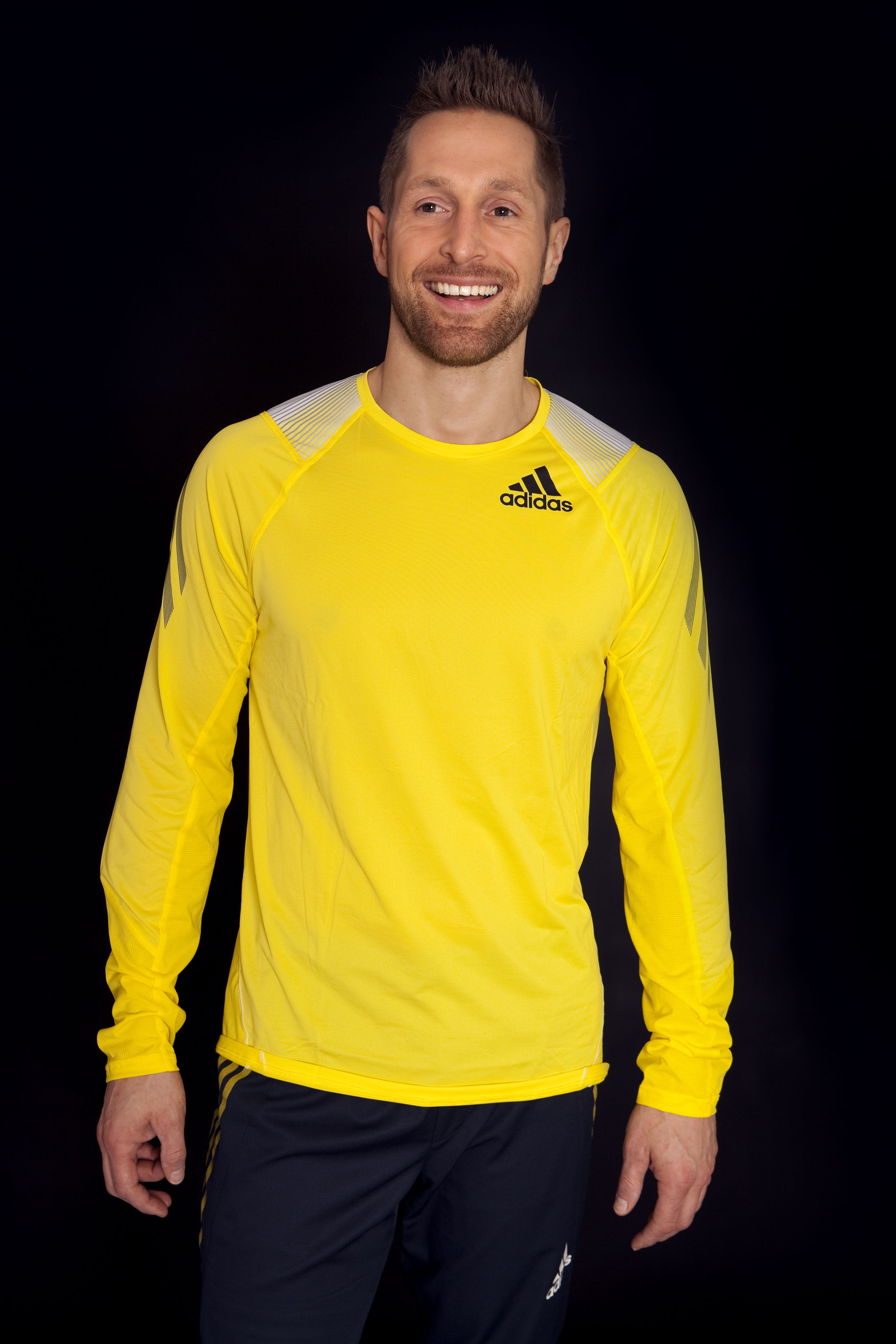
- Blom in a 2014 portrait

Personal information
- Born: 1 March 1977 (age 49) Munstergeleen, Netherlands
- Years active: 1989-2008
- Height: 1.78 m (5 ft 10 in)
- Weight: 75 kg (165 lb)

Achievements and titles
- Personal best: pole vault - 5.81 (2005)
Medal record
Men's athletics
World Championships
Gold medal – first place	2005 Helsinki	Pole vault
World Indoor Championships
Bronze medal – third place	2003 Birmingham	Pole vault
European Indoor Championships
Bronze medal – third place	2000 Ghent	Pole vault
- Updated on 2 April 2009

Rens Blom (Dutch: [rɛnz ˈblɔm]; born 1 March 1977) is a Dutch retired track and field athlete who competed in the pole vault. He is the 2005 world champion and former Dutch record holder with personal bests of 5.81 m outdoor and 5.75 m indoor.

== Life ==
Blom was born in Munstergeleen. He achieved a vault of 5.75 as early as in 2000, but five years passed without much further progress. However, on 8 June 2004 in Zaragoza, he set the Dutch record with 5.81. In 2005, he consolidated his position by clearing 5.80 early in May.

At the 2005 World Championships in Athletics, he once again achieved 5.80 and won the gold medal. It was the first Dutch gold medal at a World Championship. In addition, Blom has won five national championships and four national indoor championships.

The year 2006 turned out to be a frustrating year for Blom, full of bad luck and injuries. Problems with his shoulder, knees and Achilles tendons resulting in an operation caused 2006 to become a "lost" year for the passionate Dutchman. Finally, in mid-October, he cautiously resumed his training programme, and achieved better results in several indoor events at the start of 2007.

Blom is a two-time Olympian. At the 2000 Summer Olympics in Sydney he did not survive the qualification round. Four years later during the 2004 Summer Olympics, he ended up on the 9th place.

At a press conference in Sittard on 26 September 2008, Blom announced his retirement from the sport, feeling that, after various injuries and operations, his body no longer allowed him to strain it to the utmost. During his career Rens Blom collected six Dutch indoor and seven Dutch outdoor titles altogether. He returned to the sport in the 2013 season.

== Competition record ==
Year	Competition	Venue	Position	Notes
Representing Netherlands
1995	European Junior Championships	Nyíregyháza, Hungary	–	NM
1997	European U23 Championships	Turku, Finland	10th	5.20 m
1997	Universiade	Catania, Italy	4th	5.55 m
1998	European Indoor Championships	Valencia, Spain	19th (q)	5.55 m
1999	European U23 Championships	Gothenburg, Sweden	5th	5.50 m
2000	European Indoor Championships	Ghent, Belgium	3rd	5.60 m
2000	Olympic Games	Sydney, Australia	15th (q)	5.65 m
2001	World Championships	Edmonton, Canada	13th	NM
2002	European Championships	Munich, Germany	22nd (q)	5.25 m
2003	World Indoor Championships	Birmingham, United Kingdom	3rd	5.75 m (iNR)
2003	World Championships	Paris, France	14th (q)	5.60 m
2004	World Indoor Championships	Budapest, Hungary	8th	NM
2004	Olympic Games	Athens, Greece	9th	5.65 m
2005	World Championships	Helsinki, Finland	1st	5.80 m
2007	European Indoor Championships	Birmingham, United Kingdom	9th (q)	5.55 m

Awards
Preceded by Chiel Warners as Herman van Leeuwen Cup	Men's Dutch Athlete of the Year; 2005	Succeeded by Bram Som
