= Piotr Buciarski =

Danish pole vaulter

Personal information
- Born: 22 November 1975 (age 50) Warsaw, Poland
- Home town: Copenhagen, Denmark

Sport
- Sport: Track and field

Piotr Buciarski (born 22 November 1975) is a Danish retired pole vaulter of Polish descent.

His personal best jump is 5.75 metres, achieved in April 2002 in Fort-de-France. This is the current national record. He represented Sparta and later the University of Oregon. Buciarski is a two-time national champion (2000 and 2002) in the men's decathlon.

He's the son of former Polish pole vaulter, Wojciech Buciarski. He is married to an American javelin thrower, Rachel Yurkovich.

== Competition record ==
Year	Competition	Venue	Position	Notes
Representing Denmark
1997	European U23 Championships	Turku, Finland	8th	5.20 m
1998	European Indoor Championships	Valencia, Spain	13th (q)	5.55 m
1998	European Championships	Budapest, Hungary	20th (q)	5.30 m
1999	Universiade	Palma de Mallorca, Spain	7th	5.40 m
2001	World Championships	Edmonton, Canada	15th (q)	5.60 m
2001	Universiade	Beijing, China	5th	5.50 m
2002	European Indoor Championships	Vienna, Austria	7th	5.50 m
2002	European Championships	Munich, Germany	11th	5.50 m
2003	World Indoor Championships	Birmingham, United Kingdom	13th (q)	5.40 m
2003	World Championships	Paris, France	23rd (q)	5.35 m
2004	World Indoor Championships	Budapest, Hungary	18th (q)	5.45 m
2004	Olympic Games	Athens, Greece	26th (q)	5.50 m
2005	World Championships	Helsinki, Finland	20th (q)	5.30 m
