= Jurij Rovan =

Slovenian pole vaulter (born 1975)

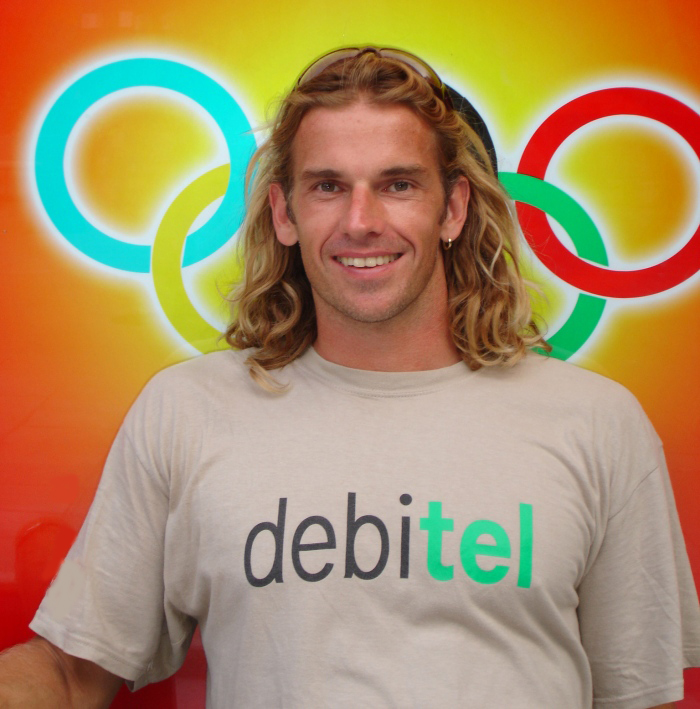

Personal information
- Born: 23 January 1975 (age 51) Brežice, Yugoslavia

Sport
- Sport: Track and field

Jurij Rovan (born 23 January 1975) is a Slovenian pole vaulter.

He competed at the 2002 European Indoor Championships, the 2002 European Championships, the 2004 Olympic Games, the 2005 World Championships and the 2008 Olympic Games without reaching the final round.

His personal best jump is 5.61 metres, achieved in July 2004 in Zagreb.

== Competition record ==
Year	Competition	Venue	Position	Notes
Representing Slovenia
1994	World Junior Championships	Lisbon, Portugal	8th	5.10 m
1995	Universiade	Fukuoka, Japan	–	NM
1997	Mediterranean Games	Bari, Italy	8th	5.00 m
1997	European U23 Championships	Turku, Finland	11th	5.20 m
1997	World Championships	Athens, Greece	–	NM
1997	Universiade	Catania, Italy	5th	5.40 m
1998	European Championships	Budapest, Hungary	9th	5.50 m
1999	Universiade	Palma de Mallorca, Spain	10th	5.20 m
2001	Mediterranean Games	Radès, Tunisia	7th	5.05 m
2002	European Indoor Championships	Vienna, Austria	19th (q)	5.20 m
2002	European Championships	Munich, Germany	18th (q)	5.25 m
2004	Olympic Games	Athens, Greece	25th (q)	5.50 m
2005	Mediterranean Games	Almería, Spain	–	NM
2005	World Championships	Helsinki, Finland	19th (q)	5.30 m
2008	Olympic Games	Beijing, China	32nd (q)	5.30 m
2009	World Championships	Berlin, Germany	26th (q)	5.40 m
2010	European Championships	Barcelona, Spain	15th (q)	5.50 m
