= Montxu Miranda =

Spanish pole vaulter (born 1976)

Montxu Miranda Díez (born 27 December 1976 in Santurce) is a Spanish pole vaulter. His personal best of 5.81 metres, achieved in September 2000 in Barcelona, is still the standing Spanish national record as of 2019.

== Achievements ==
Year	Competition	Venue	Position	Event	Notes
Representing Spain
1994	World Junior Championships	Lisbon, Portugal	18th (q)	Pole vault	4.80 m
1995	European Junior Championships	Nyíregyháza, Hungary	9th	Pole vault	5.00 m
1997	World Indoor Championships	Paris, France	17th (q)	Pole vault	5.30 m
1997	European U23 Championships	Turku, Finland	2nd	Pole vault	5.50 m
1997	Mediterranean Games	Bari, Italy	5th	Pole vault	5.30 m
1998	European Indoor Championships	Valencia, Spain	4th	Pole vault	5.70 m
1998	Ibero American Championships	Lisbon, Portugal	1st	Pole vault	5.60 m (CR)
1999	World Championships	Seville, Spain	11th (q)	Pole vault	5.65 m
2000	European Indoor Championships	Ghent, Belgium	–	Pole vault	NM
2000	Olympic Games	Sydney, Australia	9th	Pole vault	5.70 m
2001	World Indoor Championships	Lisbon, Portugal	6th	Pole vault	5.70 m
2001	World Championships	Edmonton, Canada	17th (q)	Pole vault	5.60 m
2002	European Indoor Championships	Vienna, Austria	–	Pole vault	NM
