= Khalid Lachheb =

French pole vaulter (born 1975)

Personal information
- Born: 16 January 1975 (age 51) Paris, France

Sport
- Sport: Track and field
Medal record
Representing France
Summer Universiade
Gold medal – first place	1997 Catania	Pole vault
Mediterranean Games
Bronze medal – third place	2001 Tunis	Pole vault

Khalid Lachheb (born 16 January 1975) is a retired pole vaulter from France.

He set his personal best (5.80 metres) on 25 August 1998 at a meet in Lausanne. He has a twin brother, Taoufik Lachheb, who is also a former pole vaulter (personal best at 5.72 metres). They were both students at Polytechnique (Paris, France), a well-known institution for engineering.

== Achievements ==
Year	Competition	Venue	Position	Notes
Representing France
1993	European Junior Championships	San Sebastián, Spain	1st	5.40 m
1997	European U23 Championships	Turku, Finland	5th	5.50 m
1997	World Championships	Athens, Greece	16th (q)	5.60 m
1997	Universiade	Catania, Italy	1st	5.70 m
1998	European Championships	Budapest, Hungary	5th	5.60 m
2000	European Indoor Championships	Ghent, Belgium	13th (q)	5.20 m
2001	Jeux de la Francophonie	Ottawa, Canada	3rd	5.40 m
2001	Mediterranean Games	Radès, Tunisia	3rd	5.40 m

== See also ==
- French all-time top lists - Pole vault
