= Richard Spiegelburg =

German pole vaulter

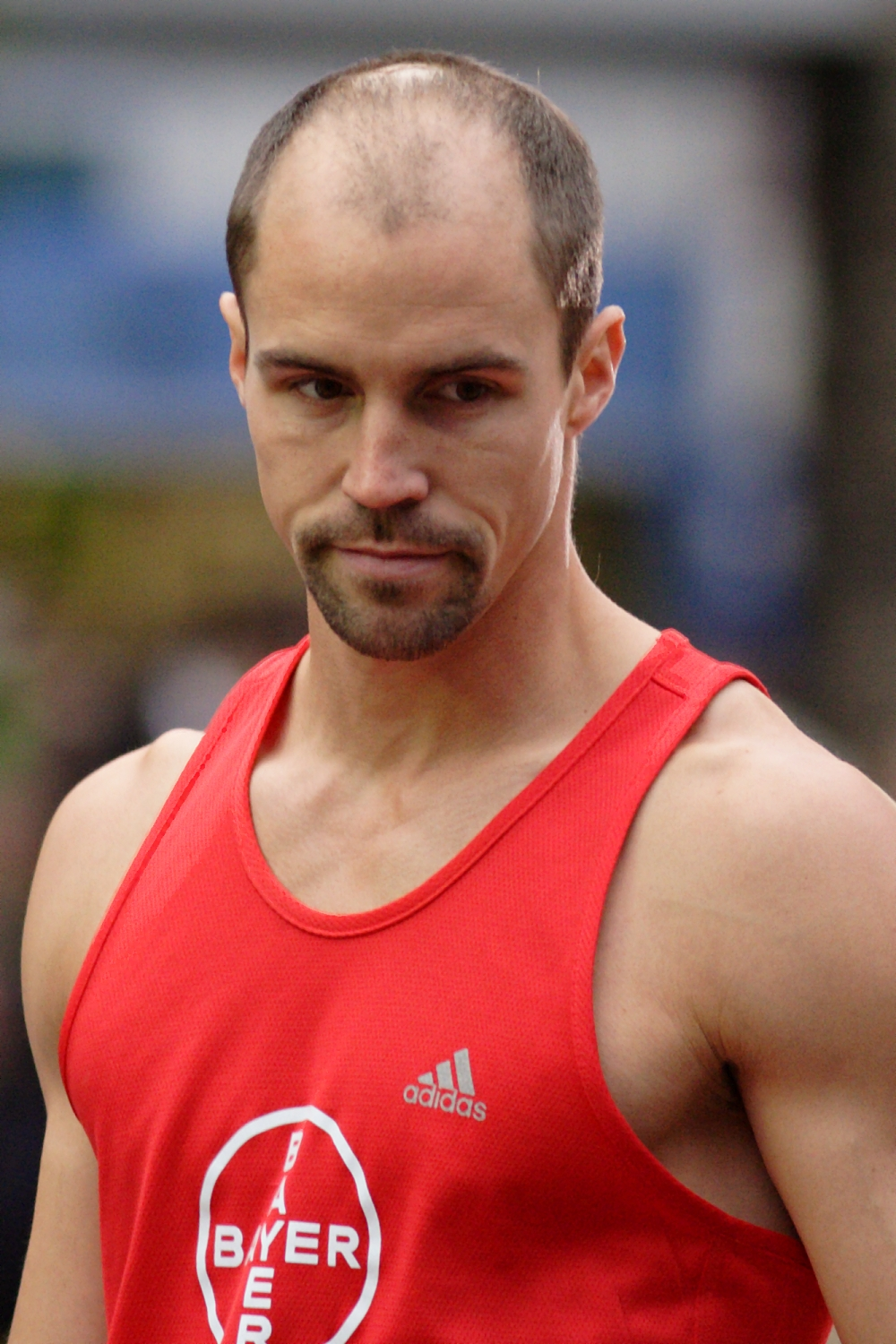
- Richard Spiegelburg in 2007

Personal information
- Born: 12 August 1977 (age 49) Georgsmarienhütte, West Germany

Sport
- Sport: Track and field
Medal record
Representing Germany
Summer Universiade
Gold medal – first place	1999 Palma de Mallorca	Pole vault

Richard Spiegelburg (born 12 August 1977) is a German pole vaulter. He is the older brother of Silke Spiegelburg.

== Biography ==
Spiegelburg was born on 12 August 1977 in Georgsmarienhütte. He won the 1999 Summer Universiade and finished fourth at the 2000 European Indoor Athletics Championships. He then finished sixth at the 2001 World Championships in Edmonton and eighth at the 2002 European Indoor Athletics Championships in Vienna.

After failing to progress from the qualifying round at the 2002 European Championships he fell out of the international spotlight for some years, but returned in 2005 with a fourth place at the Universiade. In 2006 he finished thirteenth at the 2006 European Championships in Gothenburg.

His personal best jump is 5.85 metres, achieved in June 2001 in Stuttgart. This ranks him eighth among German pole vaulters.

== Competition record ==
Year	Competition	Venue	Position	Notes
Representing Germany
1999	Universiade	Palma de Mallorca, Spain	1st	5.60 m
1999	European U23 Championships	Gothenburg, Sweden	4th	5.60 m
2000	European Indoor Championships	Ghent, Belgium	4th	5.60 m
2001	World Championships	Edmonton, Canada	6th	5.75 m
2001	Universiade	Beijing, China	–	NM
2002	European Indoor Championships	Vienna, Austria	8th	5.40 m
2002	European Championships	Munich, Germany	13th (q)	5.45 m
2003	World Championships	Paris, France	–	NM
2005	Universiade	İzmir, Turkey	4th	5.60 m
2006	European Championships	Gothenburg, Sweden	13th	5.40 m

== See also ==
- Germany all-time top lists - Pole vault
