= Štěpán Janáček =

Czech pole vaulter (born 1977)

Personal information
- Born: 12 June 1977 (age 49) Prague, Czechoslovakia

Sport
- Sport: Track and field
Medal record
Representing Czech Republic
Summer Universiade
Silver medal – second place	1999 Palma de Mallorca	Pole vault
Silver medal – second place	2001 Beijing	Pole vault

Štěpán Janáček (Czech pronunciation: [ˈʃcɛpaːn ˈjanaːtʃɛk]; born 12 June 1977) is a Czech former pole vaulter.

He finished eighth at the 2001 World Indoor Championships, second at the 2001 Summer Universiade and fifth at the 2002 European Championships. He also competed at the World Championships in 1999, 2001 and 2003 as well as the 2000, 2004 and 2008 Olympic Games without reaching the finals.

His personal best jump is 5.76 metres, achieved in June 2002 in Prague. The Czech record is currently held by Adam Ptáček with 5.80 metres.

He is married to a Polish former sprinter, Grażyna Prokopek.

== Competition record ==
Year	Competition	Venue	Position	Event	Notes
Representing the Czech Republic
1996	World Junior Championships	Sydney, Australia	15th (q)	Pole vault	5.00 m
1996	World Junior Championships	Sydney, Australia	4th	Decathlon	7276 pts
1999	Universiade	Palma de Mallorca, Spain	2nd	Pole vault	5.60 m
1999	European U23 Championships	Gothenburg, Sweden	8th	Pole vault	5.50 m
1999	World Championships	Seville, Spain	29th (q)	Pole vault	5.40 m
2000	Olympic Games	Sydney, Australia	14th (q)	Pole vault	5.65 m
2001	World Indoor Championships	Lisbon, Portugal	8th	Pole vault	5.60 m
2001	Jeux de la Francophonie	Ottawa, Canada	2nd	Pole vault	5.55 m
2001	World Championships	Edmonton, Canada	19th (q)	Pole vault	5.50 m
2001	Universiade	Beijing, PR China	2nd	Pole vault	5.70 m
2002	European Indoor Championships	Vienna, Austria	14th (q)	Pole vault	5.40 m
2002	European Championships	Munich, Germany	5th	Pole vault	5.75 m
2003	World Indoor Championships	Birmingham, United Kingdom	11th (q)	Pole vault	5.55 m
2003	World Championships	Paris, France	26th (q)	Pole vault	5.20 m
2004	Olympic Games	Athens, Greece	28th (q)	Pole vault	5.30 m
2006	European Championships	Gothenburg, Sweden	24th (q)	Pole vault	5.35 m
2008	Olympic Games	Beijing, China	30th (q)	Pole vault	5.30 m
