= Denys Yurchenko =

Ukrainian pole vaulter (born 1978)

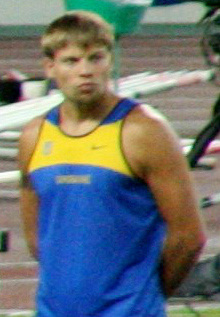
- Denys Yurchenko in 2007

Personal information
- Born: 27 January 1978 (age 48) Donetsk, Ukrainian SSR, Soviet Union
- Height: 1.75 m (5 ft 9 in)
- Weight: 75 kg (165 lb)

Sport
- Country: Ukraine
- Sport: Athletics
- Event: Pole Vault
Medal record
Olympic Games
Disqualified	2008 Beijing	Pole vault
World Indoor Championships
Bronze medal – third place	2004 Budapest	Pole vault
European Indoor Championships
Silver medal – second place	2005 Madrid	Pole vault
Silver medal – second place	2007 Birmingham	Pole vault

Denys Serhiyovych Yurchenko (Ukrainian: Денис Сергійович Юрченко) (born 27 January 1978 in Donetsk) is a Ukrainian pole vaulter with three medals in Indoor Athletics Championships.

== Career ==
At the 2000 Summer Olympics he suffered a mishap with a vaulting pole, injuring his groin and ending his season. He also initially won the bronze medal in the men's pole vault event at the 2008 Summer Olympics in Beijing.

On 17 November 2016, the IOC disqualified him from the 2008 Olympic Games, stripped his Olympic bronze medal and struck his results from the record for failing a drugs test in a re-analysis of his doping sample from 2008.

In May 2017, he was disqualified for two years.

His personal best jump (outdoor) is 5.83 metres, achieved in July 2008 in Kyiv.

== Competition record ==
Year	Competition	Venue	Position	Notes
Representing Ukraine
1999	European U23 Championships	Gothenburg, Sweden	13th (q)	5.20 m
2000	Olympic Games	Sydney, Australia	30th (q)	5.40 m
2002	European Indoor Championships	Vienna, Austria	–	NM
2002	European Championships	Munich, Germany	6th	5.70 m
2003	World Championships	Paris, France	6th	5.70 m
2004	World Indoor Championships	Budapest, Hungary	3rd	5.70 m
2004	Olympic Games	Athens, Greece	9th	5.65 m
2005	European Indoor Championships	Madrid, Spain	2nd	5.85 m
2005	World Championships	Helsinki, Finland	16th (q)	5.45 m
2006	World Indoor Championships	Moscow, Russia	—	NM
2006	European Championships	Gothenburg, Sweden	—	NM
2007	European Indoor Championships	Birmingham, United Kingdom	2nd	5.71 m
2007	World Championships	Osaka, Japan	12th	5.66 m
2008	World Indoor Championships	Valencia, Spain	16th (q)	5.35 m
2008	Olympic Games	Beijing, China	DSQ (3rd)	DSQ (5.70 m)
2010	European Championships	Barcelona, Spain	—	NM
2011	World Championships	Daegu, South Korea	22nd (q)	5.35 m
2012	European Championships	Helsinki, Finland	—	NM
2012	Olympic Games	London, United Kingdom	–	NM
