= Oscar Janson =

Swedish pole vaulter

Personal information
- Born: 22 July 1975 (age 51)

Sport
- Sport: Track and field

Oscar Janson (born 22 July 1975) is a Swedish pole vaulter.

He finished ninth at the 2002 European Athletics Championships, and competed at the 2004 IAAF World Indoor Championships without reaching the final.

His personal best is 5.87 metres, achieved in June 2003 in Somero. This was the Swedish record until April 1, 2017, when Armand Duplantis passed 5.90 metres.

== Competition record ==
| Year | Competition | Venue | Position | Notes |
Representing Sweden
| 1997 | Universiade | Catania, Italy | 10th | 5.30 m |
| 1999 | Universiade | Palma de Mallorca, Spain | 5th | 5.40 m |
| 2002 | European Championships | Munich, Germany | 9th (q) | 5.60 m |
| 2003 | World Indoor Championships | Birmingham, United Kingdom | – | NM |
| 2004 | World Indoor Championships | Budapest, Hungary | 13th (q) | 5.65 m |
