= Joao Andre =

Portuguese pole vaulter

Joao Andre (born 28 May 1976) is a former Portuguese pole vault athlete who competed in the 2000 Summer Olympics. He achieved a height of 5.40, not enough to qualify him for the second round. His personal high mark is 5.60.
