= Timothy Mack =

American pole vaulter (born 1972)

Personal information
- Born: September 15, 1972 (age 54) Cleveland, Ohio, United States
- Height: 6 ft 2 in (1.88 m)
- Weight: 178 lb (81 kg)
- Website: http://www.timmack.com

Sport
- Country: United States
- Sport: Athletics
- Event: Pole vault
- College team: Malone College; University of Tennessee
Medal record
Men's athletics
Representing the United States
Olympic Games
Gold medal – first place	2004 Athens	Pole vault
Goodwill Games
Gold medal – first place	2001 Brisbane	Pole vault

Timothy "Tim" Mack (born September 15, 1972) is an American pole vaulter who won the gold medal at the 2004 Olympics.

== Biography ==
Timothy Mack was born on September 15, 1972, in Cleveland, Ohio. He attended Saint Ignatius High School in Cleveland. He then attended Malone College and the University of Tennessee where he earned bachelor's and master's degrees. While at Tennessee, he was the 1995 SEC indoor pole vault champion clearing 5.50 meters. In the same year he won the NCAA Indoor title, clearing 5.60 meters. He finished 7th at the NCAA outdoor championships clearing 5.30 meters.

In 2000, Mack competed at the US Olympic Trials, finishing 8th with a vault of 5.53 meters. In 2001, he won the gold medal at the Goodwill Games in Brisbane, Australia, clearing 5.80 meters. Mack won the USA Indoor Track and Field Championships in 2002, clearing 5.70 meters. Later that year, he finished 2nd at the USA Outdoor Track and Field Championships with a vault of 5.74 meters. In 2003, Mack finished 3rd at both the US Indoor and Outdoor Championships, clearing 5.70 meters each time. At the 2004 US Indoor Championships, Mack finished 6th with a vault of 5.60 meters. At the US Olympic Trials later in the year, Mack won the pole vault with a vault of 5.90 meters, earning himself a spot on the US Olympic Team. At the Olympics, he won the gold medal, setting a new Olympic record with a vault of 5.95 meters. He also finished first at the 2nd IAAF World Athletics Final with a vault of 6.01 m, thereby joining the exclusive "6 meters club" of pole vaulters who reached 6 meters. In 2005, Mack tied for 7th at the US Outdoor Championships, clearing 5.40 meters. In 2006, he finished 4th at the US Indoor Championships and 7th at the US Outdoor Championships, clearing 5.50 meters at both meets.

In April, 2020, it was announced that he will be joining SPIRE Institute and Academy as a track & field training/development director.

== See also ==
- List of pole vaulters who reached 6 meters

Sporting positions
Preceded by (France) Romain Mesnil	Men's Pole Vault Best Year Performance; 2004	Succeeded by (Australia) Paul Burgess
