= Mikko Latvala =

Finnish pole vaulter (born 1980)

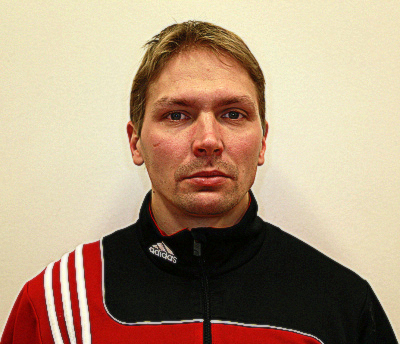

Personal information
- Full name: Mikko Tapio Latvala
- Nationality: Finland
- Born: 8 July 1980 (age 46) Vaasa, Finland
- Height: 1.82 m (5 ft 11 1/2 in)
- Weight: 82 kg (181 lb)

Sport
- Sport: Athletics
- Event: Pole vault
- Club: Haapajärven Kiilat (FIN)
- Coached by: Toni Latvala

Achievements and titles
- Personal best: Pole vault: 5.66 m (2001)

Mikko Tapio Latvala (born 8 July 1980 in Vaasa) is a Finnish pole vaulter. He won a silver medal for his category at the 2001 European Athletics Under-23 Championships in Amsterdam, Netherlands, with his best possible height of 5.50 metres. In 2007, Latvala suffered from multiple serious injuries, including a torn chest muscle as a result of a weightlifting accident in South Africa.

Latvala qualified for the 2008 Summer Olympics in Beijing, by successfully clearing a B-standard height of 5.63 metres from the Finnish Elite Games series in Lapua. He placed twenty-second in the first round of men's pole vault, with a best possible height of 5.45 metres, tying his overall position with Ukraine's Oleksandr Korchmid.

Latvala is also a full-time member of Haapajärven Kiilat, a local track and field club in Haapajärvi, and is coached and trained by his brother Toni.
