= Andrea Giannini =

Italian pole vaulter (born 1976)

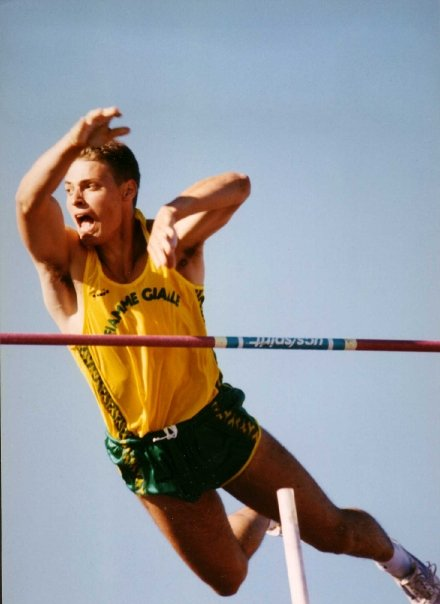

Personal information
- Nationality: Italian
- Born: 18 December 1976 (age 49) Grosseto, Italy
- Height: 1.87 m (6 ft 1 1/2 in)
- Weight: 80 kg (176 lb)

Sport
- Country: Italy
- Sport: Athletics
- Event: Pole vault
- Club: G.S. Fiamme Gialle

Achievements and titles
- Personal best: Pole vault: 5.65 m (1997)
Medal record
Mediterranean Games
| Gold medal – first place | 2001 Tunis | Pole Vault |
| Bronze medal – third place | 1997 Bari | Pole Vault |

Andrea Giannini (born 18 December 1976) is a retired Italian pole vaulter.

== Biography ==
He won the bronze medal at the 1997 Mediterranean Games, and the gold medal at the 2001 Mediterranean Games. He finished tenth at the 2003 Summer Universiade, and competed at the 1997 World Indoor Championships and the 1997 World Championships without reaching the final. He became Italian champion in 1997 (indoor) and 1998.

His personal best jump was 5.65 metres, achieved in July 1997 in Milan. After retirement, he became a sport journalist and athletics coach. He coaches the paralympic champion Oscar Pistorius during his trainings in Italy.

== National titles ==
He has won 2 times the individual national championship.

- 2 wins in the pole vault (1997 indoor and 1998 outdoor)

== See also ==
- Italian all-time lists -Pole vault
