= Andrei Tivontchik =

German pole vaulter

Personal information
- Native name: Андрэй Цівончык
- Nationality: German
- Born: 13 July 1970 (age 55) Gorkiy, Russian SFSR, Soviet Union
- Height: 1.85 m (6 ft 1 in)
- Weight: 78 kg (172 lb)

Sport
- Country: Belarus; Germany
- Sport: Athletics
- Event: Pole vault

Achievements and titles
- Personal best: 5.95 m (1996)
Medal record
Men's athletics
Representing Germany
Olympic Games
| Bronze medal – third place | 1996 Atlanta | Pole vault |

Andrei Tivontchik (Belarusian: Андрэй Цівончык; born 13 July 1970, in Gorkiy) is a former German pole vaulter. He was Olympic bronze medalist at the 1996 Summer Olympics in Atlanta.

Tivontchik grew up in the Soviet Union and became a Belarusian citizen after the Soviet dissolution. In 1993 he moved to Germany and became a German citizen. Beginning with the 1994 European Championships he started for the German team. Tivontchik could not take part in the 2000 Olympics and retired in 2001.

His personal best is 5.95 metres, achieved in 1996.

After working as trainer of the national pole vault team of Qatar, Tivontchik returned to Germany in 2004 where he is working as a trainer at LAZ Zweibrücken.

== See also ==
- Germany all-time top lists - Pole vault
