= Vasiliy Gorshkov =

Russian pole vaulter (born 1977)

Vasiliy Gorshkov (Russian: Василий Горшков; born 5 February 1977) is a Russian pole vaulter.

He finished eighth at the 2002 European Athletics Championships and fourth at the 2003 IAAF World Indoor Championships. He also competed at the 2001 World Championships in Athletics, but failed to qualify from his pool.

His personal best jump is 5.80 metres, achieved in July 2002 in Cheboksary. He has not competed on top level since 2004.
