= Adam Ptáček =

Czech pole vaulter (born 1980)

Personal information
- Born: 8 October 1980 (age 45) Ostrava, Czechoslovakia

Sport
- Country: Czech Republic
- Sport: Track and field
- Event: Pole vault
- Club: Dukla Praha
Medal record
Men's pole vault
Representing Czech Republic
World Athletics Indoor Championships
Silver medal – second place	2004 Budapest	Pole vault

Adam Ptáček (Czech pronunciation: [ˈadam ˈptaːtʃɛk]) (born 8 October 1980 in Ostrava) is a Czech former pole vaulter. His jump of 5.81 metres, set in February 2003, remains a national indoor record. He was the national record holder for outdoor pole vault after jumping 5.80 metres in July 2002, until the mark was beaten in 2015.

== Career ==
Ptáček won the bronze medal at the 1998 World Junior Championships in Annecy, France.

In July 2002, Ptáček registered a new personal best and a Czech record by jumping 5.80 metres in Prague. The height was four centimetres higher than the previous record, which he had jointly held with Štěpán Janáček. His outdoor mark of 5.80 metres remained the Czech record until June 2015. He finished sixth at August's 2002 European Championships in Munich with a clearance of 5.70 metres.

In February 2003, Ptáček jumped 5.81 metres indoors, a mark which set a new absolute national record lasting until Michal Balner beat it by one centimetre in June 2015. Ptáček competed at the 2003 World Indoor Championships in Birmingham and the 2003 World Championships in Paris without qualifying for the final stages.

He met the qualifying conditions for the 2004 Olympic Games after jumping 5.65 metres in Strahov in February 2004, a performance which also qualified him for that year's World Indoor Championships in March. Ptáček took silver at the 2004 World Indoor Championships after jumping 5.70 metres in Budapest, and won his country's second medal of the championships after high jumper Jaroslav Bába. At the Summer Olympics in Athens in August, Ptáček jumped 5.30 metres and 5.50 metres at the first attempt but was unable to record any more clearances, failing at 5.60 and 5.65 metres. He then withdrew from the competition due to a calf injury.

In June 2007, Ptáček jumped 5.82 metres in Prague in a city square contest, something which is not recognised by the IAAF. When attempting to jump 5.86 metres at the same event, he sustained an elbow injury and did not complete the jump.
