= Fabio Pizzolato =

Italian pole vaulter

Personal information
- Nationality: Italian
- Born: 16 March 1975 (age 51) Italy

Sport
- Country: Italy
- Sport: Athletics
- Event: Pole vault

Achievements and titles
- Personal bests: Pole vault outdoor: 5.75 (1997); Pole vault indoor: 5.70 (1998)

Fabio Pizzolato (born 16 March 1975) is a retired Italian pole vaulter.

== Biography ==
He finished ninth at the 2003 Summer Universiade, and competed at the 1997 World Indoor Championships, the 1997 World Championships and the 2002 European Championships without reaching the final. He became Italian champion in 1997 and 2003 and Italian indoor champion in 1998.

His personal best jump was 5.75 metres, achieved in July 1997 in Milan. He is the husband of the former pole vaulter Maria Carla Bresciani.

== National titles ==
Fabio Pizzolato has won 3 times the individual national championship.

- 2 wins in the pole vault (1997, 2003)
- 1 win in the pole vault indoor (1998)

== See also ==
- Italian all-time top lists - Pole vault
