= Giuseppe Gibilisco =

Italian pole vaulter and coach

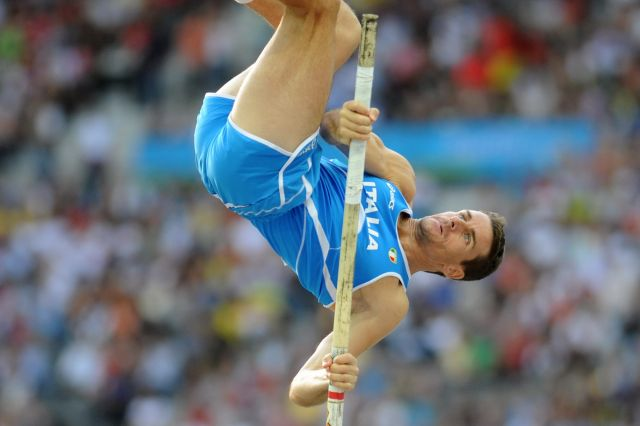

Personal information
- Nickname: Gibo
- National team: Italy
- Born: 5 January 1979 (age 47) Syracuse, Italy
- Height: 1.83 m (6 ft 0 in)
- Weight: 78 kg (172 lb)

Sport
- Sport: Athletics
- Event: Pole vault
- Club: G.S. Fiamme Gialle
- Coached by: Vitaly Petrov

Achievements and titles
- Personal best: Pole vault: 5.90 m (2003)
Medal record
Event	1st	2nd	3rd
Olympic Games	0	0	1
World Championships	1	0	0
Mediterranean Games	1	1	0
European Cup	1	4	1
World Athletics Final	0	0	1
World Military Championships	1	0	0
European U23 Championships	0	0	1
World Junior Championships	0	0	1
Total	4	5	5
Olympic Games
Bronze medal – third place	2004 Athens	Pole vault
World Championships
Gold medal – first place	2003 Paris	Pole vault
European Cup
Gold medal – first place	2005 Florence	Pole vault
Silver medal – second place	2002 Annecy	Pole vault
Silver medal – second place	2003 Florence	Pole vault
Silver medal – second place	2006 Málaga	Pole vault
Silver medal – second place	2013 Gateshead	Pole vault
Bronze medal – third place	2010 Bergen	Pole vault
Mediterranean Games
Gold medal – first place	2013 Mersin	Pole vault
Silver medal – second place	2001 Tunis	Pole vault

Giuseppe "Peppe" Gibilisco (Italian pronunciation: [dʒuˈzɛppe dʒibiˈlisko]; born 5 January 1979) is an Italian coach and former pole vaulter, who won the 2003 World Championships with a personal best of 5.90 m. He followed this with a bronze medal in the 2004 Olympics. He also competed in four-man bobsleigh in two race of the 2016–17 Bobsleigh World Cup finishing 25th and 28th.

He is the coach of the Italian pole vaulter Claudio Stecchi.

== Biography ==
Giuseppe Gibilisco was born in Syracuse, Sicily. He won twelve medals (ten of these at senior level), at the International athletics competitions. He has 28 caps in national team from 1998 to 2011. He participated in three Olympic Games and four world championships. In 2007, Gibilisco was suspended by the FIDAL (Italian Athletics Federation) with a two-year ban, due to his involvement in the "Oil for Drugs" case and his relation with suspect doctor Carlo Santuccione, although he had never tested positive, but two months after the Board of Appeals reverses the ruling and decide for acquittal.

In 2011, he could obtain 5.70 m, minimum qualification to the IAAF World Championships in Daegu, South Korea, but the IAAF did not approve because the result was obtained in an esibition event in a streets in Landau, Germany. In 2012 he jumped 5:52 m in Liévin, France indoor and, as a result of an injury, not disputing the outdoor season thus losing the possibility to participate in his fourth Olympics.

On 23 July 2013 he jumped 24 time 5.70 m outdoor, in Italy three other athletes were capable of doing so on six occasions: Fabio Pizzolato (only one jump at 5.75 m), Mauro Maurilio Mariani (three times 5.70 m) and Gianni Iapichino, former Fiona May husband (two times 5.70 m). In the indoor seasons he jumped other six times at least 5.70 m, one time in 2003 and 2010, and 4 times in 2004.

Gibilisco retired from pole vaulting in August 2014.

Since 2016, Gibilisco has represented Italy at international bobsleigh competitions. On 29 January 2017 he made his Bobsleigh World Cup debut at Königssee as a brakeman for the four-man team of veteran pilot Simone Bertazzo, finishing in 25th place.

== National records ==
- Pole vault: 5.90 m ( (France) Paris, 28 August 2003) - current holder
- Pole vault indoor: 5.82 m ( (Ukraine) Donetsk, 15 February 2004) - current holder

== Progression ==
=== Outdoor ===
He finished the season 9 times in world top 25 (5 outdoor, 4 indoor), in 2003 and 2004 he finished in fourth place outdoor, in 2004 he finished 2nd indoor.

Year	Measure	Venue	Date	World Rank
2013	5.70 m	(Turkey) Mersin	28-6-2013	12th
2011	5.55 m	(Italy) Florence	4-6-2011	47th
2010	5.75 m	(Spain) Barcelona	31-7-2010	13th
2009	5.70 m	(Italy) Formia	24-7-2009	31st
2008	5.65 m	(China) Beijing	20-8-2008	-
2007	5.70 m	(Greece) Athens	2-7-2007	-
2006	5.80 m	(Greece) Athens	3-7-2006	15th
2005	5.83 m	(Germany) Berlin	4-9-2005	9th
2004	5.85 m	(Greece) Athens	27-8-2004	4th
2003	5.90 m	(France) Paris	28-8-2003	4th
2002	5.70 m	(Greece) La Canea	30-6-2002	27th
2001	5.50 m	(Netherlands) Amsterdam	15-7-2001	-
2000	5.70 m	(Australia) Sydney	27-9-2000	-
2000	5.70 m	(Switzerland) Rüdlingen	12-8-2000	-
2000	5.70 m	(United Kingdom) Gateshead	16-7-2000	-
1999	5.60 m	(Germany) Cuxhaven	23-7-1999	-
1998	5.20 m	(France) Annecy	2-8-1998	-
1997	5.30 m	(Italy) Rieti	2-6-1997	-
1996	5.05 m	-	-	-

=== Indoor ===
Year	Measure	Venue	Date	World Rank
2013	5.60 m	(United Kingdom) Gateshead	23-6-2013	28th
2012	5.52 m	(France) Liévin	14-2-2012	40th
2011	5.50 m	(United Kingdom) Birmingham	19-2-2011	36th
2010	5.70 m	(Germany) Dessau	2-2-2010	16th
2009	5.50 m	(Italy) Turin	21-2-2009	49th
2007	5.45 m	(Germany) Karlsruhe	11-2-2007	
2006	5.60 m	(Germany) Stuttgart	4-2-2006	30th
2004	5.82 m	(Ukraine) Donetsk	15-2-2004	2nd
2003	5.71 m	(Ukraine) Donetsk	16-2-2003	14th
2002	5.60 m	(Germany) Zweibrücken	1-2-2002	28th
2001	5.60 m	(Ukraine) Donetsk	4-2-2001	29th
2000	5.62 m	(Germany) Cologne	6-2-2000	24th

== Achievements ==
Year	Competition	Venue	Position	Notes
Representing Italy
1998	World Junior Championships	(France) Annecy	3rd	5.20 m
1999	European U23 Championships	Gothenburg, Sweden	9th	5.30 m
2000	European Cup	(England) Gateshead	4th	5.70 m
2000	Summer Olympics	(Australia) Sydney	10th	5.50 m
2001	European U23 Championships	(Netherlands) Amsterdam	3rd	5.50 m
2001	Mediterranean Games	(Tunisia) Tunis	2nd	5.40
2001	World Championships	(Canada) Edmonton	23rd	NM
2002	European Cup	(France) Annecy	2nd	5.65
2002	European Championships	(Germany) Munich	10th	5.60
2002	World Military Championships	(Italy) Tivoili	1st	5.50
2003	World indoor Championships	(England) Birmingham	8th	5.40
2003	European Cup	(Italy) Florence	2nd	5.70
2003	World Championships	(France) Paris	1st	5.90
2003	World Athletics Final	(Monaco) Monte Carlo	6th	5.60
2004	Summer Olympics	(Greece) Athens	3rd	5.85
2004	World Athletics Final	(Monaco) Monte Carlo	6th	5.45
2005	European Cup	(Italy) Florence	1st	5.80
2005	World Championships	(Finland) Helsinki	5th	5.50
2005	World Athletics Final	(Monaco) Monte Carlo	3rd	5.60
2006	World indoor Championships	(Hungary) Budapest	10th	5.60
2006	European Cup	(Spain) Málaga	2nd	5.65
2006	European Championships	(Sweden) Gothenburg	7th	5.50
2008	Summer Olympics	(China) Beijing	11th	NM
2009	World Championships	(Germany) Berlin	7th	5.65
2010	World indoor Championships	(Qatar) Doha	Qual	5.45
2010	European Team Championships	(Norway) Bergen	3rd	5.60
2010	Athletissima	(Switzerland) Lausanne	6th	5.60
2010	European Championships	(Spain) Barcelona	4th	5.75
2013	European Team Championships	(United Kingdom) Gateshead	2nd	5.60
2013	Mediterranean Games	(Turkey) Mersin	1st	5.70

== National titles ==
He has won 3 times the individual national championship.

- 3 wins in the pole vault indoor (2001, 2002, 2004)

== See also ==
- List of Italian records in athletics
- List of Italian records in masters athletics
- Italian all-time lists - Pole vault
