= Paul Burgess (athlete) =

Australian pole vaulter

Personal information
- Born: 14 August 1979 (age 47) Perth, Australia

Gymnastics career
- Discipline: Men's artistic gymnastics
Medal record
Men's athletics
Commonwealth Games
Silver medal – second place	1998 Kuala Lumpur	Pole vault
Silver medal – second place	2002 Manchester	Pole vault

Paul Burgess (born 14 August 1979) is an Australian pole vaulter who became the thirteenth pole vaulter in the world to vault over 6 metres.

== Biography ==
Burgess was originally a gymnast, winning a silver medal at the Australian National Gymnastics Championships as a thirteen-year-old. Having grown too tall to continue with gymnastics, testing at the Western Australian Institute of Sport suggested that Burgess was suited to pole vault. By 1996, Burgess had won the gold medal at the 1996 Sydney World Junior Championships, clearing a then-personal best of 5.35 metres. Later that year, Burgess set the under-18 Australian record of 5.51 metres. In 1998, Burgess finished second at the 1998 Commonwealth Games, third at the World Junior Championships and seventh at the World Cup.

Burgess finished second at the East Asian Games in 2001, clearing 5.50 metres. In 2002, Burgess finished fifth at the World Cup, clearing 5.20 metres.

At his second Olympics in 2004, Burgess finished eleventh at 5.55 metres, although he had cleared 5.70 metres in the qualifying rounds.

It was, however, in 2005 that Burgess's form improved dramatically, clearing 5.91 metres, 5.95 metres and then 6.00 metres in domestic competition. These were, at the time, the three highest vaults on Australian soil.

Burgess ended the 2006 European season as the number two ranked pole vaulter (behind training partner Steven Hooker), having won the World Athletics Final on 10 September 2006. Burgess won US$30,000 in the process.

He was named Western Australian Sports Star of the Year in January 2006.

He later became a coach and spoke out on misconduct within the sport in Australia.

== See also ==
- 6 metres club

Sporting positions
Preceded by (United States) Timothy Mack	Men's Pole Vault Best Year Performance; 2005	Succeeded by (United States) Brad Walker
