= Pavel Gerasimov =

Russian pole vaulter (born 1979)

Medal record

Representing Russia

Men's athletics

World Championships
Bronze medal – third place	2005 Helsinki	Pole vault

European Indoor Championships
Silver medal – second place	2009 Torino	Pole Vault

Pavel Aleksandrovich Gerasimov (Russian: Павел Александрович Герасимов, b. May 29, 1979, Aleksin, Tula Oblast) is a Russian athlete competing in the pole vault.

The 1998 world junior champion, Gerasimov won his first senior medal, a bronze medal, at the 2005 World Championships. His personal best of 5.90 was achieved in August 2000.
