= Thibaut Duval =

Belgian pole vaulter

Personal information
- Born: 1 February 1979 (age 47)

Sport
- Sport: Track and field

Thibaut Duval (born 1 February 1979) is a Belgian pole vaulter.

Duval finished eighth at the 1998 World Junior Championships, fourth at the 2000 European Championships in Gent and fifth at the 2002 European Indoor Championships. He also competed at the World Championships in 1999 and 2003 as well as the 2000 Olympic Games, without reaching the final round.

His personal best jump is 5.70 metres, achieved in June 2000 in Oordegem and in Vienna in 2002, which at that time was the Belgian national record but has since been surpassed.
