= Patrik Klüft =

Swedish pole vaulter

Medal record

Men's athletics

World Championships
Bronze medal – third place	2003 Paris	Pole vault

European Indoor Championships
Silver medal – second place	2002 Vienna	Pole Vault

Arne Patrik Klüft (né Kristiansson; born 3 June 1977 in Gothenburg) is a Swedish pole vault athlete.

He made his breakthrough in 1998 when he set a new Swedish record with 5.77 metres. In 2001 he jumped 5.83 and the following year 5.85. One of his greatest success came at the 2003 World Championships in Paris where he equalled his personal best and won the bronze medal.

Other achievements include silver at the 2002 European Indoor Championships in Vienna, silver at the 1996 World Junior Championships in Sydney, three Swedish records, fourth place at the 2002 European Championships in Munich as well as 4 national championships (1998, 2001, 2002, 2003).

He is married to Carolina Klüft and the couple lives in Karlskrona. In May 2025, they filed for divorce.

== Personal bests ==
- Pole vault – 5.85 metres (23 August 2002, Finnkampen 2002, Helsinki)
