= 1992 European Athletics Indoor Championships – Men's pole vault =

The men's pole vault event at the 1992 European Athletics Indoor Championships was held in Palasport di Genova on 1 March.

== Results ==
Rank	Name	Nationality	Result	Notes
1st place, gold medalist(s)	Pyotr Bochkaryov	Unified Team	5.85	
2nd place, silver medalist(s)	István Bagyula	Hungary	5.80	
3rd place, bronze medalist(s)	Konstantin Semyonov	Unified Team	5.60	
4	Jean Galfione	France	5.60	
5	Gianni Iapichino	Italy	5.60	
5	Peter Widén	Sweden	5.60	
7	Hermann Fehringer	Austria	5.60	
8	Jani Lehtonen	Finland	5.60	
8	Nikolay Nikolov	Bulgaria	5.60	
10	Javier García	Spain	5.50	
11	Philippe Collet	France	5.40	
12	Andy Ashurst	Great Britain	5.40	
12	Massimo Allevi	Italy	5.40	
14	Gérald Baudouin	France	5.30	
15	Zdeněk Lubenský	Czechoslovakia	5.30	
15	Andrea Pegoraro	Italy	5.30	
17	Danny Krasnov	Israel	5.15	
18	Martin Voss	Denmark	5.15	
19	Markus Lübbers	Switzerland	5.00	
20	Sazan Fisheku	Albania	4.80	
	Werner Holl	Germany	NM	
	Zoltán Farkas	Hungary	NM	
	Delko Lesev	Bulgaria	NM	
	Valeri Bukrejev	Estonia	NM	
	Martin Amann	Germany	DNS	
