= 1993 IAAF World Indoor Championships – Men's pole vault =

The men's pole vault event at the 1993 IAAF World Indoor Championships was held on 12 and 13 March.

== Medalists ==
Gold	Silver	Bronze
Radion Gataullin; Russia	Grigoriy Yegorov; Kazakhstan	Jean Galfione; France

== Results ==
=== Qualification ===
Qualification: 5.60 (Q) or at least 12 best performers (q) qualified for the final.

Rank	Group	Name	Nationality	Result	Notes
1	A	Daniel Martí	Spain	5.50	q
1	A	Jani Lehtonen	Finland	5.50	q
3	A	Werner Holl	Germany	5.50	q
4	A	Tim McMichael	United States	5.50	q
4	A	Danny Krasnov	Israel	5.50	q, NR
6	A	Andrea Pegoraro	Italy	5.50	q
7	A	Edgardo Díaz	Puerto Rico	5.40	
8	A	Heikki Vääräniemi	Finland	5.30	
9	A	Laurens Looije	Netherlands	5.30	
10	A	Doug Wood	Canada	5.30	
1	B	Igor Trandenkov	Russia	5.50	q
1	B	Jean Galfione	France	5.50	q
1	B	Igor Potapovich	Kazakhstan	5.50	q
1	B	Greg West	United States	5.50	q
1	B	Grigoriy Yegorov	Kazakhstan	5.50	q
6	B	Radion Gataullin	Russia	5.50	q
6	B	Thierry Vigneron	France	5.50	q
8	B	Valeri Bukrejev	Estonia	5.50	q
9	B	Javier García	Spain	5.50	q
10	B	Simon Arkell	Australia	5.30	
11	B	Peter Widén	Sweden	5.30	

=== Final ===
Rank	Name	Nationality	Result	Notes
1st place, gold medalist(s)	Radion Gataullin	Russia	5.90	
2nd place, silver medalist(s)	Grigoriy Yegorov	Kazakhstan	5.80	
3rd place, bronze medalist(s)	Jean Galfione	France	5.80	
4	Igor Trandenkov	Russia	5.80	
5	Jani Lehtonen	Finland	5.65	
6	Werner Holl	Germany	5.65	
7	Andrea Pegoraro	Italy	5.65	NR
8	Greg West	United States	5.60	
9	Igor Potapovich	Kazakhstan	5.50	
10	Javier García	Spain	5.50	
10	Daniel Martí	Spain	5.50	
12	Tim McMichael	United States	5.40	
13	Danny Krasnov	Israel	5.40	
	Valeri Bukrejev	Estonia	NM	
	Thierry Vigneron	France	NM	
