= Athletics at the 1991 Summer Universiade – Men's pole vault =

The men's pole vault event at the 1991 Summer Universiade was held at the Don Valley Stadium in Sheffield on 20 and 21 July 1991.

== Medalists ==
Gold	Silver	Bronze
István Bagyula; Hungary	Bill Payne; United States	Pyotr Bochkaryov; Soviet Union

== Results ==
=== Qualification ===
Rank	Group	Athlete	Nationality	4.40	4.80	5.00	5.20	Result	Notes
?	?	Kai Atzbacher	Germany					5.20	Q
?	?	Igor Yanchevskiy	Soviet Union					5.20	Q
?	?	Doug Wood	Canada					5.20	Q
?	?	Kim Chul-kyun	South Korea					5.20	Q
?	?	Bill Payne	United States					5.20	Q
?	?	Marc Vandevoir	France					5.20	Q
?	?	Gianni Iapichino	Italy					5.20	Q
?	?	István Bagyula	Hungary					5.20	Q
?	?	Kelly Riley	United States					5.20	Q
?	?	Paul Just	Canada					5.20	Q
?	?	Antonio Colella	Italy					5.20	Q
?	?	Heikki Vääräniemi	Finland					5.20	Q
?	?	Pyotr Bochkaryov	Soviet Union					5.20	Q
?	?	Thierry Moyse	France					5.20	Q
?	?	Juha Rauhaniemi	Finland					5.20	Q
?	?	Simon Arkell	Australia					5.20	Q
17	?	Konstantin Zagustin	Venezuela					5.10	
18	?	Kersley Gardenne	Mauritius					5.00	
19	?	Nuno Fernandes	Portugal					5.00	
	?	Ian Tullett	Great Britain	–	xxx			NM	
	?	Matt Belsham	Great Britain	xxx				NM	

=== Final ===
Rank	Athlete	Nationality	5.00	5.20	5.40	5.50	5.60	5.70	5.80	5.93	Result	Notes
1st place, gold medalist(s)	István Bagyula	Hungary				xxo	o	o	xxo	xxx	5.80	UR
2nd place, silver medalist(s)	Bill Payne	United States									5.60	
3rd place, bronze medalist(s)	Pyotr Bochkaryov	Soviet Union									5.60	
4	Igor Yanchevskiy	Soviet Union									5.50	
5	Heikki Vääräniemi	Finland									5.40	
6	Kim Chul-kyun	South Korea									5.40	
7	Simon Arkell	Australia									5.40	
8	Gianni Iapichino	Italy									5.20	
8	Kai Atzbacher	Germany									5.20	
8	Marc Vandevoir	France									5.20	
11	Doug Wood	Canada									5.20	
12	Thierry Moyse	France									5.20	
13	Paul Just	Canada									5.00	
	Kelly Riley	United States	–	–	xxx						NM	
	Juha Rauhaniemi	Finland	–	xxx							NM	
	Antonio Colella	Italy	–	xxx							NM	
