= 1994 European Athletics Indoor Championships – Men's pole vault =

The men's pole vault event at the 1994 European Athletics Indoor Championships was held in Palais Omnisports de Paris-Bercy on 11 and 12 March.

== Medalists ==
Gold	Silver	Bronze
Pyotr Bochkaryov; Russia	Jean Galfione; France	Igor Trandenkov; Russia

== Results ==
=== Qualification ===
Qualification performance: 5.50 (Q) or at least 12 best performers (q) advanced to the final.

Rank	Athlete	Nationality	Result	Notes
1	Martin Amann	Germany	5.50	Q
1	István Bagyula	Hungary	5.50	Q
1	Gérald Baudouin	France	5.50	Q
1	Pyotr Bochkaryov	Russia	5.50	Q
1	Valeri Bukrejev	Estonia	5.50	Q
1	Philippe D'Encausse	France	5.50	Q
1	Jean Galfione	France	5.50	Q
1	Gianni Iapichino	Italy	5.50	Q
1	Danny Krasnov	Israel	5.50	Q
1	Jani Lehtonen	Finland	5.50	Q
1	Daniel Martí	Spain	5.50	Q
1	Denis Petushinskiy	Russia	5.50	Q
1	Igor Trandenkov	Russia	5.50	Q
1	Peter Widén	Sweden	5.50	Q
15	Andrea Pegoraro	Italy	5.40	
15	Patrik Stenlund	Sweden	5.40	
15	Mårten Ulvsbäck	Sweden	5.40	
15	Martin Voss	Denmark	5.40	
19	Aleksanders Matusevics	Latvia	5.20	
19	Michael Stolle	Germany	5.20	
21	Raynald Mury	Switzerland	5.00	
21	Alan De Naeyer	Belgium	5.00	
	Nuno Fernandes	Portugal	NM	
	Aleksandr Jucov	Moldova	NM	
	Tim Lobinger	Germany	NM	
	Domitien Mestré	Belgium	NM	

=== Final ===
Rank	Name	Nationality	5.20	5.40	5.50	5.60	5.65	5.70	5.75	5.80	5.85	5.90	5.95	Result	Notes
1st place, gold medalist(s)	Pyotr Bochkaryov	Russia	–	–	o	–	–	xo	–	xo	–	xo	–	5.90	CR
2nd place, silver medalist(s)	Jean Galfione	France	–	–	o	–	–	o	–	xo	–	xx–	x	5.80	
3rd place, bronze medalist(s)	Igor Trandenkov	Russia	–	–	–	o	–	–	o	xx–	x			5.75	
4	Denis Petushinskiy	Russia	–	–	–	xo	–	–	o	xx–	x			5.75	
5	István Bagyula	Hungary	–	xo	o	xo	–	xo	–	xxx				5.70	
6	Gianni Iapichino	Italy	–	o	–	o	–	xxx						5.60	
7	Danny Krasnov	Israel	–	o	xxo	o	–	xxx						5.60	NR
8	Valeri Bukrejev	Estonia	–	–	xxo	xo	–	xxx						5.60	NR
9	Gérald Baudouin	France	–	xo	–	xxo	–	xxx						5.60	
10	Daniel Martí	Spain	o	–	xxx									5.20	
	Philippe D'Encausse	France	–	–	xxx									NM	
	Peter Widén	Sweden	–	xxx										NM	
	Jani Lehtonen	Finland	–	–	–	xx–	x							NM	
	Martin Amann	Germany												DNS	
