= 1993 World Championships in Athletics – Men's pole vault =

These are the official results of the Men's Pole Vault event at the 1993 IAAF World Championships in Stuttgart, Germany. There were a total of 45 participating athletes, with two qualifying groups (the qualification mark was set at 5.70m). The final was held on Thursday August 19, 1993.

== Medalists ==
Gold	Sergey Bubka; Ukraine (UKR)
Silver	Grigoriy Yegorov; Kazakhstan (KAZ)
Bronze	Maksim Tarasov; Russia (RUS)
Bronze	Igor Trandenkov; Russia (RUS)

== Schedule ==
- All times are Central European Time (UTC+1)

Qualification Round
Group A	Group B
17.08.1993 – 16:40h	17.08.1993 – 16:40h
Final Round
19.08.1993 – 17:00h

== Abbreviations ==
- All results shown are in metres

Q	automatic qualification
q	qualification by rank
DNS	did not start
NM	no mark
WR	world record
AR	area record
NR	national record
PB	personal best
SB	season best

== Results ==
=== Qualifying round ===
- Held on Tuesday 1993-08-17

Qualification: Qualifying Performance 5.75 (Q) or at least 12 best performers (q) advance to the final.

Rank	Group	Name	Nationality	4.45	4.85	5.05	5.15	5.25	5.35	5.45	5.55	5.65	5.75	Result	Notes
1	A	Grigoriy Yegorov	Kazakhstan											5.75	Q
2	A	Denis Petushinskiy	Russia											5.75	Q
3	A	Sergey Bubka	Ukraine	–	–	–	–	–	–	–	–	o	–	5.65	q
3	A	Igor Trandenkov	Russia											5.65	q
3	A	Mårten Ulvsbäck	Sweden											5.65	q
6	A	Mike Holloway	United States											5.65	
7	A	Andrea Pegoraro	Italy											5.65	
7	A	Okkert Brits	South Africa											5.65	
9	A	Dean Starkey	United States											5.55	
10	A	Jani Lehtonen	Finland											5.55	
11	A	Patrik Stenlund	Sweden											5.55	
12	A	Javier García	Spain											5.45	
13	A	Paul Benavides	Mexico											5.45	
13	A	Aleksandr Zhukov	Moldova											5.45	
15	A	Philippe d'Encausse	France											5.45	
16	A	Tim Lobinger	Germany											5.35	
17	A	Gennadiy Sukharev	Belarus											5.35	
18	A	Werner Holl	Germany											5.25	
19	A	Toshiyuki Hashioka	Japan											5.25	
20	A	Doug Wood	Canada											5.15	
21	A	Raynald Mury	Switzerland											5.15	
22	A	Demingo Kapal	Brunei											4.45	
	A	Aleksandr Korchagin	Kazakhstan											NM	
1	B	Jean Galfione	France											5.75	Q
2	B	Daniel Martí	Spain											5.65	q
2	B	Maksim Tarasov	Russia											5.65	q
2	B	Valeri Bukrejev	Estonia											5.65	q
2	B	István Bagyula	Hungary											5.65	q
2	B	Vasiliy Bubka	Ukraine											5.65	q
2	B	Scott Huffman	United States											5.65	q
8	B	Peter Widén	Sweden											5.65	q
9	B	Igor Potapovich	Kazakhstan											5.65	
10	B	Danny Krasnov	Israel											5.55	
10	B	Martin Amann	Germany											5.55	
12	B	Gerald Baudouin	France											5.45	
13	B	Simon Arkell	Australia											5.45	
13	B	Heikki Vaaraniemi	Finland											5.45	
15	B	Martin Voss	Denmark											5.45	
16	B	Mike Edwards	Great Britain	–	–	–	–	o	xxo	xo	xxx			5.45	
17	B	Delko Lesev	Bulgaria											5.25	
18	B	Stavros Tsitouras	Greece											5.25	
19	B	Nuno Fernandes	Portugal											5.25	
19	B	Zdeněk Lubenský	Czech Republic											5.25	
	B	Petri Peltoniemi	Finland											NM	
	B	José Manuel Arcos	Spain											NM	

=== Final ===
Rank	Name	Nationality	5.00	5.20	5.40	5.50	5.60	5.70	5.75	5.80	5.85	5.90	5.95	6.00	6.14	Result	Notes
1st place, gold medalist(s)	Sergey Bubka	Ukraine	–	–	–	–	–	o	–	–	–	o	–	o	xxx	6.00	CR
2nd place, silver medalist(s)	Grigoriy Yegorov	Kazakhstan	–	–	–	–	o	–	o	–	o	o	–	xxx		5.90	PB
3rd place, bronze medalist(s)	Maksim Tarasov	Russia	–	–	–	–	o	–	–	o	–	xxx				5.80	
3rd place, bronze medalist(s)	Igor Trandenkov	Russia	–	–	–	–	o	–	–	o	–	xx–	x			5.80	
5	Scott Huffman	United States	–	–	–	o	–	xo	–	o	xxx					5.80	
6	Denis Petushinskiy	Russia	–	–	–	–	o	xxo	–	xo	xxx					5.80	
7	Valeri Bukrejev	Estonia	–	–	–	–	o	–	xo	–	xxx					5.75	
8	Jean Galfione	France														5.70	
9	Vasiliy Bubka	Ukraine														5.70	
10	István Bagyula	Hungary														5.70	
11	Peter Widén	Sweden														5.60	
	Mårten Ulvsbäck	Sweden														NM	
	Daniel Martí	Spain														NM	

== See also ==
- 1988 Men's Olympic Pole Vault (Seoul)
- 1990 Men's European Championships Pole Vault (Split)
- 1992 Men's Olympic Pole Vault (Barcelona)
- 1994 Men's European Championships Pole Vault (Helsinki)
