= 1992 in the sport of athletics =

1992 in athletics
- Major world events: Olympic Games

This article contains an overview of the year 1992 in athletics.

== International events ==
- African Championships
- Balkan Games
- European Indoor Championships
- Olympic Games
- Pan Arab Games
- World Cross Country Championships
- World Junior Championships

== World records ==
=== Men ===
EVENT	ATHLETE	MARK	DATE	VENUE
1500 metres	Noureddine Morceli (ALG)	3:28.86	6 September	Rieti, Italy
3,000 metres	Moses Kiptanui (KEN)	7:28.96	16 August	Köln, Germany
400 m hurdles	Kevin Young (USA)	46.78	6 August	Barcelona, Spain
3000 m steeplechase	Moses Kiptanui (KEN)	8:02.08	19 August	Zürich, Switzerland
4 × 100 m Relay	United States (USA) • Michael Marsh • Leroy Burrell • Dennis Mitchell • Carl Lewis	37.40	8 August	Barcelona
4 × 200 m Relay	Santa Monica United States (USA) • Michael Marsh • Leroy Burrell • Floyd Heard • Carl Lewis	1:19.11	25 April	Philadelphia
4 × 400 m Relay	United States (USA) • Andrew Valmon • Quincy Watts • Michael Johnson • Steve Lewis	2:55.74	8 August	Barcelona
Pole vault	Sergey Bubka (UKR)	6.11m	13 June	Dijon, France
Pole vault	Sergey Bubka (UKR)	6.12m	30 August	Padua, Italy
Pole vault	Sergey Bubka (UKR)	6.13m	19 September	Tokyo, Japan
Javelin (new)	Steve Backley (GBR)	91.46m	25 January	North Shore, New Zealand
Decathlon	Dan O'Brien (USA)	8891	4-5 September	Talence, France

=== Women ===
EVENT	ATHLETE	MARK	DATE	VENUE
Pole vault	Sun Caiyun (CHN)	4.05m	21 May	Nanjing, China

== Men's best year performers ==
=== 100 metres ===
RANK	1992 WORLD BEST PERFORMERS	TIME
1.	Michael Marsh (USA)	9.93
2.	Davidson Ezinwa (NGR)	9.96
2.	Linford Christie (GBR)	9.96
4.	Olapade Adeniken (NGR)	9.97
4.	Leroy Burrell (USA)	9.97

=== 200 metres ===
RANK	1992 WORLD BEST PERFORMERS	TIME
1.	Michael Marsh (USA)	19.73
2.	Michael Johnson (USA)	19.79
3.	Frank Fredericks (NAM)	19.97
4.	Mike Bates (USA)	20.01
5.	John Regis (GBR)	20.09

=== 400 metres ===
RANK	1992 WORLD BEST PERFORMERS	TIME
1.	Quincy Watts (USA)	43.50
2.	Danny Everett (USA)	43.81
3.	Michael Johnson (USA)	43.98
4.	Steve Lewis (USA)	44.08
5.	Samson Kitur (KEN)	44.18

=== 800 metres ===
RANK	1992 WORLD BEST PERFORMERS	TIME
1.	Johnny Gray (USA)	1:42.80
2.	Nixon Kiprotich (KEN)	1:43.31
3.	William Tanui (KEN)	1:43.37
4.	Mark Everett (USA)	1:43.40
5.	Andrea Benvenuti (ITA)	1:43.92

=== 1,500 metres ===
RANK	1992 WORLD BEST PERFORMERS	TIME
1.	Noureddine Morceli (ALG)	3:28.86
2.	David Kibet (KEN)	3:32.13
3.	William Kemei (KEN)	3:32.41
4.	Wilfred Kirochi (KEN)	3:33.49
5.	Fermín Cacho (ESP)	3:32.69

=== Mile ===
RANK	1992 WORLD BEST PERFORMERS	TIME
1.	William Kemei (KEN)	3:48.80
2.	Noureddine Morceli (ALG)	3:49.79
3.	Dieter Baumann (GER)	3:51.12
4.	Gennaro di Napoli (ITA)	3:51.96
5.	David Kibet (KEN)	3:52.32

=== 3,000 metres ===
RANK	1992 WORLD BEST PERFORMERS	TIME
1.	Moses Kiptanui (KEN)	7:28.96
2.	Paul Bitok (KEN)	7:33.28
3.	Yobes Ondieki (KEN)	7:34.18
4.	Dieter Baumann (FRG)	7:38.10
5.	William Sigei (KEN)	7:39.51

=== 5,000 metres ===
RANK	1992 WORLD BEST PERFORMERS	TIME
1.	Moses Kiptanui (KEN)	13:00.93
2.	Yobes Ondieki (KEN)	13:03.58
3.	Paul Bitok (KEN)	13:08.89
4.	Dieter Baumann (FRG)	13:09.03
5.	Khalid Skah (MAR)	13:09.10

=== 10,000 metres ===
RANK	1992 WORLD BEST PERFORMERS	TIME
1.	Fita Bayissa (ETH)	27:14.26
2.	Richard Chelimo (KEN)	27:15.53
3.	António Martins (FRA)	27:22.78
4.	Arturo Barrios (MEX)	27:34.60
5.	Joseph Keino (KEN)	27:35.77

=== Half Marathon ===
RANK	1992 WORLD BEST PERFORMERS	TIME
1.	Benson Masya (KEN)	1:00:24

=== Marathon ===
RANK	1992 WORLD BEST PERFORMERS	TIME
1.	David Tsebe (RSA)	2:08:07
2.	Ibrahim Hussein (KEN)	2:08:14
3.	Dionicio Cerón (MEX)	2:08:36
4.	Manuel Matias (POR)	2:08:38
5.	Hwang Young-Cho (KOR)	2:08:47

=== 110m hurdles ===
RANK	1992 WORLD BEST PERFORMERS	TIME
1.	Colin Jackson (GBR)	13.04
2.	Tony Dees (USA)	13.08
3.	Mark McKoy (CAN)	13.11
4.	Florian Schwarthoff (GER)	13.13
4.	Jack Pierce (USA)	13.13

=== 400m hurdles ===
RANK	1992 WORLD BEST PERFORMERS	TIME
1.	Kevin Young (USA)	46.78
2.	Winthrop Graham (JAM)	47.62
3.	Kriss Akabusi (GBR)	47.82
4.	Samuel Matete (ZAM)	47.91
5.	David Patrick (USA)	48.01

=== 3,000m steeplechase ===
RANK	1992 WORLD BEST PERFORMERS	TIME
1.	Moses Kiptanui (KEN)	8:02.08
2.	Philip Barkutwo (KEN)	8:05.37
3.	Matthew Birir (KEN)	8:08.84
4.	Patrick Sang (KEN)	8:09.55
5.	William Mutwol (KEN)	8:10.74

=== High jump ===
RANK	1992 WORLD BEST PERFORMERS	HEIGHT
1.	Steve Smith (GBR)	2.37
2.	Lambros Papakostas (GRE)	2.36
2.	Javier Sotomayor (CUB)	2.36
4.	Hollis Conway (USA)	2.35
4.	Darrin Plab (USA)	2.35
4.	Dragutin Topić (YUG)	2.35

=== Long jump ===
RANK	1992 WORLD BEST PERFORMERS	DISTANCE
1.	Carl Lewis (USA)	8.68
2.	Mike Powell (USA)	8.64
3.	Iván Pedroso (CUB)	8.53
4.	Erick Walder (USA)	8.47
5.	Llewellyn Starks (USA)	8.40

=== Triple jump ===
RANK	1992 WORLD BEST PERFORMERS	DISTANCE
1.	Mike Conley (USA)	17.72
2.	Charles Simpkins (USA)	17.60
3.	Denis Kapustin (RUS)	17.48
4.	Frank Rutherford (BAH)	17.41
5.	Leonid Voloshin (RUS)	17.36

=== Discus ===
RANK	1992 WORLD BEST PERFORMERS	DISTANCE
1.	Jürgen Schult (GER)	69.04
2.	Lars Riedel (GER)	68.66
3.	Romas Ubartas (LTU)	68.18
4.	Anthony Washington (USA)	67.88
5.	Dmitriy Shevchenko (RUS)	67.30

=== Shot put ===
RANK	1992 WORLD BEST PERFORMERS	DISTANCE
1.	Gregg Tafralis (USA)	21.98
2.	Werner Günthör (SUI)	21.91
3.	Mike Stulce (USA)	21.70
4.	Jim Doehring (USA)	21.60
5.	Aleksandr Bagach (UKR)	21.19

=== Hammer ===
RANK	1992 WORLD BEST PERFORMERS	DISTANCE
1.	Igor Astapkovich (BLR)	84.62
2.	Igor Nikulin (RUS)	83.44
3.	Vasiliy Sidorenko (RUS)	82.54
3.	Andrey Abduvaliyev (UZB)	82.54
5.	Yuriy Syedikh (RUS)	82.18

=== Javelin (new design) ===
RANK	1992 WORLD BEST PERFORMERS	DISTANCE
1.	Steve Backley (GBR)	91.46
2.	Seppo Räty (FIN)	90.60
3.	Jan Železný (CZE)	90.18
4.	Juha Laukkanen (FIN)	88.22
5.	Tom Petranoff (USA)	87.26

=== Pole vault ===
RANK	1992 WORLD BEST PERFORMERS	HEIGHT
1.	Sergey Bubka (UKR)	6.13
2.	Rodion Gataullin (RUS)	5.95
3.	Igor Potapovich (KAZ)	5.92
4.	Dean Starkey (USA)	5.91
5.	Maksim Tarasov (RUS)	5.90
5.	Jean Galfione (FRA)	5.90
5.	Igor Trandenkov (RUS)	5.90

=== Decathlon ===
RANK	1992 WORLD BEST PERFORMERS	POINTS
1.	Dan O'Brien (USA)	8891
2.	Dave Johnson (USA)	8649
3.	Robert Změlík (TCH)	8627
4.	Antonio Peñalver (ESP)	8412
5.	Michael Smith (CAN)	8409

== Women's best year performers ==
=== 60 metres ===
RANK	1992 WORLD BEST PERFORMERS	TIME
1.	Merlene Ottey (JAM)	6.96
2.	Irina Privalova (RUS)	6.97
3.	Michelle Finn (USA)	7.07
4.	Juliet Cuthbert (JAM)	7.09
5.	Katrin Krabbe (GER)	7.10

=== 100 metres ===
RANK	1992 WORLD BEST PERFORMERS	TIME
1.	Merlene Ottey (JAM)	10.80
2.	Irina Privalova (RUS)	10.82
2.	Gail Devers (USA)	10.82
4.	Juliet Cuthbert (JAM)	10.83
5.	Gwen Torrence (USA)	10.86

=== 200 metres ===
RANK	1992 WORLD BEST PERFORMERS	TIME
1.	Gwen Torrence (USA)	21.72
2.	Juliet Cuthbert (JAM)	21.75
3.	Irina Privalova (RUS)	21.93
4.	Merlene Ottey (JAM)	21.94
5.	Marie-José Pérec (FRA)	22.20

=== 400 metres ===
RANK	1992 WORLD BEST PERFORMERS	TIME
1.	Marie-José Pérec (FRA)	48.83
2.	Olga Bryzgina (UKR)	49.07
3.	Gwen Torrence (USA)	49.64
3.	Ximena Restrepo (COL)	49.64
5.	Olga Nazarova (RUS)	49.69

=== 800 metres ===
RANK	1992 WORLD BEST PERFORMERS	TIME
1.	Ellen van Langen (NED)	1:55.54
2.	Lilia Nurutdinova (RUS)	1:55.99
3.	Ana Fidelia Quirot (CUB)	1:56.80
4.	Ella Kovacs (ROM)	1:57.19
5.	Inna Yevseyeva (UKR)	1:57.20

=== 1,500 metres ===
RANK	1992 WORLD BEST PERFORMERS	TIME
1.	Hassiba Boulmerka (ALG)	3:55.30
2.	Lyudmila Rogachova (RUS)	3:56.91
3.	Qu Yunxia (CHN)	3:57.08
4.	Tatyana Dorovskikh (UKR)	3:57.92
5.	Lyubov Kremlyova (RUS)	3:58.71

=== Mile ===
RANK	1992 WORLD BEST PERFORMERS	TIME
1.	Lyudmila Rogachova (RUS)	4:21.30
2.	Doina Melinte (ROM)	4:21.74
3.	Sonia O'Sullivan (IRL)	4:24.27
4.	Lyubov Kremlyova (RUS)	4:24.50
5.	Angela Chalmers (CAN)	4:25.08

=== 3,000 metres ===
RANK	1992 WORLD BEST PERFORMERS	TIME
1.	Yelena Romanova (RUS)	8:33.72
2.	Yvonne Murray (GBR)	8:36.63
3.	Sonia O'Sullivan (IRL)	8:37.92
4.	Elana Meyer (RSA)	8:38.45
5.	Margareta Keszeg (ROM)	8:39.64

=== 5,000 metres ===
RANK	1992 WORLD BEST PERFORMERS	TIME
1.	Elana Meyer (RSA)	14:44.15
2.	Sonia O'Sullivan (IRL)	14:59.11
3.	Liz McColgan (GBR)	15:01.86
4.	Christien Toonstra (NED)	15:07.68
5.	Esther Kiplagat (KEN)	15:07.87

=== 10,000 metres ===
RANK	1992 WORLD BEST PERFORMERS	TIME
1.	Derartu Tulu (ETH)	31:06.02
2.	Lisa Ondieki (AUS)	31:11.72
3.	Elana Meyer (RSA)	31:11.75
4.	Maria Conceição Ferreira (POR)	31:16.42
5.	Lynn Jennings (USA)	31:19.89

=== Half marathon ===
RANK	1992 WORLD BEST PERFORMERS	TIME
1.	Liz McColgan (GBR)	1:08:42

=== Marathon ===
RANK	1992 WORLD BEST PERFORMERS	TIME
1.	Olga Markova (RUS)	2:23:43
2.	Lisa Ondieki (AUS)	2:24:40
3.	Madina Biktagirova (BLR)	2:26:23
4.	Yumi Kokamo (JPN)	2:26:26
4.	Yoshiko Yamamoto (JPN)	2:26:26

=== 60m hurdles ===
RANK	1992 WORLD BEST PERFORMERS	TIME
1.	Ludmila Narozhilenko (RUS)	7.76
2.	Gail Devers (USA)	7.93
3.	Lidiya Yurkova (BLR)	7.94
4.	Julie Baumann (SWI)	7.95
4.	Monique Éwanjé-Épée (FRA)	7.95
4.	Nataliya Grygoryeva (UKR)	7.95

=== 100m hurdles ===
RANK	1992 WORLD BEST PERFORMERS	TIME
1.	Ludmila Narozhilenko (RUS)	12.26
2.	Gail Devers (USA)	12.55
3.	Nataliya Grygoryeva (UKR)	12.60
4.	Paraskevi Patoulidou (GRE)	12.64
5.	Yordanka Donkova (BUL)	12.67

=== 400m hurdles ===
RANK	1992 WORLD BEST PERFORMERS	TIME
1.	Sally Gunnell (GBR)	53.23
2.	Tatyana Ledovskaya (BLR)	53.55
3.	Sandra Farmer-Patrick (USA)	53.59
4.	Margarita Ponomaryova (RUS)	53.66
5.	Janeene Vickers (USA)	54.31

=== High jump ===
RANK	1992 WORLD BEST PERFORMERS	HEIGHT
1.	Stefka Kostadinova (BUL)	2.05 m
2.	Heike Henkel (GER)	2.04 m
3.	Inga Babakova (UKR)	2.00 m
3.	Alina Astafei (ROM)	2.00 m
5.	Ioamnet Quintero (CUB)	1.98 m

=== Long jump ===
RANK	1992 WORLD BEST PERFORMERS	DISTANCE
1.	Heike Drechsler (GER)	7.48 m
2.	Inessa Kravets (UKR)	7.37 m
3.	Jackie Joyner-Kersee (USA)	7.17 m
4.	Mirela Dulgheru (ROM)	7.14 m
5.	Chioma Ajunwa (NGR)	7.06 m

=== Triple jump ===
RANK	1992 WORLD BEST PERFORMERS	DISTANCE
1.	Galina Chistyakova (RUS)	14.62 m
2.	Li Huirong (CHN)	14.55 m
3.	Inessa Kravets (UKR)	14.41 m

=== Shot put ===
RANK	1992 WORLD BEST PERFORMERS	DISTANCE
1.	Svetlana Krivelyova (RUS)	21.06 m
2.	Belsis Laza (CUB)	20.96 m
3.	Krystyna Zabawska (POL)	19.42 m
4.	Zhou Shuqin (CHN)	19.40 m
5.	Tatyana Khorkhulyova (BLR)	19.28 m

=== Javelin (old design) ===
RANK	1992 WORLD BEST PERFORMERS	DISTANCE
1.	Natalya Shikolenko (BLR)	70.36
2.	Karen Forkel (GER)	69.58
3.	Trine Hattestad (NOR)	69.50
4.	Silke Renk (GER)	68.34
5.	Teresė Nekrošaitė (LTU)	67.64

=== Heptathlon ===
RANK	1992 WORLD BEST PERFORMERS	POINTS
1.	Jackie Joyner-Kersee (USA)	7044
2.	Sabine Braun (GER)	6985
3.	Irina Belova (RUS)	6845
4.	Svetla Dimitrova (BUL)	6658
5.	Liliana Nastase (ROM)	6619

== Births ==
- June 1, Gianmarco Tamberi, Italian athlete
- June 28, Elaine Thompson-Herah, Jamaican athlete
- August 27 Daniel Ståhl Swedish athlete

== Deaths ==
- March 1 — Howard Payne (60), English hammer thrower (b. 1931)
- July 7 — Josy Barthel (65), Luxembourgish runner (b. 1927)
- August 19 — Karl Storch (77), German hammer thrower (b. 1913)
- October 29 — Bill McChesney, Jr. (33), American long-distance runner (b. 1959)
