= 1990 European Athletics Indoor Championships – Men's pole vault =

The men's pole vault event at the 1990 European Athletics Indoor Championships was held in Kelvin Hall on 4 March.

== Results ==
Rank	Name	Nationality	4.80	5.00	5.10	5.20	5.30	5.40	5.50	5.60	5.70	5.75	5.80	5.85	5.90	Result	Notes
1st place, gold medalist(s)	Rodion Gataullin	Soviet Union	–	–	–	–	–	–	–	–	o	–	xo	–	xxx	5.80	
2nd place, silver medalist(s)	Grigoriy Yegorov	Soviet Union	–	–	–	–	–	–	–	o	–	xxo	–	xxx		5.75	
3rd place, bronze medalist(s)	Thierry Vigneron	France	–	–	–	–	–	–	o	–	xo					5.70	
3rd place, bronze medalist(s)	Hermann Fehringer	Austria														5.70	
5	István Bagyula	Hungary														5.60	
6	Nikolay Nikolov	Bulgaria														5.60	
6	Javier García	Spain	–	–	–	–	o	–	xo	xxo	xxx					5.60	
8	Philippe d'Encausse	France														5.40	
9	Asko Peltoniemi	Finland	–	–	–	–	–	xxo	xxx							5.40	
10	Andrea Pegoraro	Italy														5.20	
10	Andy Ashurst	Great Britain														5.20	
12	Ignacio Paradinas	Spain														5.20	
13	Galin Nikov	Bulgaria														5.20	
14	Gianni Iapichino	Italy														5.20	
	Delko Lesev	Bulgaria														NM	
	Peter Widén	Sweden														NM	
	Philippe Collet	France														NM	
