= 1994 European Athletics Championships – Men's pole vault =

Men's pole vault at the European Athletics Championships

These are the official results of the Men's Pole Vault event at the 1994 European Championships in Helsinki, Finland, held at Helsinki Olympic Stadium on 9 and 11 August 1994. There were 27 participating athletes, with two qualifying groups.

== Results ==
=== Qualification ===
Held on 9 August 1994
Qualification: 5.65 metres (Q) or at least 12 best athletes advance to the final

Rank	Group	Athlete	Nationality	5.20	5.30	5.40	5.50	5.60	Result	Notes
1	A	Petri Peltoniemi	Finland						5.60	q
1	A	Denis Petushinskiy	Russia						5.60	q
1	A	Danny Krasnov	Israel						5.60	q
1	A	Gérald Baudouin	France						5.60	q
5	A	Rodion Gataullin	Russia						5.60	q
6	A	Gianni Iapichino	Italy						5.60	q
7	A	Valeri Bukrejev	Estonia						5.60	q
8	A	Peter Widén	Sweden						5.50	q
9	A	Trond Barthel	Norway						5.50	
10	A	Daniel Martí	Spain						5.40	
10	A	Heikki Vääräniemi	Finland						5.40	
12	A	Tim Lobinger	Germany						5.40	
	A	Martin Amann	Germany						NM	
1	B	Igor Trandenkov	Russia						5.60	q
2	B	István Bagyula	Hungary						5.60	q
2	B	Jean Galfione	France						5.60	q
4	B	Philippe Collet	France						5.60	q
5	B	Andrei Tivontchik	Germany						5.50	q
6	B	Jani Lehtonen	Finland						5.50	
7	B	Gennadiy Sidorov	Belarus						5.40	
7	B	Nuno Fernandes	Portugal						5.40	
7	B	Martin Voss	Denmark						5.40	
10	B	Javier García	Spain						5.40	
11	B	Patrik Stenlund	Sweden						5.30	
12	B	Mike Edwards	Great Britain						5.20	
12	B	Aleksandrs Matusevičs	Latvia						5.20	
	B	Photis Stephani	Cyprus						NM	

=== Final ===
Held on 11 August 1994

Rank	Athlete	Nationality	5.20	5.40	5.60	5.70	5.80	5.85	5.90	5.95	6.00	Result	Notes
1st place, gold medalist(s)	Rodion Gataullin	Russia	–	–	–	xo	–	xo	xo	–	xo	6.00	
2nd place, silver medalist(s)	Igor Trandenkov	Russia	–	–	o	–	xo	–	o	–	xxx	5.90	
3rd place, bronze medalist(s)	Jean Galfione	France	–	–	o	–	o	o	x–	xx		5.85	
4	Philippe Collet	France	–	–	xo	o	o	xxx				5.80	
5	Denis Petushinskiy	Russia	–	–	xo	o	xo					5.80	
6	Andrei Tivontchik	Germany										5.70	
7	Danny Krasnov	Israel	–	–	xxo	o	x					5.70	NR
8	Valeri Bukrejev	Estonia										5.70	
8	Gianni Iapichino	Italy	–	o	xo	xo	xx					5.70	NR=
10	István Bagyula	Hungary										5.60	
11	Gérald Baudouin	France	–	o	o	xxx						5.60	
12	Petri Peltoniemi	Finland										5.60	
13	Peter Widén	Sweden										5.40	

== Participation ==
According to an unofficial count, 27 athletes from 17 countries participated in the event.

- Belarus (1)
- Cyprus (1)
- Denmark (1)
- Estonia (1)
- Finland (3)
- France (3)
- Germany (3)
- Hungary (1)
- Israel (1)
- Italy (1)
- Latvia (1)
- Norway (1)
- Portugal (1)
- Russia (3)
- Spain (2)
- Sweden (2)
- United Kingdom (1)

== See also ==
- 1990 Men's European Championships Pole Vault (Split)
- 1991 Men's World Championships Pole Vault (Tokyo)
- 1992 Men's Olympic Pole Vault (Barcelona)
- 1993 Men's World Championships Pole Vault (Stuttgart)
- 1995 Men's World Championships Pole Vault (Gothenburg)
- 1996 Men's Olympic Pole Vault (Atlanta)
- 1997 Men's World Championships Pole Vault (Athens)
- 1998 Men's European Championships Pole Vault (Budapest)
