= 1998 European Athletics Indoor Championships – Men's pole vault =

The men's pole vault event at the 1998 European Athletics Indoor Championships was held on 27 February–1 March.

== Medalists ==
Gold	Silver	Bronze
Tim Lobinger; Germany	Michael Stolle; Germany	Danny Ecker; Germany

== Results ==
=== Qualification ===
Qualification Performance: 5.65 (Q) or at least 12 best performers (q) advanced to the final.

Rank	Group	Athlete	Nationality	5.00	5.20	5.40	5.55	5.65	Result	Notes
1	A	Gérald Baudouin	France	–	o	o	o	o	5.65	Q
1	A	Jean Galfione	France	–	–	–	o	o	5.65	Q
3	B	Tim Lobinger	Germany	–	–	o	xo	o	5.65	Q
3	B	Romain Mesnil	France	–	–	o	xo	o	5.65	Q
3	B	Pyotr Bochkaryov	Russia	–	–	xo	o	o	5.65	Q
6	A	Danny Ecker	Germany	–	–	xxo	xo	o	5.65	Q
7	B	Michael Stolle	Germany	–	–	o	xo	xo	5.65	Q
8	B	Vadim Strogalyov	Russia	–	–	o	o	xxo	5.65	Q
9	A	Montxu Miranda	Spain	–	–	o	xo	xxo	5.65	Q
10	A	Iliyan Efremov	Bulgaria	–	–	o	o	xxx	5.55	q
10	A	Martin Voss	Denmark	–	o	o	o	xxx	5.55	q
10	B	Javier García	Spain	–	–	o	o	xxx	5.55	q
13	A	Piotr Buciarski	Denmark	–	xo	o	o	xxx	5.55	
13	A	Igor Trandenkov	Russia	–	–	xo	o	xxx	5.55	
15	A	Isaac Molinero	Spain	–	o	o	xo	xxx	5.55	
16	B	Ruhan Işim	Turkey	–	–	xo	xo	xxx	5.55	
17	A	Trond Barthel	Norway	–	–	o	xxo	xxx	5.55	
17	B	Nick Buckfield	Great Britain	–	–	o	xxo	xxx	5.55	
19	A	Rens Blom	Netherlands	–	o	xxo	xxo	xxx	5.55	
20	B	Peter Widén	Sweden	–	–	o	xxx		5.40	
20	B	Fabio Pizzolato	Italy	–	–	o	xxx		5.40	
22	A	Martin Kysela	Czech Republic	o	xo	o	xxx		5.40	
23	B	Martin Eriksson	Sweden	–	–	xo	xxx		5.40	
24	A	Aleksandrs Matusēvičs	Latvia	–	o	xxx			5.20	
25	A	Patrik Kristiansson	Sweden	–	xxo	xxx			5.20	
	B	Konstantin Semyonov	Israel	–	xxx				NM	

=== Final ===
Rank	Athlete	Nationality	5.30	5.50	5.60	5.70	5.75	5.80	5.85	Result	Notes
1st place, gold medalist(s)	Tim Lobinger	Germany	–	o	o	o	o	xxo	xxx	5.80	
2nd place, silver medalist(s)	Michael Stolle	Germany	–	xo	–	o	–	xxo	xxx	5.80	
3rd place, bronze medalist(s)	Danny Ecker	Germany	–	o	–	xo	xo	xxx		5.75	
4	Montxu Miranda	Spain	–	xxo	–	o	–	xxx		5.70	
5	Javier García	Spain	–	o	o	xxx				5.60	
6	Martin Voss	Denmark	o	xo	o	xxx				5.60	
7	Iliyan Efremov	Bulgaria	–	xo	xo	xx–	x			5.60	
8	Jean Galfione	France	–	o	–	xxx				5.50	
8	Romain Mesnil	France	o	o	xxx					5.50	
10	Vadim Strogalyov	Russia	–	xxo	–	–	xxx			5.50	
11	Gérald Baudouin	France	o	xxx						5.30	
	Pyotr Bochkaryov	Russia	–	–	xxx					NM	
