= Athletics at the 1990 Commonwealth Games – Men's pole vault =

Men's pole vault at the Commonwealth Games

The men's pole vault event at the 1990 Commonwealth Games was held on 2 February at the Mount Smart Stadium in Auckland.

== Results ==
Rank	Name	Nationality	4.60	4.80	5.00	5.10	5.20	5.25	5.30	5.35	5.55	Result	Notes
1st place, gold medalist(s)	Simon Arkell	Australia	–	–	o	–	o	xo	xo	xo	xxx	5.35	GR
2nd place, silver medalist(s)	Ian Tullett	England	–	xo	o	o	xo	xo	xx–	x		5.25	PB
3rd place, bronze medalist(s)	Simon Poelman	New Zealand	–	xo	o	–	xxo	–	xxx			5.20	NR
4	Neil Honey	Australia	–	xo	xo	–	xxo	xxx				5.20	
5	Paul Just	Canada										5.10	
6	Adam Steinhardt	Australia	–	o	o	xo	xxx					5.10	
7	Paul Gibbons	New Zealand										5.10	
7	Bob Ferguson	Canada										5.10	
9	Doug Wood	Canada	–	xo	xo	xxx						5.00	
10	Matt Belsham	England	xo	xxo	xo	xxx						5.00	
11	Derek McKee	New Zealand										4.80	
	Andy Ashurst	England										NM	
