= Athletics at the 1991 Pan American Games – Men's pole vault =

Men's pole vault at the Pan American Games

The men's pole vault event at the 1991 Pan American Games was held in Havana, Cuba on 8 August.

== Results ==
Rank	Name	Nationality	4.70	4.90	5.00	5.10	5.20	5.25	5.30	5.35	5.50	5.55	Result	Notes
1st place, gold medalist(s)	Pat Manson	United States	–	–	–	xo	–	o	–	o	xo	xxx	5.50	
2nd place, silver medalist(s)	Doug Wood	Canada	–	–	xxo	–	o	–	o	o	xxx		5.35	
3rd place, bronze medalist(s)	Ángel Eduardo García	Cuba	–	–	–	–	o	–	xx–	x			5.20	
4	Edgardo Díaz	Puerto Rico	–	–	–	xo	–	xxx					5.10	
5	Earl Bell	United States	–	–	o	–	xxx						5.00	
5	Miguel Berrio	Cuba	–	–	o	–	xxx						5.00	
7	Cristián Aspillaga	Chile	o	xxx									4.70	
	Miguel Saldarriaga	Colombia	–	–	–	xxx							NM	
	Thomas Riether	Chile											DNS	
