= Edgar Díaz (pole vaulter) =

Puerto Rican pole vaulter

Personal information
- Born: April 18, 1968 (age 58)

Sport
- Sport: Track and field
Medal record
Representing Puerto Rico
Central American and Caribbean Games
Gold medal – first place	1993 Ponce	Pole vault
Gold medal – first place	1998 Maracaibo	Pole vault

Edgardo "Edgar" Díaz Díaz (born April 18, 1968) is a former pole vaulter from Puerto Rico. He competed for his native country in two consecutive Summer Olympics, starting in 1992. He is also a two-time gold medalist at the Central American and Caribbean Games of 1993 and 1998.

== International competitions ==
Year	Competition	Venue	Position	Notes
Representing Puerto Rico
1986	Central American and Caribbean Junior Championships	Mexico City, Mexico	4th	3.65 m
1988	Ibero-American Championships	Mexico City, Mexico	7th	4.70 m A
1990	Central American and Caribbean Games	Mexico City, Mexico	4th	5.05 m
1991	Central American and Caribbean Championships	Xalapa, Mexico	1st	5.39 m
1991	Pan American Games	Havana, Cuba	4th	5.10 m
1991	World Championships	Tokyo, Japan	28th (q)	5.20 m
1992	Ibero-American Championships	Seville, Spain	1st	5.40 m
1992	Olympic Games	Barcelona, Spain	14th (q)	5.50 m
1993	World Indoor Championships	Toronto, Canada	16th (q)	5.40 m
1993	Central American and Caribbean Games	Ponce, Puerto Rico	1st	5.30 m
1995	Pan American Games	Mar del Plata, Argentina	–	NM
1995	Central American and Caribbean Championships	Guatemala City, Guatemala	3rd	5.20 m
1996	Ibero-American Championships	Medellín, Colombia	2nd	5.50 m
1996	Olympic Games	Atlanta, United States	28th (q)	5.40 m
1997	World Indoor Championships	Paris, France	18th (q)	5.30 m
1997	Central American and Caribbean Championships	San Juan, Puerto Rico	2nd	5.30 m
1997	World Championships	Athens, Greece	26th (q)	5.45 m
1998	Ibero-American Championships	Lisbon, Portugal	4th	5.30 m
1998	Central American and Caribbean Games	Maracaibo, Venezuela	1st	5.30 m
1999	Central American and Caribbean Championships	Bridgetown, Barbados	2nd	5.40 m
1999	Pan American Games	Winnipeg, Canada	–	NM
2000	Ibero-American Championships	Rio de Janeiro, Brazil	3rd	5.10 m
