= 1992 IAAF Grand Prix Final =

- Host city: Turin, Italy
- Events: 18
- Dates: 4 September
- Main venue: Stadio Delle Alpi di Torino

The 1992 IAAF Grand Prix Final was the eighth edition of the season-ending competition for the IAAF Grand Prix track and field circuit, organised by the International Association of Athletics Federations. It was held on 4 September at the Stadio Olimpico di Torino in Turin, Italy. Kevin Young (400 metres hurdles) and Heike Drechsler (long jump) were the overall points winners of the tournament. A total of 17 athletics events were contested, nine for men and eight for women.

The host stadium was not of a suitable size to safely host the men's hammer throw event, so this was instead contested separately in Brussels at the annual Memorial Van Damme meeting.

== Medal summary ==
=== Men ===
Event	Gold		Silver		Bronze	
100 metres	Dennis Mitchell (USA)	10.09	Carl Lewis (USA)	10.18	Leroy Burrell (USA)	10.20
800 metres	Andrea Benvenuti (ITA)	1:45.61	Nixon Kiprotich (KEN)	1:45.92	Tom McKean (GBR)	1:46.06
One mile	Wilfred Kirochi (KEN)	4:00.06	William Kemei (KEN)	4:00.19	Joseph Chesire (KEN)	4:00.24
5000 metres	Brahim Boutayeb (MAR)	13:45.42	Paul Bitok (KEN)	13:45.90	William Sigei (KEN)	13:46.92
400 m hurdles	Kevin Young (USA)	48.16	Winthrop Graham (JAM)	48.25	Samuel Matete (ZAM)	48.34
High jump	Patrik Sjöberg (SWE)	2.33 m	Troy Kemp (BAH)	2.33 m	Charles Austin (USA)	2.25 m
Triple jump	Brian Wellman (BER)	17.25 m	Frank Rutherford (BAH)	17.15 m	Leonid Voloshin (EUN)	16.99 m
Shot put	Werner Günthör (SUI)	20.92 m	Gregg Tafralis (USA)	20.72 m	Alessandro Andrei (ITA)	20.14 m
Hammer throw	Igor Nikulin (EUN)	80.24 m	Igor Astapkovich (EUN)	79.52 m	Lance Deal (USA)	79.34 m

=== Women ===
Event	Gold		Silver		Bronze	
200 metres	Merlene Ottey (JAM)	22.03	Irina Privalova (EUN)	22.06	Gwen Torrence (USA)	22.10
400 metres	Olga Bryzgina (EUN)	50.22	Sandie Richards (JAM)	50.51	Ximena Restrepo (COL)	50.64
1500 metres	Lyudmila Rogachova (EUN)	4:19.49	Lyubov Kremlyova (EUN)	4:19.62	Violeta Beclea (ROM)	4:19.68
5000 metres	Sonia O'Sullivan (IRL)	15:18.44	Hellen Kimaiyo (KEN)	15:19.20	Christine Toonstra (NED)	15:19.51
100 m hurdles	Gail Devers (USA)	12.73	Michelle Freeman (JAM)	12.88	Lynda Tolbert (USA)	12.89
Long jump	Heike Drechsler (GER)	7.12 m	Jackie Joyner-Kersee (USA)	6.98 m	Inessa Kravets (EUN)	6.80 m
Discus throw	Ilke Wyludda (GER)	67.90 m	Larisa Korotkevich (EUN)	65.70 m	Irina Yatchenko (EUN)	65.50 m
Javelin throw	Trine Hattestad (NOR)	66.58 m	Natalya Shikolenko (EUN)	63.66 m	Silke Renk (GER)	62.10 m

== Points leaders ==
=== Men ===
Event	Gold		Silver		Bronze	
Overall	Kevin Young (USA)	63	Werner Günthör (SUI)	63	Igor Astapkovich (EUN)	59
100 metres	Dennis Mitchell (USA)	53	Olapade Adeniken (NGR)	51	Linford Christie (GBR)	43
800 metres	Nixon Kiprotich (KEN)	55	Andrea Benvenuti (ITA)	54	William Tanui (KEN)	52
One mile	Wilfred Kirochi (KEN)	58	William Kemei (KEN)	48	Joseph Chesire (KEN)	44
5000 metres	Paul Bitok (KEN)	57	Richard Chelimo (KEN)	46	Brahim Boutayeb (MAR)	41
400 m hurdles	Kevin Young (USA)	63	Samuel Matete (ZAM)	55	Winthrop Graham (JAM)	48
High jump	Patrik Sjöberg (SWE)	56.5	Troy Kemp (BAH)	51	Hollis Conway (USA)	46.5
Triple jump	Mike Conley, Sr. (USA)	46	Leonid Voloshin (EUN)	39	Brian Wellman (BER)	36
Shot put	Werner Günthör (SUI)	63	Aleksandr Klimenko (EUN)	41	Gregg Tafralis (USA)	37
Hammer throw	Igor Astapkovich (EUN)	59	Igor Nikulin (EUN)	55	Yuriy Sedykh (EUN)	42

=== Women ===
Event	Gold		Silver		Bronze	
Overall	Heike Drechsler (GER)	63	Merlene Ottey (JAM)	61	Trine Hattestad (NOR)	59
200 metres	Merlene Ottey (JAM)	61	Gwen Torrence (USA)	53	Galina Malchugina (EUN)	51
400 metres	Sandie Richards (JAM)	51	Ximena Restrepo (COL)	47	Olga Bryzgina (EUN)	41
1500 metres	Lyudmila Rogachova (EUN)	59	Lyubov Kremlyova (EUN)	50	Doina Melinte (ROM)	36
5000 metres	Sonia O'Sullivan (IRL)	48	Esther Kiplagat (KEN)	36	Shelly Steely (USA)	27
100 m hurdles	Lynda Tolbert (USA)	57	Gail Devers (USA)	54	Michelle Freeman (JAM)	48
Long jump	Heike Drechsler (GER)	63	Inessa Kravets (EUN)	53	Jackie Joyner-Kersee (USA)	51
Discus throw	Ilke Wyludda (GER)	49	Irina Yatchenko (EUN)	48	Daniela Costian (AUS)	35
Javelin throw	Trine Hattestad (NOR)	59	Natalya Shikolenko (EUN)	59	Silke Renk (GER)	41
