= 1986 World Junior Championships in Athletics – Men's pole vault =

The men's pole vault event at the 1986 World Junior Championships in Athletics was held in Athens, Greece, at Olympic Stadium on 16 and 17 July.

== Medalists ==
| Gold | Igor Potapovich; Soviet Union |
| Silver | Delko Lesev; Bulgaria |
| Bronze | Michael Thiede; East Germany |

== Results ==
=== Final ===
17 July

| Rank | Name | Nationality | Result | Notes |
|---|---|---|---|---|
| 1st place, gold medalist(s) | Igor Potapovich | Soviet Union | 5.50 | |
| 2nd place, silver medalist(s) | Delko Lesev | Bulgaria | 5.40 | |
| 3rd place, bronze medalist(s) | Michael Thiede | East Germany | 5.30 | |
| 4 | Karsten Wichert | East Germany | 5.30 | |
| 5 | Grigoriy Yegorov | Soviet Union | 5.20 | |
| 6 | Tim McMichael | United States | 5.10 | |
| 7 | Jani Lehtonen | Finland | 5.10 | |
| 8 | Philippe D'Encausse | France | 5.00 | |
| | Patrik Johansson | Sweden | 5.00 | |
| 10 | Wojciech Dakiniewicz | Poland | 5.00 | |
| 11 | Vijay Pal Singh | India | 5.00 | |
| | Martin Voss | Denmark | NH | |
| | Peter Widén | Sweden | NH | |
| | Pat Manson | United States | NH | |

=== Qualifications ===
16 Jul

==== Group A ====
| Rank | Name | Nationality | Result | Notes |
|---|---|---|---|---|
| 1 | Delko Lesev | Bulgaria | 5.00 | Q |
| | Jani Lehtonen | Finland | 5.00 | Q |
| | Philippe D'Encausse | France | 5.00 | Q |
| | Karsten Wichert | East Germany | 5.00 | Q |
| | Michael Thiede | East Germany | 5.00 | Q |
| | Wojciech Dakiniewicz | Poland | 5.00 | Q |
| | Grigoriy Yegorov | Soviet Union | 5.00 | Q |
| | Igor Potapovich | Soviet Union | 5.00 | Q |
| | Tim McMichael | United States | 5.00 | Q |
| | Pat Manson | United States | 5.00 | Q |
| 11 | Steve Wilson | Australia | 4.90 | |
| | István Bagyula | Hungary | NH | |

==== Group B ====
| Rank | Name | Nationality | Result | Notes |
|---|---|---|---|---|
| 1 | Martin Voss | Denmark | 5.00 | Q |
| | Vijay Pal Singh | India | 5.00 | Q |
| | Peter Widén | Sweden | 5.00 | Q |
| | Patrik Johansson | Sweden | 5.00 | Q |
| 5 | Kevin Rankin | Canada | 4.80 | |
| | Gianfranco Beda | Italy | 4.80 | |
| 7 | Juan Miguel Saldarriaga | Colombia | 4.70 | |
| 8 | Samir Agsous | Algeria | 4.40 | |
| | Efrain Meléndez | Puerto Rico | 4.40 | |
| | Martin Bossio | Argentina | NH | |
| | Stuart Love | Canada | NH | |
| | Hiroyuki Sano | Japan | NH | |
| | Nasser Mohamed Al-Wahibi | Saudi Arabia | NH | |

== Participation ==
According to an unofficial count, 25 athletes from 20 countries participated in the event.

- Algeria (1)
- Argentina (1)
- Australia (1)
- Bulgaria (1)
- Canada (2)
- Colombia (1)
- Denmark (1)
- East Germany (2)
- Finland (1)
- France (1)
- Hungary (1)
- India (1)
- Italy (1)
- Japan (1)
- Poland (1)
- Puerto Rico (1)
- Saudi Arabia (1)
- Soviet Union (2)
- Sweden (2)
- United States (2)
