= 1989 IAAF World Indoor Championships – Men's pole vault =

The men's pole vault event at the 1989 IAAF World Indoor Championships was held at the Budapest Sportcsarnok in Budapest on 3 and 4 March.

== Results ==
=== Qualification ===
Qualification: 5.45 metres (Q) or the best 12 (q) qualified for the final

Rank	Name	Nationality	Result	Notes
1	Billy Olson	United States	5.45	Q
1	Radion Gataullin	Soviet Union	5.45	Q
3	Grigoriy Yegorov	Soviet Union	5.45	Q
3	Joe Dial	United States	5.45	Q
5	Javier García	Spain	5.40	q
6	Alberto Ruiz	Spain	5.40	q
7	Asko Peltoniemi	Finland	5.30	q
7	Delko Lesev	Bulgaria	5.30	q
7	Peter Widén	Sweden	5.30	q
7	István Bagyula	Hungary	5.30	q
7	Atanas Tarev	Bulgaria	5.30	q
7	Bernhard Zintl	West Germany	5.30	q
13	Hermann Fehringer	Austria	5.30	q
13	Mirosław Chmara	Poland	5.30	q
	Harri Palola	Finland	NM	
	Doug Wood	Canada	NM	

=== Final ===
Rank	Name	Nationality	5.30	5.40	5.50	5.60	5.65	5.70	5.75	5.80	5.85	5.90	6.04	Result	Notes
1st place, gold medalist(s)	Radion Gataullin	Soviet Union	–	–	–	–	–	o	–	–	xxo	–	xxx	5.85	=CR
2nd place, silver medalist(s)	Grigoriy Yegorov	Soviet Union	–	–	o	–	–	o	–	xo	xx–	x		5.80	PB
3rd place, bronze medalist(s)	Joe Dial	United States	–	–	xo	o	o	xxo	x					5.70	
4	Mirosław Chmara	Poland	–	o	–	o	–	xx						5.60	
5	Bernhard Zintl	West Germany	o	–	o	xo	–	x						5.60	=PB
6	István Bagyula	Hungary	o	o	o	xxx								5.50	
7	Alberto Ruiz	Spain	o	–	xo	xxx								5.50	
8	Javier García	Spain												5.50	
9	Asko Peltoniemi	Finland												5.40	
10	Peter Widén	Sweden												5.40	
11	Atanas Tarev	Bulgaria	–	xxo	–	x								5.40	
12	Delko Lesev	Bulgaria												5.30	
	Hermann Fehringer	Austria												NM	
	Billy Olson	United States												NM	
