= Scott Hennig =

American pole vaulter (born 1969)

Personal information
- Born: April 17, 1969 (age 57)

Sport
- Country: United States
- Sport: Athletics
- Event: Pole vault
Medal record
Pan American Games
Silver medal – second place	1999 Winnipeg	Pole vault

Scott Hennig (born April 17, 1969) is an American former athlete who specialized in the pole vault.

Hennig, a Canyon High School graduate, attended Southwest Texas State University and was a four-time SLC indoor champion. He won the pole vault at the U.S. national indoor championships in 1998 and the following year finished second to Pat Manson at the Pan American Games in Winnipeg, to claim a silver medal for the United States.
