= 1993 IAAF Grand Prix Final =

- Host city: London, United Kingdom
- Events: 18
- Dates: 10 September
- Main venue: Crystal Palace National Sports Centre

The 1993 IAAF Grand Prix Final was the ninth edition of the season-ending competition for the IAAF Grand Prix track and field circuit, organised by the International Association of Athletics Federations. It was held on 10 September at the Crystal Palace National Sports Centre in London, United Kingdom.

Sergey Bubka (pole vault) and Sandra Farmer-Patrick (400 metres hurdles) were the overall points winners of the tournament. This made Bubka the second man (and ultimately the last) to repeat as winner of the series, following the achievement set by Saïd Aouita. The 1993 edition marked a change in the rules, where the winners at the Grand Prix Final were declared the series winner for their event. Previously, the athlete with the most points in an event throughout the season was declared the series winner in the discipline, regardless of their performance at the final. A total of 18 athletics events were contested, ten for men and eight for women.

== Medal summary ==
=== Men ===
Event	Gold		Silver		Bronze	
Overall	Sergey Bubka (UKR)	72 pts	Jan Železný (CZE)	72 pts	Colin Jackson (GBR)	72 pts
200 metres	Frankie Fredericks (NAM)	20.34	John Regis (GBR)	20.34	Michael Johnson (USA)	20.41
400 metres	David Grindley (GBR)	44.81	Butch Reynolds (USA)	44.96	Quincy Watts (USA)	45.06
1500 metres	Noureddine Morceli (ALG)	3:31.60	Abdi Bile (SOM)	3:34.65	Matthew Yates (GBR)	3:35.04
5000 metres	Ismael Kirui (KEN)	13:23.26	Richard Chelimo (KEN)	13:24.30	Stéphane Franke (GER)	13:25.36
3000 metres steeplechase	Patrick Sang (KEN)	8:15.53	Moses Kiptanui (KEN)	8:15.66	Julius Kariuki (KEN)	8:16.26
110 m hurdles	Colin Jackson (GBR)	13.14	Tony Jarrett (GBR)	13.35	Mark McKoy (CAN)	13.36
Pole vault	Sergey Bubka (UKR)	6.05 m	Grigoriy Yegorov (KAZ)	5.90 m	Maksim Tarasov (RUS)	5.80 m
Long jump	Mike Powell (USA)	8.54 m	Ivailo Mladenov (BUL)	8.20 m	Tony Barton (USA)	8.12 m
Discus throw	Lars Riedel (GER)	64.90 m	Anthony Washington (USA)	64.62 m	Jürgen Schult (GER)	64.12 m
Javelin throw	Jan Železný (CZE)	88.28 m	Raymond Hecht (GER)	84.84 m	Mick Hill (GBR)	83.52 m

=== Women ===
Event	Gold		Silver		Bronze	
Overall	Sandra Farmer-Patrick (USA)	72 pts	Sonia O'Sullivan (IRL)	72 pts	Stefka Kostadinova (BUL)	72 pts
100 metres	Gwen Torrence (USA)	11.03	Irina Privalova (RUS)	11.09	Juliet Cuthbert (JAM)	11.22
800 metres	Maria Mutola (MOZ)	1:57.35	Lyubov Gurina (RUS)	1:59.07	Svetlana Masterkova (RUS)	1:59.28
One mile	Lyubov Kremlyova (RUS)	4:24.40	Sonia O'Sullivan (IRL)	4:24.97	Violeta Beclea (ROM)	4:27.64
3000 metres	Sonia O'Sullivan (IRL)	8:38.12	Yvonne Murray (GBR)	8:41.99	Alison Wyeth (GBR)	8:47.96
400 m hurdles	Sandra Farmer-Patrick (USA)	53.69	Sally Gunnell (GBR)	53.82	Kim Batten (USA)	53.86
High jump	Stefka Kostadinova (BUL)	1.98 m	Alina Astafei (ROM)	1.91 m	Hanne Haugland (NOR)	1.91 m
Triple jump	Yolanda Chen (RUS)	14.39 m	Galina Chistyakova (RUS)	14.12 m	Irina Mushayilova (RUS)	13.83 m
Shot put	Svetlana Krivelyova (RUS)	19.61 m	Astrid Kumbernuss (GER)	19.37 m	Vita Pavlysh (UKR)	19.22 m
