= Predixion Software =

- Type: Subsidiary
- Industry: Predictive Analytics Software
- Founded: 2009
- Headquarters: San Juan Capistrano, United States
- Area served: Worldwide
- Owner: Greenwave Systems
- Website: Greenwave Systems

Predixion Software is a software company focusing on edge analytics for connected assets. It was founded in late 2009 and is headquartered in Aliso Viejo, CA.

In September 2016, the company was acquired by Greenwave Systems.

== History ==
Predixion Software was established in late 2009 with four founding partners: Stuart Frost (founder of DATAllegro, acquired by Microsoft in 2008), Simon Arkell, Stephen DeSantis, and Jamie MacLennan

In September 2010, the first product release was announced; company closed its Series A Funding Round in October 2010 for $5 million led by DFJ Frontier.

Predixion accepted into the EMC Select Program; EMC led company's Series B Funding Round in September 2011 for $6 million.

Early 2012, company released predictive analytics software for the healthcare industry.

In August 2013, Predixion closed its largest funding round at $20 million for Series C led by Accenture and GE.

In January 2014, company released "Predixion in the Classroom" program allowing students and teachers free access to some Predixion Insight services. In October, Predixion joined with Salesforce.com, In December, the company relocated corporate headquarters to Aliso Viejo, California.

== Awards ==
- Trend-Setting Products in Data and Information Management for 2015 by Database Trends and Applications (December, 2014)
- Microsoft Health Users Group Innovation Award
- Big Data 50 – selected as one of the hottest Big Data startups of 2014.
- Outstanding Technology CEO (Simon Arkell) from OC Tech Alliance (2014).
