= 1988 World Junior Championships in Athletics – Men's pole vault =

The men's pole vault event at the 1988 World Junior Championships in Athletics was held in Sudbury, Ontario, Canada, at Laurentian University Stadium on 27 and 28 July.

== Medalists ==
Gold	István Bagyula; Hungary
Silver	Maksim Tarasov; Soviet Union
Bronze	Andrey Grudinin; Soviet Union

== Results ==
=== Final ===
28 July

Rank	Name	Nationality	Result	Notes
1st place, gold medalist(s)	István Bagyula	Hungary	5.65	
2nd place, silver medalist(s)	Maksim Tarasov	Soviet Union	5.60	
3rd place, bronze medalist(s)	Andrey Grudinin	Soviet Union	5.30	
4	Gianni Iapichino	Italy	5.20	
4	Gregory Fenza	United States	5.20	
6	Carl Johan Alm	Sweden	5.10	
7	Adam Steinhardt	Australia	5.10	
8	Petri Peltoniemi	Finland	5.10	
9	Kim Cheol-Gyun	South Korea	5.00	
10	Ilian Efremov	Bulgaria	4.80	
10	Marc Osenberg	West Germany	4.80	
	Lin Xuetao	China	NH	
	Ossi Helander	Finland	NH	
	Patrick Frederick	United States	NH	

=== Qualifications ===
27 Jul

==== Group A ====
Rank	Name	Nationality	Result	Notes
1	Andrey Grudinin	Soviet Union	5.15	Q
2	Kim Cheol-Gyun	South Korea	5.15	Q
3	Adam Steinhardt	Australia	5.15	Q
3	Ilian Efremov	Bulgaria	5.15	Q
5	Petri Peltoniemi	Finland	5.10	q
6	Gianni Iapichino	Italy	5.10	q
7	Ossi Helander	Finland	5.00	q
8	Lin Xuetao	China	5.00	q
9	Patrick Frederick	United States	5.00	q
10	Martin Amann	West Germany	4.80	

==== Group B ====
Rank	Name	Nationality	Result	Notes
1	István Bagyula	Hungary	5.15	Q
1	Maksim Tarasov	Soviet Union	5.15	Q
3	Gregory Fenza	United States	5.15	Q
4	Carl Johan Alm	Sweden	5.10	q
5	Marc Osenberg	West Germany	5.00	q
6	Jean-Michel Godard	France	4.90	
7	Tadeusz Tomaszewski	Poland	4.90	
	Hrístos Pallakis	Greece	NH	

== Participation ==
According to an unofficial count, 18 athletes from 14 countries participated in the event.

- Australia (1)
- Bulgaria (1)
- China (1)
- Finland (2)
- France (1)
- Greece (1)
- Hungary (1)
- Italy (1)
- Poland (1)
- South Korea (1)
- Soviet Union (2)
- Sweden (1)
- United States (2)
- West Germany (2)
