= 1989 European Athletics Indoor Championships – Men's pole vault =

The men's pole vault event at the 1989 European Athletics Indoor Championships was held on 19 February.

== Results ==
Rank	Name	Nationality	Result	Notes
1st place, gold medalist(s)	Grigoriy Yegorov	Soviet Union	5.75	
2nd place, silver medalist(s)	Igor Potapovich	Soviet Union	5.75	
3rd place, bronze medalist(s)	Mirosław Chmara	Poland	5.70	
4	Bernhard Zintl	West Germany	5.60	
4	Marian Kolasa	Poland	5.60	
6	István Bagyula	Hungary	5.60	
7	Atanas Tarev	Bulgaria	5.50	
8	Hermann Fehringer	Austria	5.40	
9	Philippe d'Encausse	France	5.40	
9	Javier García	Spain	5.40	
9	Peter Widén	Sweden	5.40	
12	Alberto Ruiz	Spain	5.40	
12	Harri Palola	Finland	5.40	
14	Zdeněk Lubenský	Czechoslovakia	5.30	
15	Jean-Marc Tailhardat	France	5.30	
16	Marco Andreini	Italy	5.20	
17	Enzo Brichese	Italy	5.20	
	Arto Peltoniemi	Finland	NM	
	Nikolay Nikolov	Bulgaria	NM	
