= Demi Payne =

American athlete (born 1991)

Personal information
- Nationality: American
- Born: September 30, 1991 (age 35) New Braunfels, Texas
- Height: 5 ft 8 in (173 cm)
- Weight: 143 lb (65 kg)
- Parent: Bill Payne (father)

Sport
- Country: United States
- Sport: Track and field
- Event: Pole vault
- College team: Stephen F. Austin State University; University of Kansas
- Turned pro: 2016

Achievements and titles
- Personal best: 4.90 m (16 ft 3/4 in) (i)

Demi Payne (born September 30, 1991) is a former American pole vaulter.

== Early life and collegiate career ==
She grew up with a pole vault pit in the back yard, but didn't start vaulting until her sophomore year of high school. Payne first attended the University of Kansas for two and a half years where she was a mid-13-foot vaulter, but never made it to 14. "I went out on the weekends and I pole vaulted during the week and it really wasn't No. 1 for me." She said she got more focused while training after she learned she was pregnant. She gave birth to daughter Charlee on October 22, 2013. After transferring to Stephen F. Austin, to be closer to her family, she began marked improvement. She set the indoor and outdoor NCAA records at the time, though both the outdoor pole vault record was surpassed by Sandi Morris.

Payne competed collegiately for Stephen F. Austin State University.

== Senior career ==
Demi Payne won gold medal on March 1, 2015 2015 USA Indoor Track and Field Championships Pole Vault with a height of 4.55 m (14 ft 11 in). She won a bronze medal June 28, 2015 USA Outdoor Track and Field Championships Pole Vault with a height of 4.60 m (15 ft 1 in) She competed in the pole vault event at the 2015 World Championships in Athletics in Beijing, China placing 19th in the qualification round.

Payne recorded a series of personal bests during 2015 and 2016. She set a new personal best in Albuquerque at 4.75 m (15 ft 7 in) in January 2015, followed in February 2016 at a meet also in Albuquerque at 4.88 m (16 ft 0 in). At the time she moved up the all-time list to tie former world record holder Svetlana Feofanova for the fourth best female pole vaulter in history. The following week Payne improved again at 2016 Millrose Games with a career best of 4.90 m (16 ft 3/4 in) and winning the silver medal.

On March 12, 2016, Payne participated in the 2016 USA Indoor Track and Field Championships initially placing third with a height of 4.85 m (15 ft 10 3/4 in), however she tested positive for drostanolone at the event and was provisionally suspended under anti-doping rules with her result disqualified. Her suspension was lifted in July 2016 to allow her to participate in the US Olympic trials where she did not progress beyond the preliminary round. In August 2018 the United States Anti-Doping Agency announced that Payne had been served with a four-year ban for the anti-doping rule violation, backdated to March 31, 2016, and forfeited every result from March 12, 2016.

== Personal life ==
She is the daughter of American pole vaulter Bill Payne.

== Competition record ==
=== USA National Championships ===
Year	Competition	Venue	Position	Notes
2016	2016 United States Olympic Trials (track and field)	Eugene, Oregon	16th	4.25 m (13 ft 11 in)
2016	USA Indoor Track and Field Championships	Portland, Oregon	DQ	Doping
2015	USA Outdoor Track and Field Championships	Eugene, Oregon	3rd	4.60 m (15 ft 1 in)
2015	USA Indoor Track and Field Championships	Boston, Massachusetts	1st	4.55 m (14 ft 11 in)

== NCAA ==
School Year	Indoor Conference	Indoor NCAA	Outdoor Conference	Outdoor NCAA
Kansas '10-'11	3.92 m (12 ft 10 in); 8th	DNQ	3.98 m (13 ft 1 in); 8th	3.85 m (12 ft 8 in); 22nd in West Prelims
Kansas '11-'12	4.15 m (13 ft 7 in); 2nd	DNQ	4.13 m (13 ft 7 in); 3rd	4.15 m (13 ft 7 in); 13th
Kansas '12-'13	3.88 m (12 ft 9 in); 4th	NH	-	-
Stephen F. Austin '14-'15	4.28 m (14 ft 1 in); 1st	NH	4.71 m (15 ft 5 in); 1st	4.70 m (15 ft 5 in); 1st
Stephen F. Austin '15-'16				
