= Adam Steinhardt =

Australian pole vaulter (1969–2025)

Adam Paul Steinhardt (5 December 1969 – 20 January 2025) was an Australian pole vaulter, who represented his native country in two consecutive Commonwealth Games, starting in 1990. He cleared a personal best of 5.51m on 14 February 1996 in Adelaide, South Australia. Steinhardt was also a public speaker and inbound marketing executive.

== Biography ==
=== Business career ===
Steinhardt became the managing director of Next Byte, a retail chain selling Apple macs in 1995 and left it in 2005.

In 2012, Steinhardt re-entered the Apple market, starting up an Apple reseller in Adelaide, called eRepublic.

=== The Kingdom ===
In 2009, he co-founded The Kingdom, an Adelaide-based advertising agency.

In 2015, The Kingdom became a Certified HubSpot Partner and won the 2015 HubSpot International Partner of the Year Award, with Steinhardt as the Managing Director.

In 2016, The Kingdom became a Platinum Certified HubSpot Partner.

=== Death ===
Steinhardt died from bowel cancer on 20 January 2025, aged 55.

== Achievements ==
Year	Competition	Venue	Position	Notes
1988	World Junior Championships	Sudbury, Canada	7th	5.10 m
1990	Commonwealth Games	Auckland, New Zealand	6th	5.10 m
1994	Commonwealth Games	Victoria, Canada	—	NM
