= Chad Harting =

American pole vaulter (born 1972)

Personal information
- Full name: Chadwick E. Harting
- Born: February 10, 1972 (age 54) St. Louis, Missouri, U.S.

Sport
- Country: United States
- Sport: Athletics
- Event: Pole vault
Medal record
Representing United States
Summer Universiade
| Silver medal – second place | 1997 Catania | Pole vault |

Chadwick E. "Chad" Harting (born February 20, 1972) is a retired American pole vaulter.

He won the silver medal at the 1997 Summer Universiade. He competed at the 2000 Summer Olympics in Sydney, in the men's pole vault. His personal best jump was 5.80 metres, achieved indoors in January 2000 in Reno, Nevada.

Harting was born in St. Louis, Missouri.
