= Andy Ashurst =

British pole vaulter (born 1965)

Personal information
- Nationality: British (English)
- Born: 2 January 1965 (age 61) Manchester, England
- Height: 178 cm (5 ft 10 in)
- Weight: 69 kg (152 lb)

Sport
- Sport: Athletics
- Event: Pole vault
- Club: Sale Harriers
Medal record
Athletics
Representing England
Commonwealth Games
Gold medal – first place	1986 Edinburgh	pole vault

Andrew John Ashurst (born 2 January 1965) is a British male former pole vaulter who competed at the 1988 Summer Olympics.

== Biography ==
Ashurst attended Sale Boys' Grammar School and Birmingham University.

Ashurst represented England and won a gold medal in the pole vault, at the 1986 Commonwealth Games in Edinburgh, Scotland. Four years later he represented England, at the 1990 Commonwealth Games in Auckland, New Zealand and competed in a third Games when he represented England, at the 1994 Commonwealth Games in Victoria, Canada.

Ashurst became the British pole vault champion after winning the British AAA Championships title at the 1994 AAA Championships.

His daughter Sophie is also a keen pole vaulter who is coached by her father as well as attending Loughborough University.

== International competitions ==
Year	Competition	Venue	Position	Notes
Representing Great Britain and England
1985	Universiade	Kobe, Japan	9th	5.00 m
1986	Commonwealth Games	Edinburgh, United Kingdom	1st	5.30 m
1986	European Championships	Stuttgart, West Germany	–	NM
1988	Olympic Games	Seoul, South Korea	–	NM
1989	World Cup	Barcelona, Spain	7th	5.40 m
1990	European Indoor Championships	Glasgow, United Kingdom	10th	5.20 m
1990	Commonwealth Games	Auckland, New Zealand	–	NM
1992	European Indoor Championships	Genoa, Italy	12th	5.40 m
1994	Commonwealth Games	Victoria, Canada	6th	5.20 m
