= Pat Manson =

American pole vaulter (born 1967)

Personal information
- Born: November 29, 1967 (age 58) West Point, New York, U.S.

Sport
- Country: United States
- Sport: Pole vaulting
Medal record
Representing United States
Pan American Games
Gold medal – first place	1991 Havana	Pole vault
Gold medal – first place	1995 Mar del Plata	Pole vault
Gold medal – first place	1999 Winnipeg	Pole vault

Pat Manson (born November 29, 1967) is an American retired pole vaulter, best known for winning three gold medals at the Pan American Games in 1991, 1995 and 1999. He also finished sixth at the 1997 World Championships in Athletics in Athens. His personal best was 5.85 meters (19 ft 2 in), achieved in September 1994 in Tokyo.

Manson grew up in Aurora, Colorado where he attended Aurora Central High School. He was an All-America vaulter for the Kansas Jayhawks track and field team, placing runner-up in the pole vault at the 1989 NCAA Division I Indoor Track and Field Championships, 1989 NCAA Division I Outdoor Track and Field Championships, 1989 NCAA Division I Outdoor Track and Field Championships, and 1990 NCAA Division I Indoor Track and Field Championships.

He finished third behind Simon Arkell and Tim Bright at the British 1993 AAA Championships.

In 2017, his son and daughter both surpassed his freshman best mark vaulting for Monarch High School.

== Achievements ==
Year	Competition	Venue	Position	Notes
Representing the United States
1986	Pan American Junior Championships	Winter Park, United States	2nd	4.80 meters (15 ft 9 in)
1986	World Junior Championships	Athens, Greece	1st (h)	5.00 meters (16 ft 5 in)
1991	Pan American Games	Havana, Cuba	1st	5.50 meters (18 ft 1 in)
1995	Pan American Games	Mar del Plata, Argentina	1st	5.75 meters (18 ft 10 in)
1997	World Championships	Athens, Greece	6th	5.70 meters (18 ft 8 in)
1998	Goodwill Games	Uniondale, United States	3rd	5.70 meters (18 ft 8 in)
1999	Pan American Games	Winnipeg, Canada	1st	5.60 meters (18 ft 4 in)
1999	World Championships	Seville, Spain	14th (q)	5.55 meters (18 ft 3 in)
