= Werner Holl =

German pole vaulter

Personal information
- Born: 28 January 1970 (age 56)

Sport
- Sport: Track and field
Medal record
Representing Germany
Summer Universiade
| Bronze medal – third place | 1997 Catania | Pole vault |

Werner Holl (born 28 January 1970) is a retired German pole vaulter.

He finished sixth at the 1993 World Indoor Championships and won the bronze medal at the 1997 Summer Universiade. He no-heighted at the 1992 European Indoor Championships, and competed at the 1993 World Championships without reaching the final.

Holl became German indoor champion in 1994, won a silver in 1993 and bronze in 1995. At the main German championships, he won a bronze medal in 1991 and silver medals in 1993, 1994 and 1997. He represented the club LG VfB/Kickers Stuttgart. His personal best jump was 5.80 metres, achieved indoors in March 1993 in Nördlingen.
