= Jean-Kersley Gardenne =

Mauritian pole vaulter (born 1972)

Personal information
- Born: 16 February 1972 (age 54)

Sport
- Sport: Track and field
Medal record
Representing Mauritius
Commonwealth Games
| Bronze medal – third place | 1998 Kuala Lumpur | Pole vault |
African Championships
| Silver medal – second place | 1990 Cairo | Pole vault |
| Silver medal – second place | 1992 Belle Vue Harel | Pole vault |
| Silver medal – second place | 1998 Dakar | Pole vault |

Jean-Kersley Gardenne (born 16 February 1972) is a retired Mauritian pole vaulter.

His personal best jump is 5.50 metres, achieved in June 1996 in Dreux. This is the Mauritian record. He did however have a better indoor mark with 5.60 metres, achieved in January 1998 in Liévin.

== Achievements ==
| Year | Competition | Venue | Position | Notes |
Representing Mauritius
| 1990 | African Championships | Cairo, Egypt | 2nd | 4.70 m |
| 1990 | World Junior Championships | Plovdiv, Bulgaria | 17th (q) | 4.70 m |
| 1991 | Universiade | Sheffield, United Kingdom | 18th (q) | 5.00 m |
| 1991 | All-Africa Games | Cairo, Egypt | 3rd | 5.00 m |
| 1992 | African Championships | Belle Vue Maurel, Mauritius | 2nd | 5.30 m |
| 1992 | Olympic Games | Barcelona, Spain | 24th (q) | 5.20 m |
| 1995 | All-Africa Games | Harare, Zimbabwe | 2nd | 5.20 m |
| 1996 | Olympic Games | Atlanta, United States | – | NM |
| 1997 | World Indoor Championships | Paris, France | – | NM |
| 1998 | African Championships | Dakar, Senegal | 2nd | 5.20 m |
| 1998 | Commonwealth Games | Kuala Lumpur, Malaysia | 3rd | 5.35 m |
