= Martin Voss =

Danish pole vaulter

Martin Peter Voss (born 5 September 1967) is a Danish retired athlete who specialised in the pole vault. He represented his country at the 1996 Summer Olympics, as well as five consecutive World Championships, starting in 1991. His only major final came at the 1998 European Indoor Championships where he finished sixth.

His personal bests in the event are 5.70 metres outdoors (Lyngby 1996) and 5.72 metres indoors (Malmö 1995). The latter is the still standing national record.

== Competition record ==
Year	Competition	Venue	Position	Notes
Representing Denmark
1986	World Junior Championships	Athens, Greece	1st (q)	5.00 m
1991	World Championships	Tokyo, Japan	29th (q)	5.20 m
1992	European Indoor Championships	Genoa, Italy	18th (q)	5.15 m
1993	World Championships	Stuttgart, Germany	26th (q)	5.45 m
1994	European Indoor Championships	Paris, France	15th (q)	5.40 m
1994	European Championships	Helsinki, Finland	17th (q)	5.40 m
1995	World Indoor Championships	Barcelona, Spain	19th (q)	5.50 m
1995	World Championships	Gothenburg, Sweden	27th (q)	5.20 m
1996	Olympic Games	Atlanta, United States	26th (q)	5.40 m
1997	World Indoor Championships	Paris, France	15th (q)	5.55 m
1997	World Championships	Athens, Greece	–	NM
1998	European Indoor Championships	Valencia, Spain	6th	5.60 m
1998	European Championships	Budapest, Hungary	17th (q)	5.30 m
1999	World Championships	Seville, Spain	23rd (q)	5.40 m
