= Athletics at the 1997 Summer Universiade – Men's pole vault =

The men's pole vault event at the 1997 Summer Universiade was held at the Stadio Cibali in Catania, Italy, on 27 and 28 August.

== Medalists ==
Gold	Silver	Bronze
Khalid Lachheb; France	Chad Harting; United States	Werner Holl; Germany

== Results ==
=== Qualification ===
Rank	Group	Athlete	Nationality	Result	Notes
1	?	Nuno Fernandes	Portugal	5.30	
?	?	Fabio Pizzolato	Italy	5.20	
?	?	Jurij Rovan	Slovenia	5.20	
?	?	Jeff Hayhoe	Canada	5.20	
?	?	Oscar Janson	Sweden	5.20	
?	?	Rens Blom	Netherlands	5.20	
?	?	Werner Holl	Germany	5.20	
?	?	Chad Harting	United States	5.20	
?	?	Khalid Lachheb	France	5.20	
?	?	Yevgeniy Isakov	Russia	5.20	
?	?	Andrea Giannini	Italy	5.20	
?	?	Derek Miles	United States	5.20	
?	?	David Cardone	Australia	5.00	
?	?	Steven Levitzke	Australia	5.00	
?	?	Chen Yung-chih	Chinese Taipei	5.00	
?	?	Ketil Rønneberg	Norway	5.00	

=== Final ===
Rank	Athlete	Nationality	Result	Notes
1st place, gold medalist(s)	Khalid Lachheb	France	5.70	
2nd place, silver medalist(s)	Chad Harting	United States	5.60	
3rd place, bronze medalist(s)	Werner Holl	Germany	5.55	
4	Rens Blom	Netherlands	5.55	
5	Jurij Rovan	Slovenia	5.40	
6	Andrea Giannini	Italy	5.30	
6	Derek Miles	United States	5.30	
8	Nuno Fernandes	Portugal	5.30	
9	Jeff Hayhoe	Canada	5.30	
10	Oscar Janson	Sweden	5.30	
11	Yevgeniy Isakov	Russia	5.20	
	Fabio Pizzolato	Italy	NM	
