= Gérald Baudouin =

French pole vaulter

Gérald Baudouin (born 15 November 1972) is a retired French athlete who specialised in the pole vault. He represented his country at the 1993 World Championships without qualifying for the final. In addition, he won the gold medal at the 1994 Jeux de la Francophonie.

His personal bests in the event are 5.80 metres outdoor (Villeneuve d'Ascq 1994) and 5.65 metres indoors (Montreal 1994).

== Competition record ==
Year	Competition	Venue	Position	Notes
Representing France
1990	World Junior Championships	Plovdiv, Bulgaria	4th	5.30 m
1991	European Junior Championships	Thessaloniki, Greece	1st	5.50 m
1992	European Indoor Championships	Genoa, Italy	14th	5.30 m
1993	World Championships	Stuttgart, Germany	23rd (q)	5.45 m
1994	European Indoor Championships	Paris, France	9th	5.60 m
1994	Jeux de la Francophonie	Paris, France	1st	5.60 m
1994	European Championships	Helsinki, Finland	11th	5.60 m
1998	European Indoor Championships	Valencia, Spain	11th	5.30 m
