= Daniel Martí =

Spanish pole vaulter

Personal information
- Born: 23 April 1973 (age 53) Barcelona, Spain

Sport
- Sport: Track and field

Daniel Martí Lluch (born 23 April 1973) is a retired Spanish pole vaulter. His personal best jump was 5.70 metres, achieved in June 1994 in Lisbon.

== Achievements ==
Year	Competition	Venue	Position	Event	Notes
Representing Spain
1990	World Junior Championships	Plovdiv, Bulgaria	7th	Pole vault	5.20 m
1992	World Junior Championships	Seoul, South Korea	2nd	Pole vault	5.40 m
1993	World Indoor Championships	Toronto, Ontario, Canada	10th	Pole vault	5.50 m
1993	Mediterranean Games	Narbonne, France	–	Pole vault	NM
1993	Universiade	Buffalo, United States	8th	Pole vault	5.40 m
1993	World Championships	Stuttgart, Germany	4th (q)	Pole vault	5.65 m
1994	European Indoor Championships	Paris, France	10th	Pole vault	5.20 m
1994	European Championships	Helsinki, Finland	16th (q)	Pole vault	5.40 m
