= Bill Deering =

American pole vaulter

Personal information
- Born: William Deering Jr. July 20, 1971 (age 55)

Sport
- Country: United States
- Sport: Athletics
- Event: Pole vault
Medal record
Pan American Games
Silver medal – second place	1995 Mar del Plata	Pole vault

William Deering (born July 20, 1971) is an American former athlete who specialized in the pole vault.

A Michigan native, Deering learned pole vault from his father William Sr, a two-time state high school champion. They had a pole vault pit in their yard that he could practice in, using a pole his father had made out of sassafras trees.He is brother of Michigan State University pole vaulter Matt Deering. He attended the University of Miami, where he was an NCAA All-American twice and won five Big East Conference championships.

In 1995, he won a silver medal for the U.S. at the Pan American Games in Mar del Plata. He was also a finalist at the 1997 IAAF World Indoor Championships and finished fourth at the 1998 Goodwill Games.
