= Athletics at the 1995 Pan American Games – Men's pole vault =

Men's pole vault at the Pan American Games

The men's pole vault event at the 1995 Pan American Games was held at the Estadio Atletico "Justo Roman" on 18 March.

== Results ==
Rank	Name	Nationality	4.80	5.00	5.05	5.10	5.15	5.20	5.30	5.40	5.50	5.60	5.75	5.80	5.86	Result	Notes
1st place, gold medalist(s)	Pat Manson	United States	–	–	–	–	–	–	o	–	o	o	o	–	xxx	5.75	GR
2nd place, silver medalist(s)	Bill Deering	United States	–	–	–	–	–	–	o	–	o	o	x–	xx		5.60	
3rd place, bronze medalist(s)	Alberto Manzano	Cuba	–	–	–	–	–	xo	o	xo	xxx					5.40	
4	Paul Benavides	Mexico	–	–	–	–	–	xxo	o	xxx						5.30	
5	Owen Clements	Canada	xo	o	–	o	–	xxx								5.10	
6	Oscar Veit	Argentina	o	x–	o	–	xxx									5.05	
7	Cristián Aspillaga	Chile	o	o	–	xxx										5.00	
8	Fernando Pastoriza	Argentina	xo	o	–	xxx										5.00	
	Edgar Díaz	Puerto Rico	–	–	–	xxx										NM	
	Curtis Heywood	Canada	–	xxx												NM	
