= Lyubov Kremlyova =

Russian middle- and long-distance runner

Medal record

Women's athletics

Representing the Soviet Union

IAAF World Indoor Championships
Bronze medal – third place	1991 Seville	3000 m

Representing the Unified Team

European Athletics Indoor Championships
Silver medal – second place	1992 Genoa	1500 m

Lyubov Kremlyova (Russian: Любовь Кремлёва; born 21 December 1961) is a Russian former middle- and long-distance runner who competed internationally both for the Soviet Union and Russia. She had her greatest success indoors, winning medals at the 1991 IAAF World Indoor Championships and 1992 European Athletics Indoor Championships. She was stripped of a second World Indoor medal in 1995 after a positive test for steroids.

Kremlyova appeared three times at the European Athletics Championships and placed fourth in both 1990 and 1994. At the European Cup she was a three-time medallist, including a win in 1994. After her doping ban she ran as a pacemaker and competitively in road races. She continued to race into her forties and set a masters world record for women over-40 in the 3000 m.

She was a two-time Soviet indoor champion and a one-time Russian indoor champion. Her personal bests included 3:58.71 minutes for the 1500 metres and 8:46.94 minutes for the 3000 metres.

== Career ==
=== Early career ===
Born in the Russian SSR, Kremylova spent the majority of her twenties as one of the Soviet Union's second string of 1500 metres runners. Given the high standard of this event nationally, she regularly placed within the top twenty fastest of her discipline for those seasons, reaching a high of fifth in the 1986 season with a personal best of 4:01.57 minutes. At the Soviet Athletics Championships, she was third in 1989 and runner-up in 1990.

=== Indoor medals ===
She had her first title at national level came at the Soviet Indoor Athletics Championships in 1990, when she was the 3000 metres champion. In her international debut she finished fourth in the 3000 m at the 1990 European Athletics Championships, less than a second behind bronze medallist Roberta Brunet. She ranked eleventh on time for that event in 1990 and also ranked sixth in the 1500 m. She continued to focus on the 3000 m the following year and a defence of her Soviet indoor title brought her selection for the 1991 IAAF World Indoor Championships. This led to her first international medal – a bronze close behind Romania's Margareta Keszeg. Her time of 8:51.90 minutes placed her as the third fastest in the world indoors that year, after Keszeg and the world indoor champion Marie-Pierre Duros. Outdoors she was third at the 1991 European Cup, again beaten by Keszeg and also Germany's Uta Pippig.

After the 1991 season Kremlyova returned to the shorter middle-distance events. She continued to prove an adept indoor runner at the 1992 European Athletics Indoor Championships, claiming a silver medal in the 1500 m and losing to fellow former Soviet Yekaterina Podkopayeva by a margin of one hundredth of a second. Although she did not compete at the 1992 Summer Olympics, she was one of the most dominant athletes on the track and field circuit, coming a close second to Lyudmila Rogachova at the 1992 IAAF Grand Prix Final and ranking second on points in the 1500 m for the season. Her best performance that year was a win at the Weltklasse Zürich, where she won the 1500 m in a time of 3.58.71 minutes. This was a career best and her only sub-four minutes run for the distance. She also set a meeting record of 8:46.99 minutes for the 3000 m at the KBC Night of Athletics – a record which would last over two decades.

Kremlyova focused on the outdoor track in 1993 and managed second place over 800 metres at the 1993 European Cup (behind Romania's Ella Kovacs) and a win in the mile run at the 1993 IAAF Grand Prix Final, preventing Sonia O'Sullivan from taking a double. Although she was selected for the 1993 World Championships in Athletics, ultimately she did not compete. She topped the 1500 m podium at the 1994 European Cup, holding off Kelly Holmes. She was the second fastest qualifier at the 1994 European Athletics Championships, but the final was more tactical and she could only place fourth behind Holmes and her Russian teammates Rogachova and Podkopayeva. Her fastest run that year came on the circuit at the Herculis meeting, where she finished in 4:01.05 minutes as runner-up to Podkopayeva. This put her fourth on the seasonal rankings.

Kremlyova started the 1995 indoor season in top form with a world-leading time of 4:10.41 minutes for the 1500 m. In Erfurt in February she ran the second fastest ever 1000 metres indoors (behind only Inna Yevseyeva), However, she failed a drugs test for steroids at the meeting. While her sample was still subject to further analysis she was allowed to compete. At the 1995 IAAF World Indoor Championships she repeated her feat of four years earlier with a 1500 m bronze medal performance. Her "B" sample from Erfurt soon came positive, however, and she was banned for three and a half years and all her results from February onwards were annulled, leaving Maite Zúñiga as the retrospective world indoor bronze medallist.

=== Masters career ===
Kremlyova returned to competition in June 1998 and, moving up to the 5000 metres, showed she was still a force in the sport with a bronze medal at the Goodwill Games at the age of 36. She was running in the first age-group category for masters athletics. She was runner-up in the 3000 m at the 1999 Russian Indoor Athletics Championships, then represented her country in ekiden races in Beijing and Yokohama. She found herself the role of pacemaker on the IAAF Golden League circuit in 1999 and 2000, but still competed individually at national level during that period, including her first Russian title in the indoor 3000 m. Her final two international appearances for Russia were at the 2000 International Chiba Ekiden and the 2001 Yokohama Ekiden.

She continued to run competitively into her forties, with a particular focus on American road running competitions. Highlights included fourth-place finishes at the World's Best 10K and Cooper River Bridge Run in 2003 and two wins at the Reedy River Run. Into 2006 and 2007, as she passed her mid-forties, she still ranked within the top ten of major races such as the Cooper River Bridge Run, Azalea Trail Run and the Crescent City Classic. She also continued running in track races and in 2002 ran a world record for over-40 athletes in the 3000 m with a time of 9:02.83 minutes indoors.

== Personal bests ==
Outdoor

- 800 metres – 1:59.1 min (1986)
- 1000 metres – 2:33.55 min (1993)
- 1500 metres – 3:58.71 min (1992)
- Mile run – 4:22.46 min (1993)
- 3000 metres – 8:46.94 min (1990)
- 5000 metres – 15:36.58 min (1998)
- 10K run – 32:57 min (1998)
- 12-kilometre run – 40:24 min (2001)

Indoor

- 1000 metres – 2:34.84 min (1993)
- 1500 metres – 4:07.37 min (2000)
- Mile run – 4:29.72 min (2003)
- 2000 metres – 5:48.51 min (2003)
- 3000 metres – 8:51.40 min (2000)

All information from IAAF and ARRS

== National titles ==
- Soviet Indoor Athletics Championships
  - 3000 m: 1990, 1991
- Russian Indoor Athletics Championships
  - 3000 m: 2000

== International competitions ==
Year	Competition	Venue	Position	Event	Notes
Representing the Soviet Union
1990	European Championships	Split, Yugoslavia	4th	3000 m	8:46.94
1991	World Indoor Championships	Seville, Spain	—	1500 m	DNF
1991	World Indoor Championships	Seville, Spain	3rd	3000 m	8:51.90
1991	European Cup	Frankfurt, Germany	3rd	3000 m	8:49.72
Representing the Commonwealth of Independent States
1992	European Indoor Championships	Genoa, Italy	2nd	1500 m	4:06.62
1992	IAAF Grand Prix Final	Turin, Italy	2nd	1500 m	4:19.62
Representing Russia
1993	European Cup	Rome, Italy	2nd	800 m	1:59.8
1993	IAAF Grand Prix Final	London, United Kingdom	1st	Mile run	4:24.40
1994	European Cup	Birmingham, United Kingdom	1st	1500 m	4:05.97
1994	European Championships	Helsinki, Finland	4th	1500 m	4:19.77
1995	World Indoor Championships	Barcelona, Spain	DQ (2nd)	1500 m	4:13.19
1998	Goodwill Games	Uniondale, United States	3rd	5000 m	16:00.20
2000	European Indoor Championships	Ghent, Belgium	—	1500 m	DNF

== See also ==
- List of doping cases in athletics
