= István Bagyula =

Hungarian pole vaulter (born 1969)

Personal information
- Born: 2 January 1969 (age 57) Budapest, Hungary

Sport
- Sport: Track and field
Medal record
Representing Hungary
World Championships
Silver medal – second place	1991 Tokyo	Pole vault
Summer Universiade
Gold medal – first place	1991 Sheffield	Pole vault
Gold medal – first place	1993 Buffalo	Pole vault
Gold medal – first place	1995 Fukuoka	Pole vault
European Indoor Championships
Silver medal – second place	1992 Genoa	Pole vault

István Bagyula (born 2 January 1969) is a retired Hungarian pole vaulter.

Bagyula was born in Budapest and is a former world junior record holder, having equalled Radion Gataullin's 1984 record of 5.65 metres (18 ft 6 in) at the 1988 World Junior Championships. A new championship record at the time, it has not yet been beaten at the WJC. Mondo Duplantis is the world junior record holder with 6.05 metres (19 ft 10 in).

Bagyula competed for the George Mason Patriots track and field team, where he won an NCAA DI title in the pole vault.

== International competitions ==
Year	Competition	Venue	Position	Notes
Representing Hungary
1986	World Junior Championships	Athens, Greece	–	NH
1987	European Junior Championships	Birmingham, United Kingdom	2nd	5.30 m
1987	World Championships	Rome, Italy	19th (q)	5.00 m
1988	European Indoor Championships	Budapest, Hungary	14th	5.40 m
1988	World Junior Championships	Sudbury, Canada	1st	5.65 m (CR)
1988	Olympic Games	Seoul, South Korea	7th	5.60 m
1989	European Indoor Championships	The Hague, Netherlands	6th	5.60 m
1989	Universiade	Duisburg, West Germany	6th	5.30 m
1989	World Indoor Championships	Budapest, Hungary	6th	5.50 m
1990	European Indoor Championships	Glasgow, United Kingdom	5th	5.60 m
1990	European Championships	Split, Yugoslavia	10th	5.20 m
1991	Universiade	Sheffield, United Kingdom	1st	5.80 m UR
1991	World Championships	Tokyo, Japan	2nd	5.90 m
1992	European Indoor Championships	Genoa, Italy	2nd	5.80 m
1992	Olympic Games	Barcelona, Spain	9th	5.30 m
1993	Universiade	Buffalo, United States	1st	5.70 m
1993	World Championships	Stuttgart, Germany	10th	5.70 m
1994	European Indoor Championships	Paris, France	5th	5.70 m
1994	European Championships	Helsinki, Finland	10th	5.60 m
1995	World Indoor Championships	Barcelona, Spain	15th (q)	5.60 m
1995	World Championships	Gothenburg, Sweden	14th (q)	5.55 m
1995	Universiade	Fukuoka, Japan	1st	5.70 m
1997	World Indoor Championships	Paris, France	16th (q)	5.45 m
