= Athletics at the 1999 Pan American Games – Men's pole vault =

Men's pole vault at the Pan American Games

The men's pole vault event at the 1999 Pan American Games was held on July 27, 1999.

== Results ==
Rank	Name	Nationality	4.90	5.10	5.20	5.30	5.40	5.50	5.55	5.60	5.65	5.76	Result	Notes
1st place, gold medalist(s)	Pat Manson	United States	–	–	–	xxo	–	o	–	o	–	xxx	5.60	
2nd place, silver medalist(s)	Scott Hennig	United States	–	–	–	xo	–	xx–	o	–	xxx		5.55	
3rd place, bronze medalist(s)	Jason Pearce	Canada	–	–	xo	o	xxx						5.30	
4	Rob Pike	Canada	–	–	xxo	–	xxx						5.20	
5	Gustavo Rehder	Brazil	xo	xo	xxx								5.10	
5	Ricardo Diez	Venezuela	xo	xo	xxx								5.10	
7	Roger Borbón	Costa Rica	xo	xxx									4.90	
7	Robison Pratt	Mexico	xo	xxx									4.90	
	Edgar Díaz	Puerto Rico	–	–	–	xxx							NM	
	Dominic Johnson	Saint Lucia	–	–	xxx								NM	
