= Javier García (pole vaulter) =

Spanish pole vaulter (born 1966)

Personal information
- Born: July 22, 1966 (age 60) Barcelona, Spain

Sport
- Sport: Track and field
Medal record
Representing Spain
Olympic Games
Bronze medal – third place	1992 Barcelona	Pole vault
Summer Universiade
Bronze medal – third place	1989 Duisburg	Pole vault

Javier García Chico (born July 22, 1966) is a retired Spanish pole vaulter, who won the bronze medal at the 1992 Summer Olympics held in Barcelona, Spain after beating Kory Tarpenning. Four years earlier in Seoul he was eliminated in the qualifying round. He competed in four consecutive Summer Olympics.

His personal best jump was 5.75 metres, achieved in August 1990 in Sant Cugat. He had 5.77 metres on the indoor track, achieved in March 1992 in Grenoble.

== International competitions ==
Year	Competition	Venue	Position	Notes
Representing Spain
1985	European Junior Championships	Cottbus, East Germany	6th	5.20 m
1986	European Indoor Championships	Madrid, Spain	10th	5.15 m
1986	Ibero-American Championships	Havana, Cuba	2nd	5.20 m
1987	European Indoor Championships	Liévin, France	16th	5.30 m
1987	World Indoor Championships	Indianapolis, United States	11th	5.40 m
1988	Ibero-American Championships	Mexico City, Mexico	2nd	5.30 m A
1988	Olympic Games	Seoul, South Korea	–	NM
1989	European Indoor Championships	The Hague, Netherlands	10th	5.40 m
1989	World Indoor Championships	Budapest, Hungary	8th	5.50 m
1989	Universiade	Duisburg, West Germany	3rd	5.40 m
1989	World Cup	Barcelona, Spain	4th	5.50 m
1990	European Indoor Championships	Glasgow, United Kingdom	6th	5.60 m
1990	European Championships	Split, Yugoslavia	5th	5.70 m
1991	World Indoor Championships	Seville, Spain	7th	5.60 m
1991	World Championships	Tokyo, Japan	23rd (q)	5.30 m
1992	European Indoor Championships	Genoa, Italy	10th	5.50 m
1992	Olympic Games	Barcelona, Spain	3rd	5.75 m
1993	World Indoor Championships	Toronto, Canada	10th	5.50 m
1993	World Championships	Stuttgart, Germany	23rd (q)	5.45 m
1994	Goodwill Games	St. Petersburg, Russia	5th	5.60 m
1994	European Championships	Helsinki, Finland	19th (q)	5.40 m
1995	World Indoor Championships	Barcelona, Spain	7th	5.60 m
1995	World Championships	Gothenburg, Sweden	22nd (q)	5.40 m
1996	Olympic Games	Atlanta, United States	20th (q)	5.40 m
1997	World Indoor Championships	Paris, France	8th	5.55 m
1997	World Championships	Athens, Greece	–	NM
1998	European Indoor Championships	Valencia, Spain	5th	5.60 m
1998	Ibero-American Championships	Lisbon, Portugal	3rd	5.40 m
1999	World Championships	Seville, Spain	23rd (q)	5.40 m
2000	Olympic Games	Sydney, Australia	16th (q)	5.55 m
