= Denis Petushinskiy =

New Zealand pole vaulter of Russian descent

Denis Petushinskiy (Russian: Денис Петушинский; born 28 June 1967 in Irkutsk) is a retired pole vaulter who represented New Zealand after switching from Russia in 1998. He improved from 5.70 metres in 1992 to 5.90 metres in 1993 to win the Russian Championships. Later that year he finished sixth at the World Championships.

After becoming a New Zealand citizen, Petushinskiy originally won the silver medal at the 1998 Commonwealth Games with 5.55 metres, but was disqualified for testing positive to the banned drug Stanozolol, a type of steroid. His result would be a New Zealand record but was annulled.

== International competitions ==
Representing Russia
Year	Competition	Venue	Position	Notes
1993	World Championships	Stuttgart, Germany	6th	5.80 m
1994	European Indoor Championships	Paris, France	4th	5.75 m
1994	European Championships	Helsinki, Finland	5th	5.80 m

== See also ==
- List of doping cases in athletics
- List of eligibility transfers in athletics
