= Peter Widén =

Swedish pole vaulter

Peter Widén (born 2 July 1967 in Växjö) is a retired Swedish pole vaulter.

He set a national record of 5.75 metres at the 1991 World Championships in Tokyo. The record currently belongs to Armand Duplantis with 6.31 metres.

== Achievements ==
| Year | Competition | Venue | Position | Notes |
Representing Sweden
| 1986 | World Junior Championships | Athens, Greece | 1st (q) | 5.00 m |
| 1989 | European Indoor Championships | The Hague, Netherlands | 10th | 5.40 m |
| 1989 | World Indoor Championships | Budapest, Hungary | 10th | 5.40 m |
| 1990 | European Indoor Championships | Glasgow, United Kingdom | – | NM |
| 1990 | European Championships | Split, Yugoslavia | — | NM |
| 1991 | World Indoor Championships | Seville, Spain | 6th | 5.60 m |
| 1991 | World Championships | Tokyo, Japan | 5th | 5.75 m (NR) |
| 1992 | European Indoor Championships | Genoa, Italy | 5th | 5.60 m |
| 1992 | Olympic Games | Barcelona, Spain | 21st (q) | 5.40 m |
| 1993 | World Indoor Championships | Toronto, Canada | 18th (q) | 5.30 m |
| 1993 | World Championships | Stuttgart, Germany | 11th | 5.60 m |
| 1994 | European Indoor Championships | Paris, France | 1st (q) | 5.50 m |
| 1994 | European Championships | Helsinki, Finland | 13th (q) | 5.40 m |
| 1995 | World Indoor Championships | Barcelona, Spain | – | NM |
| 1995 | World Championships | Gothenburg, Sweden | 18th (q) | 5.40 m |
| 1996 | European Indoor Championships | Stockholm, Sweden | 4th | 5.70 m |
| 1997 | World Championships | Athens, Greece | 21st (q) | 5.45 m |
| 1998 | European Indoor Championships | Valencia, Spain | 20th (q) | 5.40 m |
