= Masters W40 3000 metres world record progression =

This is the progression of world record improvements of the 3000 metres W40 division of Masters athletics. Records must be set in properly conducted, official competitions under the standing IAAF rules unless modified by World Masters Athletics. The W40 division consists of female athletes who have reached the age of 40 but have not yet reached the age of 45, so exactly from their 40th birthday to the day before their 45th birthday.

Key

Incomplete information Pending better indoor records

Hand	Auto	Athlete	Nationality	Birthdate	Location	Date
	9:03.40	Nuria Fernández	Spain	16 August 1976	Lille	24 June 2017
	8:58.20i	Nuria Fernández	Spain	16 August 1976	Belgrade	3 March 2017
	9:04.60	Marina Ivanova	Russia	13 February 1962	Kazan	24 June 2005
9:11.2		Joyce Smith	United Kingdom	26 October 1937	London	30 April 1978
