= Grigoriy Yegorov =

Kazakhstani pole vaulter (born 1967)

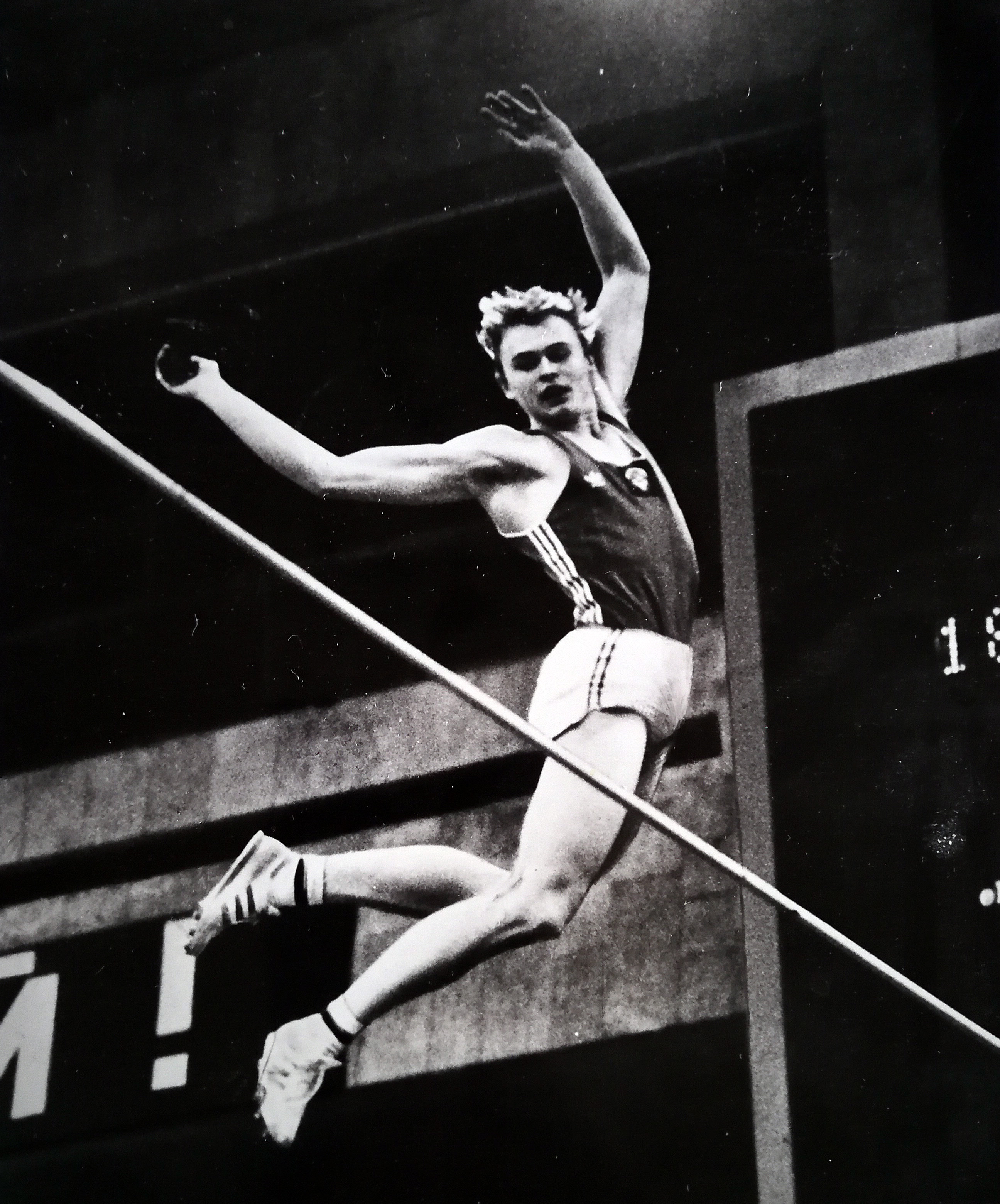

Medal record

Men's athletics

Representing Soviet Union

Olympic Games
Bronze medal – third place	1988 Seoul	Pole vault

World Indoor Championships
Silver medal – second place	1989 Budapest	Pole vault

European Championships
Silver medal – second place	1990 Split	Pole vault

European Indoor Championships
Gold medal – first place	1989 The Hague	Pole vault
Silver medal – second place	1990 Glasgow	Pole vault

Representing Kazakhstan

World Championships
Silver medal – second place	1993 Stuttgart	Pole vault

World Indoor Championships
Silver medal – second place	1993 Toronto	Pole vault

Asian Championships
Gold medal – first place	1993 Manila	Pole vault
Gold medal – first place	2003 Manila	Pole vault
Bronze medal – third place	2002 Colombo	Pole vault

Grigoriy Aleksandrovich Yegorov (Russian: Григорий Александрович Егоров, born January 12, 1967, in Shymkent) is a pole vault athlete from the former USSR. After the dissolution of the Soviet Union, he became citizen of Kazakhstan. In 1996 he moved to the Alicante province in Spain. He got the Spanish nationality in 2012. He is currently representing Spain in World Master Championships.

== Biography ==
Yegorov trained at Dynamo in Alma-Ata. He won the 1988 Olympic bronze medal (competing for the USSR), two World Indoor silver medals, and finished second at the 1993 World Championships in Athletics with a personal best jump of 5.90 metres. His last international medal came at the 2003 Asian Championships, jumping 5.40 metres.

== Competition record ==
Year	Competition	Venue	Position	Notes
Representing the Soviet Union
1985	European Junior Championships	Cottbus, East Germany	2nd	5.40 m
1986	World Junior Championships	Athens, Greece	5th	5.20 m
1988	Olympic Games	Seoul, South Korea	3rd	5.80 m
1989	European Indoor Championships	The Hague, Netherlands	1st	5.75 m
1989	World Indoor Championships	Budapest, Hungary	2nd	5.80 m
1990	European Indoor Championships	Glasgow, United Kingdom	2nd	5.75 m
1990	Goodwill Games	Seattle, United States	2nd	5.87 m
1990	European Championships	Split, Yugoslavia	2nd	5.75 m
Representing Kazakhstan
1993	World Indoor Championships	Toronto, Canada	2nd	5.80 m
1993	World Championships	Stuttgart, Germany	2nd	5.90 (AR)
1993	Asian Championships	Manila, Philippines	1st	5.70 m
1994	Asian Games	Hiroshima, Japan	2nd	5.50 m
1995	World Championships	Gothenburg, Sweden	–	NM
2002	Asian Championships	Colombo, Sri Lanka	3rd	5.20 m
2002	Asian Games	Busan, South Korea	1st	5.40 m
2003	Asian Championships	Manila, Philippines	1st	5.40 m
2003	Afro-Asian Games	Hyderabad, India	1st	5.25 m
2004	Olympic Games	Athens, Greece	–	NM
