= Edgar Díaz =

Edgar Díaz may refer to:

- Edgar Díaz (pole vaulter)
- Edgar Díaz (baseball)
