= Enzo Brichese =

Italian pole vaulter

Personal information
- Nationality: Italian
- Born: November 17, 1965 (age 60) Rome, Italy

Sport
- Country: Italy
- Sport: Athletics
- Event: Pole vault

Achievements and titles
- Personal bests: Pole vault: 5.50 m(1988); Long jump: 7.90 m (1990)

Enzo Brichese (Rome, 17 November 1965) is a former Italian pole vaulter and long jumper and currently the coach of the Italian pole vaulter Sonia Malavisi.

== Biography ==
Brichese has won the individual national championship 2 times. He jumped his personal best (5,60 m) in a town square event in Chiari on 15 June 1991.

== National titles ==
- 2 wins in the pole vault at the Italian Athletics Indoor Championships (1988, 1989)

== See also ==
- Sonia Malavisi
