= Athletics at the 1992 Arab Games =

Athletics at the 1992 Pan Arab Games

1992 Pan Arab Games

- Syria, Damascus
- September 4–18

== Men ==
=== 100m ===
MEDAL	ATHLETE	DOB	COUNTRY	MARK	W/I	RECORD	NOTES
	Talal Mansour	1964	QAT	10.53	-2.1		
	Driss Bensaddou	1967	MAR	10.73	-2.1		
	Khalid Jouma Ibrahim	1962	BRN	10.84	-2.1		

=== 200m ===
MEDAL	ATHLETE	DOB	COUNTRY	MARK	W/I	RECORD	NOTES
	Talal Mansour	1964	QAT	20.62	1.5	CR	
	Ibrahim Ismail Muftah	1972	QAT	20.85	1.5		
	Mohamed El Kandoussi	1968	MAR	21.23	1.5		

=== 400m ===
MEDAL	ATHLETE	DOB	COUNTRY	MARK	W/I	RECORD	NOTES
	Ibrahim Ismail Muftah	1972	QAT	44.89		CR	
	Benyounes Lahlou	1964	MAR	45.03			
	Habib Dhouibi	1963	TUN	46.10			

=== 800m ===
MEDAL	ATHLETE	DOB	COUNTRY	MARK	W/I	RECORD	NOTES
	Mahjoub Haida	1970	MAR	1:46.71		CR	
	Jihad El Balaoui	1969	JOR	1:48.26			
	Riad Gatte	1971	ALG	1:48.74			

=== 1500m ===
MEDAL	ATHLETE	DOB	COUNTRY	MARK	W/I	RECORD	NOTES
	Mohammed Sulaiman	1969	QAT	3:40.1			
	Mahmoud Kalboussi	1965	TUN	3:41.1			
	Mohamed Taki		MAR	3:41.6			

=== 5000m ===
MEDAL	ATHLETE	DOB	COUNTRY	MARK	W/I	RECORD	NOTES
	Mohammed Sulaiman	1969	QAT	13:53.13		CR	
	Salah Hissou	1972	MAR	13:56.32			
	Alyan Sultan Al-Qahtani	1971	KSA	14:01.43			

=== 10,000m ===
MEDAL	ATHLETE	DOB	COUNTRY	MARK	W/I	RECORD	NOTES
	Salah Hissou	1972	MAR	29:23.0			
	Mokhtar Hizaoui		TUN	29:53.7			
	Khalid Khannouchi	1971	MAR	30:19.4			

=== Marathon ===
MEDAL	ATHLETE	DOB	COUNTRY	MARK	W/I	RECORD	NOTES
	Tahar Mansouri	1965	TUN	2:21:52			
	Ahmed El Hamshari		JOR	2:33:58			
	Moussa El Hariri	1966	SYR	2:35:29			

=== 3000SC ===
MEDAL	ATHLETE	DOB	COUNTRY	MARK	W/I	RECORD	NOTES
	Mohammed Barak Al-Dosari	1961	KSA	8:40.7			
	Saleh Mustapha Habib		SYR	8:41.5			
	Elarbi Khattabi	1967	MAR	8:42.5			

=== 110H ===
MEDAL	ATHLETE	DOB	COUNTRY	MARK	W/I	RECORD	NOTES
	Noureddine Tadjine	1963	ALG	13.89		CR	
	Ziad Abdulrazzaq Khuder	1969	KUW	14.05			
	Khayreddine Obeid	1966	SYR	14.12			

=== 400H ===
MEDAL	ATHLETE	DOB	COUNTRY	MARK	W/I	RECORD	NOTES
	Ziad Abou Hamed	1970	SYR	49.39		CR	
	Fadhel Khayati	1965	TUN	50.2			
	Suleiman Houielah	1967	SYR	50.4			

=== HJ ===
MEDAL	ATHLETE	DOB	COUNTRY	MARK	W/I	RECORD	NOTES
	Othmane Belfaa	1961	ALG	2.18		CR	
	Abdullah Al-Sheib	1965	QAT	2.18			
	Yacine Mousli	1967	ALG	2.15			

=== PV ===
MEDAL	ATHLETE	DOB	COUNTRY	MARK	W/I	RECORD	NOTES
	Waleed Zayed Al-Shamali	1967	QAT	5.15		CR	
	Samir Agsous	1967	ALG	5.10			
	Sami Si Mohamed	1966	ALG	5.00			

=== LJ ===
MEDAL	ATHLETE	DOB	COUNTRY	MARK	W/I	RECORD	NOTES
	Lotfi Khaida	1968	ALG	7.97		CR	
	Ahmed Sayed	1968	YEM	7.79			
	Abdullah Al-Sheib	1965	QAT	7.44			

=== TJ ===
MEDAL	ATHLETE	DOB	COUNTRY	MARK	W/I	RECORD	NOTES
	Marzouk Abdullah Al-Yoha	1968	KUW	16.44		CR	
	Lotfi Khaida	1968	ALG	16.41			
	Sameh Farhan		KUW	16.13			

=== SP ===
MEDAL	ATHLETE	DOB	COUNTRY	MARK	W/I	RECORD	NOTES
	Bilal Saad Mubarak	1972	QAT	17.68		CR	
	Khalid Salman Al-Khalidi	1965	KSA	17.00			
	Khalid Fatihi		MAR	16.82			

=== DT ===
MEDAL	ATHLETE	DOB	COUNTRY	MARK	W/I	RECORD	NOTES
	Khalid Salman Al-Khalidi	1965	KSA	53.30			
	Ibrahim Mohamed Al-Obeidan	1962	KSA	50.60			
	Khalid Fatihi		MAR	50.56			

=== HT ===
MEDAL	ATHLETE	DOB	COUNTRY	MARK	W/I	RECORD	NOTES
	Hakim Toumi	1961	ALG	68.52		CR	
	Sherif Farouk El Hennawi	1972	EGY	66.52			
	Walid Saleh Al-Bekhit	1965	KUW	65.60			

=== JT ===
MEDAL	ATHLETE	DOB	COUNTRY	MARK	W/I	RECORD	NOTES
	Ghanem Mabrouk Zaid Johar	1965	KUW	70.42		CR	
	Abdelazim Aliouat	1967	KSA	69.86			
	Maher Ridane	1971	TUN	67.94			

=== 20kmW ===
MEDAL	ATHLETE	DOB	COUNTRY	MARK	W/I	RECORD	NOTES
	Abdelwahab Ferguene	1958	ALG	1:35:26			
	Moussa Aouanouk	1972	ALG	1:36:50			
	Ahmed Abdelhamid (1969)		EGY	1:45:25			

=== Decathlon ===
MEDAL	ATHLETE	DOB	COUNTRY	MARK	W/I	RECORD	NOTES
	Sid Ali Sabour		ALG	6820			
	Assam Mohamed Al-Hizam	1972	KSA	6363			
	Hassan Farouk Sayed (1970)		EGY	6352			

=== 4x100m ===
MEDAL	ATHLETE	DOB	COUNTRY	MARK	W/I	RECORD	NOTES
	-		QAT	39.60		CR	
	-		QAT	39.60		CR	
	Ibrahim Ismail Muftah	1972	QAT	39.60		CR	
	Talal Mansour	1964	QAT	39.60		CR	
	Mohamed El Kandoussi	1968	MAR	39.61		NR	
	M. Moudamane		MAR	39.61		NR	
	Driss Bensaddou	1967	MAR	39.61		NR	
	Abdelkader El Boukhari		MAR	39.61		NR	
	Ziad Abdulrazzaq Khuder	1969	KUW	40.04			
	-		KUW	40.04			
	-		KUW	40.04			
	-		KUW	40.04			

=== 4x400m ===
MEDAL	ATHLETE	DOB	COUNTRY	MARK	W/I	RECORD	NOTES
	-		MAR	3:05.01		CR	
	Abdelkader El Boukhari		MAR	3:05.01		CR	
	-		MAR	3:05.01		CR	
	Benyounes Lahlou	1964	MAR	3:05.01		CR	
	-		QAT	3:07.45			
	-		QAT	3:07.45			
	-		QAT	3:07.45			
	-		QAT	3:07.45			
	Hadi Soua'an Al-Somaily	1976	KSA	3:08.35			
	-		KSA	3:08.35			
	-		KSA	3:08.35			
	Mohammed Hamed Al-Bishi	1975	KSA	3:08.35			

== Women ==
=== 100m ===
MEDAL	ATHLETE	DOB	COUNTRY	MARK	W/I	RECORD	NOTES
	Nezha Bidouane	1969	MAR	12.27	-2.5		
	Latifa Lahcen		MAR	12.41	-2.5		
	Karima Miskin Saad	1969	EGY	12.46	-2.5		

=== 200m ===
MEDAL	ATHLETE	DOB	COUNTRY	MARK	W/I	RECORD	NOTES
	Nezha Bidouane	1969	MAR	24.26	nwi		
	Karima Miskin Saad	1969	EGY	24.39	nwi		
	Nadia Abdou		ALG	24.67	nwi		

=== 400m ===
MEDAL	ATHLETE	DOB	COUNTRY	MARK	W/I	RECORD	NOTES
	Nezha Bidouane	1969	MAR	54.32			
	Karima Miskin Saad	1969	EGY	54.40			
	Nadia Zetouani	1970	MAR	55.49			

=== 800m ===
MEDAL	ATHLETE	DOB	COUNTRY	MARK	W/I	RECORD	NOTES
	Najat Ouali	1972	MAR	2:09.14			
	Alia Al-Matari		JOR	2:18.78			
	Mirvat Baas		SYR	2:23.12			

=== 1500m ===
MEDAL	ATHLETE	DOB	COUNTRY	MARK	W/I	RECORD	NOTES
	Hassiba Boulmerka	1968	ALG	4:17.8			
	Najat Ouali	1972	MAR	4:32.4			
	Alia Al-Matari		JOR	4:49.7			

=== 3000m ===
MEDAL	ATHLETE	DOB	COUNTRY	MARK	W/I	RECORD	NOTES
	Zahra Ouaziz	1969	MAR	9:39.57			
	Sonia Agoun	1967	TUN	9:56.18			
	Mubaraka Al Hajj Abdallah		ALG	10:04.44			

=== 10,000m ===
MEDAL	ATHLETE	DOB	COUNTRY	MARK	W/I	RECORD	NOTES
	Zahra Ouaziz	1969	MAR	37:58.07			
	Mubaraka Al Hajj Abdallah		ALG	39:00.47			
	Sonia Agoun	1967	TUN	39:06.54			

=== 100H ===
MEDAL	ATHLETE	DOB	COUNTRY	MARK	W/I	RECORD	NOTES
	Nezha Bidouane	1969	MAR	14.97	nwi		
	Huda Hashem Ismail	1968	EGY	15.23	nwi		
	Amel Baraket	1970	ALG	15.87	nwi		

=== 400H ===
MEDAL	ATHLETE	DOB	COUNTRY	MARK	W/I	RECORD	NOTES
	Nezha Bidouane	1969	MAR	57.2		CR	
	Nadia Zetouani	1970	MAR	57.7			
	Hind Kabaoiu	1969	TUN	1:00.0			

=== HJ ===
MEDAL	ATHLETE	DOB	COUNTRY	MARK	W/I	RECORD	NOTES
	Souad Haddad		JOR	1.69		CR	
	Ghada Shouaa	1972	SYR	1.66			
	Hala Al-Saka		SYR	1.60			

=== LJ ===
MEDAL	ATHLETE	DOB	COUNTRY	MARK	W/I	RECORD	NOTES
	Ghada Shouaa	1972	SYR	6.22		CR	
	Hind Kabaoiu	1969	TUN	5.91			
	Nadia Abdou		ALG	5.71			

=== SP ===
MEDAL	ATHLETE	DOB	COUNTRY	MARK	W/I	RECORD	NOTES
	Fouzia Fatihi	1970	MAR	15.59		CR	
	Hanan Ahmed Khaled	1968	EGY	14.32			
	Lamia Naouara	1969	TUN	14.24		NR	

=== DT ===
MEDAL	ATHLETE	DOB	COUNTRY	MARK	W/I	RECORD	NOTES
	Zoubaida Laayouni	1956	MAR	54.34		CR	
	Monia Kari	1971	TUN	50.90			
	Nabila Mouelhi	1966	TUN	50.60			

=== JT ===
MEDAL	ATHLETE	DOB	COUNTRY	MARK	W/I	RECORD	NOTES
	Ghada Shouaa	1972	SYR	53.24		CR	
	Fatma Zouhour Toumi	1971	TUN	48.82			
	Fidela Khoury		SYR	46.38			

=== 10kmW ===
MEDAL	ATHLETE	DOB	COUNTRY	MARK	W/I	RECORD	NOTES
	Dounia Kara-Hassoun	1972	ALG	55:29			
	Randa Saadin		SYR	1:04:01			
	Ibtissam Zaouam		SYR	1:06:06			

=== Heptathlon ===
MEDAL	ATHLETE	DOB	COUNTRY	MARK	W/I	RECORD	NOTES
	Ghada Shouaa	1972	SYR	5508	pts	CR	
	Huda Hashem Ismail	1968	EGY	4446	pts		
	Hala Al-Saka		SYR	4026	pts		

=== 4x100m ===
MEDAL	ATHLETE	DOB	COUNTRY	MARK	W/I	RECORD	NOTES
	-		MAR	46.30			
	-		MAR	46.30			
	Latifa Lahcen		MAR	46.30			
	Nezha Bidouane	1969	MAR	46.30			
	-		SYR	48.90			
	-		SYR	48.90			
	-		SYR	48.90			
	Ghada Shouaa	1972	SYR	48.90			
	-		JOR	53.31			
	-		JOR	53.31			
	-		JOR	53.31			
	-		JOR	53.31			

=== 4x400m ===
MEDAL	ATHLETE	DOB	COUNTRY	MARK	W/I	RECORD	NOTES
	-		MAR	3:45.47			
	-		MAR	3:45.47			
	Nadia Zetouani	1970	MAR	3:45.47			
	Nezha Bidouane	1969	MAR	3:45.47			
	-		ALG	3:56.44			
	-		ALG	3:56.44			
	-		ALG	3:56.44			
	-		ALG	3:56.44			
	Imtitlal Daa'bes		JOR	4:01.28		NR	
	Montaha Al-Majali		JOR	4:01.28		NR	
	Alia Al-Matari		JOR	4:01.28		NR	
	Souad Haddad		JOR	4:01.28		NR	
