= Massimo Allevi =

Italian pole vaulter

Massimo Maria Allevi
Personal information
- Nationality: Italian
- Born: November 23, 1969 (age 56) Ascoli Piceno, Italy

Sport
- Country: Italy
- Sport: Athletics
- Event: Pole vault
- Club: G.S. Fiamme Azzurre

Achievements and titles
- Personal bests: Pole vault outdoor: 5.60 (1996); Pole vault indoor: 5.60 (1996)

Massimo Maria Allevi (born 23 November 1969, in Ascoli Piceno) is a former Italian pole vaulter.

== Biography ==
Massimo Allevi has won 3 times the individual national championship. He was the gold medallist at the 2001 World Military Track and Field Championships in Beirut.

== National titles ==
- 1 win in the pole vault (1993) at the Italian Athletics Championships
- 2 wins in the pole vault (1992, 2000) at the Italian Athletics Indoor Championships

== See also ==
- Italian all-time lists - Pole vault
