= Bill Payne (athlete) =

American pole vaulter

Personal information
- Born: 21 December 1967 (age 58) Joshua, Texas, United States

Sport
- Sport: Track and field
Medal record
Representing United States
Summer Universiade
Silver medal – second place	1991 Sheffield	Pole vault

Bill Payne (born 21 December 1967) is a retired American pole vaulter.

He won the silver medal at the 1991 Summer Universiade, and competed at the 1995 World Championships without reaching the final.

Payne competed for the Baylor Bears track and field team in the NCAA. In 1990, he was suspended for three months after testing positive for a banned substance.

His personal best is 5.86 metres, achieved in May 1991 in Houston. This result secures him a place on the all-time list in pole vault, and places him thirteenth on the American all-time list behind Jeff Hartwig, Timothy Mack, Toby Stevenson, Brad Walker, Lawrence Johnson, Scott Huffman, Joe Dial, Dean Starkey, Jacob Davis, Nick Hysong, Kory Tarpenning and Earl Bell.

He is married with four children. His daughter, Demi Payne, is also a pole vaulter, one of the top ten female vaulters in history.
