= Delko Lesev =

Bulgarian pole vaulter

Delko Lesev (Bulgarian: Делко Лесев; born 6 January 1967, died 26 October 2023) was a Bulgarian pole vaulter.

His personal best jump was 5.70 metres, achieved in June 1991 in Plovdiv. This ranks him fourth among Bulgarian pole vaulters, behind Spas Bukhalov, Atanas Tarev, Nikolay Nikolov, and joint with Stanimir Penchev and Iliyan Efremov.

== Achievements ==
Year	Competition	Venue	Position	Notes
Representing Bulgaria
1986	World Junior Championships	Athens, Greece	2nd	5.40 m
1987	World Championships	Rome, Italy	7th	5.60 m
1988	European Indoor Championships	Budapest, Hungary	15th	5.40 m
1989	World Indoor Championships	Budapest, Hungary	12th	5.30 m
1990	European Indoor Championships	Glasgow, United Kingdom	—	NM
1991	World Indoor Championships	Seville, Spain	10th	5.50 m
1992	European Indoor Championships	Genoa, Italy	—	NM
