= William Kemei =

Kenyan middle-distance runner

William Kemei (22 February 1969 – 20 December 2007) was a Kenyan middle-distance runner who won the 1500 metres race at the 1991 All-Africa Games. In 1992 he set Kenyan records for 1500 m and one mile.

His greatest achievement was the victory in the Mile race at the ISTAF meeting in Berlin 1992 where he defeated the 1500 m world champion Noureddine Morceli, and remained undefeated until 1996. Kemei finished that race in 3:48.80 min, Morceli clocked 3:49.79. His time was a Kenyan record.

He died on 20 December 2007 at his home in Baraton, Nandi County.
