= Igor Trandenkov =

Russian pole vaulter

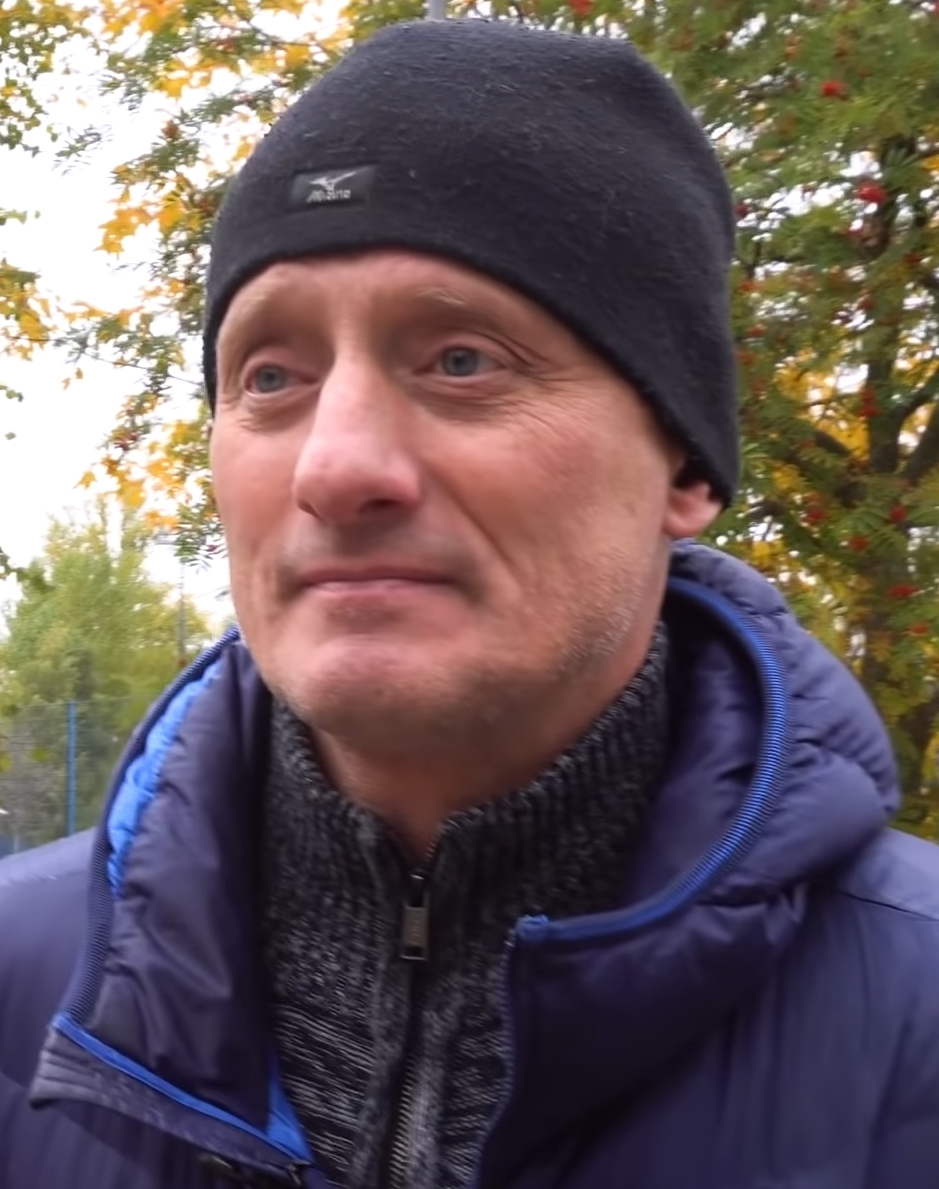
- Igor Trandenkov in October 2019

Personal information
- Native name: Игоръ Леонидович Транденков
- Full name: Igor Leonidovich Trandenkov
- Nationality: Russian
- Born: August 17, 1966 (age 59) Leningrad, Russian SFSR, Soviet Union
- Height: 1.91 m (6 ft 3 in)
- Weight: 80 kg (176 lb)
- Spouse: Marina Trandenkova

Sport
- Country: Russia (1993-1999)
- Sport: Men's athletics
- Event: Pole vault
- Club: CSKA Moscow

Achievements and titles
- Personal best: 6.01 m (1996)
Medal record
Men's athletics
Representing Unified Team
Olympic Games
Silver medal – second place	1992 Barcelona	Pole vault
Representing Russia
Olympic Games
Silver medal – second place	1996 Atlanta	Pole vault
World Championships
Bronze medal – third place	1993 Stuttgart	Pole vault
European Championships
Silver medal – second place	1994 Helsinki	Pole vault
European Indoor Championships
Bronze medal – third place	1994 Paris	Pole vault

Igor Leonidovich Trandenkov (Russian: Игорь Леоңидович Транденков, born August 17, 1966, in Leningrad) is a retired Russian pole vaulter best known for winning two Olympic silver medals. His personal best jump of 6.01 m makes him a part of the so-called 6 metres club.

He is married to Russian athlete, Marina Trandenkova.

== International competitions ==
Year	Competition	Venue	Position	Notes
Representing Unified Team
1992	Summer Olympics	Barcelona, Spain	2nd	5.80 m
Representing Russia
1993	World Championships	Stuttgart, Germany	3rd	5.80 m
1994	European Championships	Helsinki, Finland	2nd	5.90 m
1996	Summer Olympics	Atlanta, United States	2nd	5.92 m
1996	IAAF Grand Prix Final	Milan, Italy	3rd	5.80 m
