= Andrea Pegoraro =

Italian pole vaulter

Personal information
- Nationality: Italian
- Born: 24 October 1966 (age 59) Camposampiero, Italy
- Height: 1.86 m (6 ft 1 in)
- Weight: 74 kg (163 lb)

Sport
- Country: Italy
- Sport: Athletics
- Event: Pole vault
- Club: C.S. Carabinieri

Achievements and titles
- Personal bests: Pole vault outdoor: 5.65 (1992); Pole vault indoor: 5.65 (1993)

Andrea Pegoraro (born 24 October 1966 in Camposampiero) is a former Italian pole vaulter.

== Biography ==
Andrea Pegoraro participated in one edition of the Summer Olympics (1992) and one of the World Championships in Athletics (1993). He has won 4 times the individual national championship.

== Achievements ==
Year	Competition	Venue	Position	Event	Performance	Notes
1992	Summer Olympics	(Spain) Barcelona	QUAL	Pole vault	5.40 m	
1993	World Championships	(Germany) Stuttgart	QUAL	Pole vault	5.65 m	

== National titles ==
- 2 wins in the pole vault (1994, 1995) at the Italian Athletics Championships
- 2 wins in the pole vault (1990, 1993) at the Italian Athletics Indoor Championships

== See also ==
- Italian all-time lists - Pole vault
