= Pyotr Bochkaryov =

Russian pole vaulter

Personal information
- Born: November 3, 1967 (age 58) Moscow, Soviet Union

Sport
- Sport: Track and field
Medal record
Representing Soviet Union
European Indoor Championships
Gold medal – first place	1992 Genoa	Pole vault
Summer Universiade
Bronze medal – third place	1991 Sheffield	Pole vault
Representing Russia
European Indoor Championships
Gold medal – first place	1994 Paris	Pole vault
Bronze medal – third place	1996 Stockholm	Pole vault

Pyotr Bochkaryov (Russian: Петр Бочкарев; born November 3, 1967) is a retired Russian pole vaulter. He won the European Indoor Championships twice, setting an indoor personal best in 1994 with 5.90 metres. This remained the championship record until Renaud Lavillenie cleared 6.03 m in 2011. He placed 5th at the 1996 Summer Olympics with a jump of 5.86 m, his best outdoor result apart from a 5.90 m jump in a city square competition at Karlskrona.

== Achievements ==
Year	Competition	Venue	Position	Notes
Representing Unified Team
1992	European Indoor Championships	Genoa, Italy	1st	
Representing Russia
1994	European Indoor Championships	Paris, France	1st	5.90, CR and PB
1996	European Indoor Championships	Stockholm, Sweden	3rd	
1996	Olympic Games	Atlanta, United States	5th	
