= Valeri Bukrejev =

Estonian pole vaulter

Valeri Bukrejev (born June 15, 1964, in Tallinn) is a retired Estonian pole vaulter.

He finished seventh at the 1993 World Championships, eighth at the 1994 European Indoor Championships in a new Estonian indoor record of 5.60 metres and fourth at the 1994 Goodwill Games. He renewed Estonian indoor record in March 1995 in Kuopio, which is also the current Estonian indoor record.

His personal best is 5.86 metres, achieved in July 1994 in Somero. This is the current Estonian record.
