= Doug Wood (pole vaulter) =

Canadian pole vaulter

Personal information
- Born: January 30, 1966 (age 60) Wingham, Ontario
Medal record
Men's Athletics
Representing Canada
Pan American Games
Silver medal – second place	1991 Havana	Pole Vault

Douglas "Doug" Kenneth Wood (born January 30, 1966) is a retired male pole vaulter from Canada, who represented his native country in the men's pole vault event at the 1992 Summer Olympics. He failed to reach the final, reaching 5.20 metres in the qualification group.

In 2025 he was inducted into the Caledon Sports Hall of Fame.

== See also ==
- Canadian records in track and field
