= Simon Arkell =

Australian pole vaulter (born 1966)

Simon Arkell OLY
Personal information
- Born: 1 July 1966 (age 60) Maidenhead, England
- Education: University of New Mexico '91; California Polytechnic State University, San Luis Obispo MBA
- Height: 185 cm (6 ft 1 in)
- Weight: 78 kg (172 lb)

Sport
- Sport: Athletics
- Event: Pole vault
- Club: SPOC

Achievements and titles
- Personal best: 5.80 m (1996)
Medal record
Representing Australia
Commonwealth Games
Gold medal – first place	1990 Auckland	Pole vault

Simon Graham Arkell (born 1 July 1966) is an Olympic pole vaulter from Australia, who competed in two consecutive Summer Olympics, starting in 1992.

== Biography ==
During his career he was Commonwealth Champion, NCAA All-American (5 times), WAC Conference Champion (7 times) and broke 9 Australian and 4 Commonwealth records. He was also Australian (3) and British (2) Champion, was 1993 Australian Athlete of the Year and is in the Athletics Hall of Fame for the State of South Australia and the University of New Mexico, USA. After his athletic career Arkell went on to co-found Versifi Technologies, Predixion Software and Deep Lens, an oncology-focused clinical trial matching software company that uses artificial intelligence to match cancer patient to clinical trials. Deep Lens was backed by venture capital firms Northpond Ventures, Sierra Ventures, Rev1 and Tamarind Hill Fund and was acquired in May 2022 by Paradigm Health in an all-cash deal. He is co-founder and CEO of Ryght, an early stage AI software company focused on the biopharma industry, and he is a seed stage investor and board member.

In 2026 Arkell became the chairman of the Australian Olympic Committee's "Olympic Executive Club" in Los Angeles to raise the profiles of, and support for, Australian Olympians at the 2028 Los Angeles and 2032 Brisbane Olympic Games.

Arkell twice won the British AAA Championships title in the pole vault event at the 1988 AAA Championships and the 1993 AAA Championships.

== Achievements ==
Year	Tournament	Venue	Result	Extra
1986	Commonwealth Games	Edinburgh, Scotland	7th	4.75 m
1987	Summer Universiade	Zagreb, Yugoslavia	9th	5.40 m
1988	British 1988 AAA Championships	Birmingham, England	1st	5.10 m
1989	Australian Athletics Championships	Brisbane, Australia	1st	5.40 m
1989	1989 IAAF World Cup	Barcelona, Spain	5th	5.45 m
1989	Summer Universiade	Duisburg, West Germany	4th	5.40 m
1990	IAAF Grand Prix	Aarhus, Denmark	2nd	5.61 m NR
1990	Commonwealth Games	Auckland, New Zealand	1st	5.35 m
1991	Summer Universiade	Sheffield, England	7th	5.40 m
1991	Australian Domestic	Perth, Australia	1st	5.70 m CR
1991	World Championships	Tokyo, Japan	17th	5.40 m
1992	Olympic Games	Barcelona, Spain	22nd	5.30 m
1993	Australian Grand Prix	Adelaide, Australia	1st	5.72 m NR
1993	World Indoor Championships	Toronto, Canada	17th	5.30 m
1993	British 1993 AAA Championships	Birmingham, England	1st	5.60 m
1993	World Championships	Stuttgart, Germany	22nd	5.45 m
1995	Australian Grand Prix	Adelaide, Australia	1st	5.73 m NR
1995	World Championships	Gothenburg, Sweden	20th	5.40 m
1996	Australian Grand Prix	Perth, Australia	1st	5.75 m NR
1996	1996 IAAF Grand Prix	Adelaide, Australia	1st	5.80 m NR
1996	Olympic Games	Atlanta, United States	NHC	—
