= Jani Lehtonen =

Finnish pole vaulter

Jani Valdemar Lehtonen
Personal information
- Full name: Jani Valdemar Lehtonen
- Nationality: Finnish
- Born: August 11, 1968 Mäntsälä, Finland
- Died: December 21, 2008 Tampere, Finland

Sport
- Sport: Athletics
- Event: Pole vault

Achievements and titles
- Olympic finals: 1992
- Personal bests: 5.82 m (19.1 ft) (outdoor); 5.83 m (19.1 ft) (indoor)

Jani Valdemar Lehtonen (11 August 1968 – 21 December 2008) was a Finnish pole vaulter. He was born in Mäntsälä and died in Tampere. He finished eleventh at the 1990 European Championships, eighth at the 1992 European Indoor Championships and fifth at the 1993 World Indoor Championships, His personal best vault was 5.82 metres, achieved in June 1993 in Kuortane. This is the current Finnish record. Lehtonen committed suicide in 2008.
