= Gianni Iapichino =

Italian pole vaulter and coach

Personal information
- Nationality: Italian
- Born: March 2, 1969 (age 57) Columbus, Ohio, U.S.
- Height: 1.87 m (6 ft 1 1/2 in)
- Weight: 80 kg (180 lb)

Sport
- Country: Italy
- Sport: Athletics
- Event: Pole vault
- Club: ASSI Giglio Rosso; G.S. Fiamme Oro

Achievements and titles
- Personal bests: Pole vault outdoor: 5.70 m (1994); Pole vault outdoor: 5.60 m (1992); Long jump outdoor: 7.95 m (1993); Heptathlon indoor: 5866 pts (1996)
Medal record
European Cup
Silver medal – second place	1991 Frankfurt	Pole vault

Gianni Iapichino (born March 2, 1969) is an Italian athletics coach and former pole vaulter, long jumper and heptathlete.

== Biography ==
Iapichino finished second behind Tim Bright in the pole vault event at the British 1991 AAA Championships.

From 1994 to 2011, he was married to world champion long jumper Fiona May, with whom he had two daughters, Larissa and Anastasia. He lives in Florence and manages his daughter Larissa at professional level via their company JUMP. Since 16 June 2021, he has also been training her, taking over from Gianni Cecconi.

== National titles ==
Gianni Iapichino has won 7 times the individual national championship.

- 3 wins in Pole vault (1990, 1991, 1992)
- 3 wins in Pole vault indoor (1991, 1994, 1995)
- 1 win in heptathlon indoor (1988)

== See also ==
- Italian all-time top lists – Pole vault
