= Athletics at the 1908 Summer Olympics – Men's pole vault =

Men's pole vault at the Games of the IV Olympiad
- Athletics pictogram
- Venue: White City Stadium
- Date: July 24, 1908
- Competitors: 15 from 7 nations
- Winning height: 3.71 OR

Medalists
1st place, gold medalist(s)		Edward Cook; United States
1st place, gold medalist(s)		Alfred Carlton Gilbert; United States
3rd place, bronze medalist(s)		Edward Archibald; Canada
3rd place, bronze medalist(s)		Clare Jacobs; United States
3rd place, bronze medalist(s)		Bruno Söderström; Sweden

The men's pole vault was one of six jumping events on the athletics at the 1908 Summer Olympics programme in London. The competition was held on Friday, July 24, 1908. 15 pole vaulters from seven nations competed. It is the only one of the 111 events featured in 1908 to not have any competitors from the host nation. NOCs could enter up to 12 athletes. The event was won by Edward Cook and Alfred Carlton Gilbert of the United States, the nation's fourth consecutive victory in the men's pole vault. The tie was permitted, rather than a jump-off being held, due to the length of the competition. Similarly, bronze medals were awarded to all three men who had cleared 3.58 metres for third place. Sweden and Canada thus received their first medals in the pole vault, while the United States had the unusual distinction of winning three medals in an event but not sweeping.

== Background ==
This was the fourth appearance of the event, which is one of 12 athletics events to have been held at every Summer Olympics. None of the vaulters from the 1904 Games returned. The world record holder, Walter Dray of the United States, did not compete "because his mother was concerned that he might be injured if he competed." The concern was not unreasonable, as the organizers did not provide anything to break the fall of vaulters. Alfred Carlton Gilbert was the top American competing, having tied for first at the IC4A meet and won the Eastern U.S. Olympic trial. Bruno Söderström of Sweden (1907 AAA champion) and Edward Archibald of Canada (British title holder) were threats to American hegemony in the event.

Canada and the Netherlands each made their first appearance in the event. The United States made its fourth appearance, the only nation to have competed at every Olympic men's pole vault to that point.

== Competition format ==
There was a single round of vaulting (though it is sometimes described as two rounds with scores carried over). Judges determined the starting point for the bar as well as any increases. This was the last Olympics in which the "climbing" technique was allowed. Vaulters received three attempts at each height.

== Records ==
These were the standing world and Olympic records (in metres) prior to the 1908 Summer Olympics.

World record	Walter Dray (USA)	3.90^{*}	Danbury, United States	13 June 1908
Olympic record	Charles Dvorak (USA)	3.50	St. Louis, United States	3 September 1904

^{*} unofficial

Both Edward Cook and Alfred Carlton Gilbert set a new Olympic record with 3.71 metres. All five of the medalists were above the old record; the two men tied for sixth were equal to the old record.

== Results ==
All jumpers had three attempts at each height.

Place	Athlete	Nation	Height	Notes
1st place, gold medalist(s)	Edward Cook	United States	3.71	OR
1st place, gold medalist(s)	Alfred Carlton Gilbert	United States	3.71	OR
3rd place, bronze medalist(s)	Edward Archibald	Canada	3.58	
3rd place, bronze medalist(s)	Clare Jacobs	United States	3.58	
3rd place, bronze medalist(s)	Bruno Söderström	Sweden	3.58	
6	Georgios Banikas	Greece	3.50	
6	Sam Bellah	United States	3.50	
8	Kálmán Szathmáry	Hungary	3.35	
9	Stefanos Kountouriotis	Greece	3.25	
10	Robert Pascarel	France	3.20	
10	Carl Silfverstrand	Sweden	3.20	
12	Thomas Jackson	United States	3.05	
12	Gaston Koëger	France	3.05	
14	Coen van Veenhuijsen	Netherlands	2.89	
15	Bram Evers	Netherlands	2.82	

== Sources ==
- Official Report of the Games of the IV Olympiad (1908).
- De Wael, Herman. Herman's Full Olympians: "Athletics 1908". Accessed 7 April 2006. Available electronically at.
