= Ed Cook =

Ed Cook may refer to:

- Ed Cook (American football) (1932–2007), American National Football League offensive lineman
- Ed Cook (basketball), American college basketball player and coach

== See also ==
- Eddie Cook (disambiguation)
- Edward Cook (disambiguation)
