= Edward Cooke =

Edward Cooke may refer to:

- Edward Cooke (Royal Navy officer) (1772–1799)
- Ed Cooke (author) (born 1982), British writer
- Ed Cooke (American football) (1935–2022), American football defensive end
- Ed Cooke (Australian footballer) (1910–1988), Australian rules footballer
- Edward Cooke (1755–1820), British politician and pamphleteer
- Edward Cooke (Roundhead) (died 1683), English politician who sat in the House of Commons in 1659
- Edward Cooke (sailor), who wrote the 1712 book A Voyage to the South Sea, and Round the World
- Edward Cooke (swimmer), Australian swimmer
- Edward D. Cooke (1849–1897), U.S. Representative from Illinois
- Edward S. Cooke Jr., American art historian
- Edward William Cooke (1811–1880), English painter
- John Cooke (footballer, born 1942) (Edward John Cooke, born 1942), English soccer player

== See also ==
- Edward Cook (disambiguation)
- Edward Coke (disambiguation) (pronounced Cook)
