= Knoroz =

Knoroz is an East Slavic surname. Notable people with the surname include:

- Anna Knoroz (born 1970), Russian hurdler
- Polina Knoroz (born 1999), Russian pole vaulter
