= Edward Cook =

Edward Cook may refer to:

- Edward Rider Cook (1836–1898), English soap manufacturer and Liberal Party politician
- Edward Dutton Cook (1829–1883), English dramatic critic and author
- Edward Cook (athlete) (1888–1972), American athlete
- Edward Tyas Cook (1857–1919), English journalist, biographer, and man of letters
- Edward H. Cook (born 1935), American businessman from Oklahoma

== See also ==
- Ed Cook (disambiguation)
- Eddie Cook (disambiguation)
- Ted Cook (disambiguation)
- Edward Cooke (disambiguation)
- Edward Coke (disambiguation), same pronunciation
