= Eddie Cook =

Eddie Cook may refer to:

- Ed Cook (basketball), Edmund "Eddie" Cook, American basketball player and coach
- Eddie Cook (boxer) (born 1966), American boxer
- Eddie Cook, see Prisoner characters – miscellaneous
- Eddie Cook, character in Paris Blues, played by Sidney Poitier
- Mickey Rourke (born 1952), written several films under the name "Sir Eddie Cook"

== See also ==
- Ed Cook (disambiguation)
- Edward Cook (disambiguation)
