= Clare Jacobs =

American pole vaulter

Clare S. Jacobs
- Circa 1960s as Boating captain

Personal information
- Full name: Clare Stephen Jacobs
- Born: February 18, 1886 Madison, Dakota Territory
- Died: February 21, 1971 (aged 84) Detroit, Michigan
- Occupations: Founder F. L. Jacobs, auto-parts manufacturer
- Height: 178 cm (5 ft 10 in)
- Weight: 64 kg (141 lb) (Olympics)

Sport
- Club: University of Chicago Maroons
Medal record
Men's Pole Vault
Representing United States
Olympic Games
Bronze medal – third place	1908 London	pole vault

Clare Stephen Jacobs (February 18, 1886 – February 21, 1971) was an accomplished businessman, yacht racer, and American track athlete who competed mainly in the pole vault and won an Olympic Bronze medal in the sport in 1908. He was born in Madison, Dakota Territory.

== Early track ==
Jacobs attended both Albion College and the University of Chicago where he competed in track events. He was a member of the U.S. Olympic track team in 1904, though he did not medal.

== Bronze medal ==
Clearing 3.58 meters on July 28, at the age of 22 he won a bronze medal in pole vault for the United States in the London 1908 Summer Olympics. The event resulted in a three-way tie for bronze with Canadian Edward Archibald and Swedish athlete Bruno Söderström. The American athletes competed without the ability to dig holes where they took off as they could in America, and were required to use iron-tipped poles. More significantly, there was no sandpit or bales of straw to break the competitors' falls, as there had been in previous Olympics.

After the 1908 Summer Olympics in July, he continued to compete in track events in Chicago in September, while a student at the University until he completed his studies. In 1909, he set two world records in indoor pole vault, one which was unsurpassed for three years.

== F. L. Jacobs Company ==
In his mid-20's, around 1912, he founded the F. L. Jacobs Company which was named for family member Fred L. Jacobs. Clare's sons John F. Jacobs, and Alvin R. Jacobs would also later work for the company. Under Clare Jacob's direction, the Company began as a small family automotive manufacturing and supply business headquartered in Southfield, Michigan, fifteen miles North of Detroit. In 1956, three years after Clare Jacobs had resigned, the company diversified, expanded its holdings but saw serious problems under the leadership and three year tenure of President and Chairman Alexander Leonard "Sandy" Guterma who would be sentenced to five years in prison beginning in 1960 for stock fraud and siphoning off around two million of the Jacobs's money.

Well after Clare Jacobs's resignation, and with the help of its trustees in the mid to late 1960's the company would gradually recover from a negative net worth, ruined credit, and serious debt. Clare Jacobs was not a target of the suits against the company made by two stockholders in 1959, though two former chairmen, Alexander Sandy Guterma and Hollywood motion picture magnate Hal Roach Jr. were.

=== Quitting F. L. Jacobs ===
Serving for a long period as Vice-President and Treasurer, and as President in 1952, Clare S. Jacobs helped run the company until he resigned in March 1953 at the age of 67. Voicing Clare's own sentiments, Clare's son and co-worker Vice-President John Jacobs, told the press he "couldn't agree with current operating policies". Clare's son A. R. (Alvin) Jacobs remained with the company. At the end of Jacobs's life in 1971, F. L. Jacobs would supply 24 million in stampings and die-castings to the auto industry, have three Michigan divisions in Grand Rapids and Detroit, and operate six plants employing around 750 people. F. L. Jacobs had a controversial history during Jacobs's later life, which included proxy fights, and censure by the New York Stock Exchange and the Securities and Exchange Commission but Clare Jacobs had resigned by that time.

== Master sailor ==
By the 1940's and 1950's, Jacobs had become an accomplished sailor, yacht racing in Spring and Summer, and sometimes ice-boat racing in the winter. Representing the Gross Pointe Yacht Club, he won a deep river race to Put-in-Bay in Western Lake Erie on his boat Revelry in September 1951. He won and placed well in a number of local races. Aboard his yacht Falcon II, in July 1953, he won the 20-mile Grosse Point Yacht Club Regatta on Lake St. Clair against a sizable field of 135 racing craft. The race was traditionally a tune up for Lake Michigan's much longer race to Makinac Island. In late May 1960, despite his advancing age of 74, he won the St. Clair Yacht Club's Thames River Race and sailing in strong 18–20 miles winds a week earlier the Detroit Yacht Club Memorial Day Regatta on Lake St. Clair, just Northeast of Chicago. The local press began referring to him as the "Old Master", and the "Dean of Sailors".

=== Mackinac race victory ===
Chicago Yacht Club emblem

In his most publicized victory, crossing the finish line around 9:11 PM on July 15, 1962, he won Lake Michigan's long and legendary Mackinac Race, now known as the Chicago Yacht Club Race to Mackinac aboard his 45-foot sloop Falcon II. He was seventy-six years old and his win came against a seasoned field of 105 racing yachts. The multi-day race is now the longest annual freshwater sailing race in the world.

The racecourse is usually run between the Chicago Light House off the Southern base of Eastern Michigan and ends near Mackinac Island off the Northernmost part of Michigan and at the westernmost part of Lake Huron. It now spans around 330 miles, roughly the full length of Michigan's Eastern coast, though it was 235 miles in 1962 for Jacobs' victory in the 38th annual competition. The prestigious amateur race has been held since 1898, and has been sponsored by Detroit's Bayview Yacht Club, and more recently the Chicago Yacht Club.

Much of the race in 1962 featured light winds. With the wind nearly at a standstill near the end of the race, Jacobs hugged the Michigan shore to catch an off-shore breeze, and finished in a time that allowing for his handicap, would beat his chief rival Charley Kotovic, who had won the race in three prior years. A long and stressful multi-day ordeal, Jacobs's winning time was 54 hours, 41 minutes, and 14 seconds. Due to the longer length of the race and very light winds, especially at the end, the race time was the slowest since 1935, but great skill, patience, boat-handling, and a sailor's intuition were required to lead the pack.

Continuing his racing avocation against a field of 200 competitors, on Saturday, July 11, 1964, Jacobs fought gale force winds to finish first in the Grosse Pointe Regatta's Class A Division.

Jacobs was a member of the Bayview Yacht Club, Detroit Yacht Club, and Grosse Pointe Yacht Club, as well as the Detroit Rotary Club. He worked close to forty years as a co-founder of F. L. Jacobs, beginning around 1912. With a large family when he died in February 1971, he left a wife, Myrtle, two sons, A. R. (Bill) and John, two daughters, Clair and Helen and a number of grand and great-grandchildren. He was buried at Roseland Park Cemetery in Berkley, Michigan, north of Detroit. His wife Myrtle would be buried beside him in 1989.
