= Thomas Jackson (athlete) =

American pole vaulter

Thomas Marshall Jackson (January 15, 1884 – February 22, 1967) was an American track and field athlete who competed in the 1908 Summer Olympics. In 1908, he finished twelfth in the pole vault competition.
