= Bram Evers =

Dutch athlete (1886–1952)

Brand "Bram" Evers (16 July 1886 – 7 October 1952) was a Dutch athlete, who competed at the 1908 Summer Olympics in London. He was born in Arnhem, the city where he also died.

In the 400 metres competition, Evers placed third in his preliminary heat and did not advance to the semifinals. He did not finish his initial semifinal heat of the 800 metres event, not advancing to the final. He was also a member of the Dutch relay team, which was eliminated in the first round of the medley relay competition.

In the pole vault event he finished 15th. He also participated in the long jump event and in the standing long jump competition but for both contests his results are unknown.

In 1922, he was the interim coach of the Dutch football (soccer) club Vitesse Arnhem for a short while.

== Sources ==
- Cook, Theodore Andrea (1908). The Fourth Olympiad, Being the Official Report. London: British Olympic Association.
- De Wael, Herman (2001). "Athletics 1908". Herman's Full Olympians. Archived from the original on 27 September 2006.
- Wudarski, Pawel (1999). "Wyniki Igrzysk Olimpijskich" (in Polish).
