= Edward Archibald (athlete) =

Canadian pole vaulter

- At the 1908 Summer Olympics

Personal information
- Born: March 29, 1884 Toronto, Ontario, Canada
- Died: March 20, 1965 (aged 80) Toronto, Ontario, Canada
- Education: Victoria University, Toronto
- Height: 6 ft 0 in (183 cm)
- Weight: 170 lb (77 kg)

Sport
- Country: Canada
- Sport: Pole vault; Men's Pentathlon

Achievements and titles
- World finals: 1906 Intercalated Games; 1908 Summer Olympics
Medal record
Bronze medal – third place	1908 London	Pole vault

Edward Blake Archibald (March 29, 1884 – March 20, 1965) was a Canadian athlete who competed mainly in the pole vault. He was born and died in Toronto.

He competed for Canada in the 1908 Summer Olympics held in London, Great Britain in the pole vault, where he won the Bronze medal jointly with American Clare Jacobs and Swede Bruno Söderström.

In 1924, he opened a boy's summer fitness and wilderness camp near Lake Wanapitei, in Sudbury, Ontario. In 2001, he was inducted into the University of Toronto Sports Hall of Fame.

== Early life ==
Archibald was the youngest boy in his family, which included seven children. His father was a Methodist preacher, and Archibald had a strict religious upbringing. Archibald recalled that Sundays were dedicated to church attendance and reading the bible; there was "no card playing allowed in the house on Sundays and no dancing". Archibald was offered an athletic scholarship to attend Syracuse University in New York, but declined it, and instead enrolled at the University of Toronto.

== Athletic career ==
In 1905, at the University of Toronto, he set an intercollegiate pole vault record of 10' 2¼", and later, a world record of 12' 5½". In 1906, he traveled to Greece and competed in the "Athens Olympics", commonly known as the Intercalary Games, an athletic competition that honored the 10th anniversary of the first Olympic Games in 1896. Unfortunately during his trip by train to the event, his personal vaulting pole, fastened to the side of the train, came up missing. He was lent a replacement pole by Greek officials. He finished 10th in the pole vault event, and 7th in the men's pentathlon.

In 1907, he graduated from the university and competed locally as a member of the Toronto YMCA. In 1908, he was selected to represent Canada at the 1908 Summer Olympics. He travelled to England and won the pole jump event at the British 1908 AAA Championships before the Olympic Games began. Archibald also served as his country's flagbearer at the Olympics. He won a bronze medal in the pole vault event, that he shared jointly with American Clare Jacobs and Swede Bruno Söderström. He was also presented a diploma by Lord Desborough, President of the British Olympic Council, and during the event, he was described by King Edward VII as "the best example of a true Canadian that he had ever met."

== Post Olympics career ==
Archibald worked as a prospector and was also involved with the YMCA. In 1915, Archibald traveled overseas, where he was in charge of sports and recreation programs for the soldiers. When he returned, he worked as a sports editor at the Ottawa Journal and was instrumental in getting a sporting goods store opened for the Ottawa Amateur Athletic Federation.

In 1924, he opened a boy's summer fitness and wilderness camp near Lake Wanapitei, in Sudbury, Ontario. Twenty years later, he expanded the camp to include a YMCA's sports program, which was dedicated to Canada's World War II veterans.

Archibald died in Toronto in 1965 at the age of 80. In 2001, he was inducted into the University of Toronto Sports Hall of Fame.

== See also ==
- Olympic sports
- List of lakes in Ontario
- YMCA
