= Edward Coke (disambiguation) =

Edward Coke (1552–1634) was an English barrister, judge and jurist.

Edward Coke may also refer to:

- Edward Coke, 7th Earl of Leicester (1936–2015), British peer
- Edward Coke, Viscount Coke (1719–1753), British Member of Parliament
- Edward Coke (1758–1837), British politician and landowner
- Edward Coke (1824–1889), British politician
- Sir Edward Coke, 1st Baronet (died 1669) of the Coke baronets
- Sir Edward Coke, 3rd Baronet (1648–1727) of the Coke baronets

== See also ==
- Edward Coke Crow (1861–1945), United States Attorney General
- Edward Cook (disambiguation)
- Edward Cooke (disambiguation)
