= Alfred Carlton Gilbert =

American inventor and athlete (1884–1961)

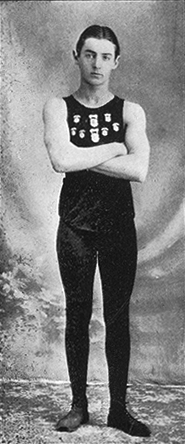
- AC Gilbert as a young athlete at Pacific University in 1902

Personal information
- Born: February 15, 1884 Salem, Oregon, U.S.
- Died: January 24, 1961 (aged 76) Boston, Massachusetts, U.S.
Medal record
Men's athletics
Representing the United States
Gold medal – first place	1908 London	Pole vault

Alfred Carlton Gilbert (February 15, 1884 – January 24, 1961) was an American inventor, athlete, magician, toy maker and businessman. As the founder of A. C. Gilbert Company, Gilbert was known for inventing the Erector Set and American Flyer Trains.

== Early life and education ==
Born in Salem, Oregon, Gilbert was educated at the Tualatin Academy and attended Pacific University in nearby Forest Grove, Oregon, where he was a member of the Gamma Sigma Fraternity. He left Pacific after 1902 and transferred to Yale University, financing his education by working as a magician, and earning a degree in medicine. His thesis had the title The Genito-Urinary Phenomena of Athletes.

An accomplished athlete, he broke the world record for consecutive chin-ups (39) in 1900 and the distance record for the running long dive in 1902. He invented the pole vault box and set two world records in the pole vault including a record for 12′ 3″ (3.66 meters) at the Spring meet of the Irish American Athletic Club, held at Celtic Park, New York, in 1906. In the pole vault competition at the 1908 Summer Olympics, he tied for gold with fellow American Edward Cook, setting an Olympic record.

== Career ==
Choosing not to pursue a medical career, Gilbert founded Mysto Manufacturing, a manufacturer of magic sets, with his friend John Petrie, in 1907. This company later became the A. C. Gilbert Company. Gilbert developed the Erector Set, a construction toy, in 1913 (preceded by the similar Meccano set conceived by Frank Hornby in 1898 which he developed and patented as "Mechanics Made Easy" in 1901). His inspiration was steel construction girders used on the New York, New Haven and Hartford Railroad. In 1918, with the United States embroiled in World War I and the Council of National Defense considering a ban on toy production, Gilbert argued successfully against it. The press gave him the nickname "The man who saved Christmas." Gilbert had by then contributed to the war effort by becoming one of the Four Minute Men who gave short lectures to movie audiences, thus encouraging citizens to purchase war bonds.

By 1935, his company had sold more than 30 million of the Erector sets. He also added chemistry sets, microscope sets, and other educational toys to his product line, accumulating more than 150 patents during his 50-year career. In 1938, he acquired the rights to the American Flyer toy train line from W. O. Coleman and moved their production from Chicago to New Haven. At the same time, he adopted a 3/16 scale for this train line while keeping the three-rail O-gauge track then associated with Lionel, a competitor. Following World War II, O-gauge track was abandoned in favor of two-rail S-gauge track. Gilbert was lauded for his adherence to scale realism, making American Flyer trains look more real and less toylike.

Gilbert is credited with originating the concept of providing benefits for his employees, including free medical and legal advice and maternity leave. In 1915 he founded the Toy Manufacturers of America trade association and was its first president.

Frustrated that invention was an important part of American society not taught in schools, in 1941, Gilbert opened the Gilbert Hall of Science in New York City a science and technology museum. It served the dual purpose of promoting interest in science and selling Gilbert's products.

In 1950–1951 he marketed the Gilbert U-238 Atomic Energy Laboratory, which contained radioactive ore samples of autunite, carnotite, torbernite and uraninite.

== Personal life ==
In 1908, he married Mary Thompson, whom he had met at Pacific University. They had three children: two girls and a boy. In the 1930s, they lived in a property in Hamden, Connecticut called Maraldene which included kennels where Gilbert bred German Shepherds including one which won the Max von Stephanitz award. He also owned a nearby 600-acre estate that he called Paradise. He used it for hunting and it housed his big-game trophies. It was a venue for him to entertain clients and guests attending the Yale Bowl.

== Later years ==
Upon his retirement in 1954, Gilbert turned his company over to his son. The same year, he published his autobiography, titled The Man Who Lives in Paradise. After his death in 1961, the family sold its remaining shares in the A. C. Gilbert Company to Jack Wrather. It went out of business in 1967, although the Erector trademark continued to be used.

== Legacy ==
A museum in Gilbert's birthplace of Salem, Oregon, A. C. Gilbert's Discovery Village, is named in his honor. The museum comprises several historic structures, including the house of Gilbert's uncle Andrew T. Gilbert. It opened in 1989.

The television movie The Man Who Saved Christmas is a dramatization of Christmas during the years 1917 and 1918 when America was involved in World War I. He was portrayed by Jason Alexander. The film takes several historical liberties. It debuted December 15, 2002.

Pacific University in Forest Grove, Oregon, has a residential hall named after him that was opened in 2009.

== Publications ==
- Gilbert Mysto Magic (1919)
- Gilbert 75 Electrical Toys and Tricks (1919)
- Gilbert Chemical Magic (1920)
- Gilbert Handkerchief Tricks for Boys (1920)
- Gilbert Hydraulic and Pneumatic Engineering (1920)
- Gilbert Knots & Splices with Rope-Tying Tricks (1920)
- Gilbert Magnetic Fun and Facts (1920)
- Gilbert Carpentry for Boys (1920)
- Gilbert Weather Bureau (meteorology) for Boys (1920)
- Experimental Glass Blowing for Boys (1920)
- Gilbert Mineralogy for Boys (1921)
- Gilbert Mineralogy: Fun with Minerals (1922)
- Gilbert Coin Tricks for Boys (1938)
- Roar of the Rails (1944)
- Fun With Gilbert Chemistry (1946)
- American Flyer Instruction Book (1952)
- Gilbert Home Chemistry (1952)
- The Man Who Lives in Paradise (1954)
