= Edward Cook (athlete) =

American pole vaulter (1888–1972)

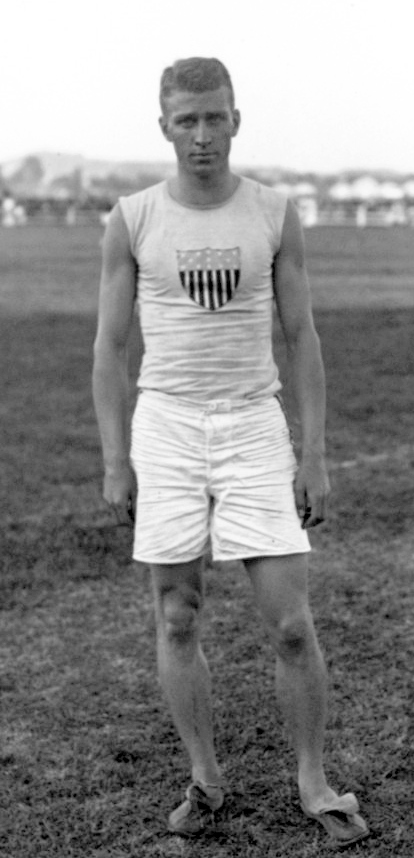
- Cook at an international meet in 1908

Personal information
- Born: November 27, 1888 Chillicothe, Ohio, U.S.
- Died: October 18, 1972 (aged 83) Chillicothe, Ohio, U.S.
- Height: 1.78 m (5 ft 10 in)
- Weight: 66 kg (146 lb)

Sport
- Sport: Athletics
- Events: Pole vault, long jump, high jump, sprint
- Club: Cleveland Athletic Club

Achievements and titles
- Personal bests: PV – 3.81 m (1911); LJ – 7.15 m (1906); HJ – 1.835 m (1906); 100 yd – 10.0 (1906)
Medal record
Representing the United States
Olympic Games
Gold medal – first place	1908 London	Pole vault

Edward Tiffin Cook Sr. (November 27, 1888 – October 18, 1972) was an American athlete who shared the gold medal in the pole vault (with Alfred Carlton Gilbert) at the 1908 Summer Olympics.

Cook was an all-around athlete and won the IC4A long jump title in 1908 and 1909 and the AAU pole vault title in 1907 and 1911. He graduated from Cornell University in 1910 and later became a farmer and director of the First National Bank in his native Chillicothe, Ohio. He was elected to the Sphinx Head Society during his senior year.
