= Edward S. Cooke Jr. =

Edward S. Cooke, Jr. is an American historian. He is the Charles F. Montgomery Professor of American Decorative Arts in the Department of the History of Art at Yale University.

== Books ==
- Making Furniture in Pre-industrial America: The Social Economy of Newtown and Woodbury, Connecticut (Johns Hopkins Press, 1996)
- Inventing Boston: Design, Production and Consumption in the Atlantic World, 1680–1720 (Yale University Press, 2019)
- Global Objects: Toward a Connected Art History (Princeton University Press, 2022)
