= Polina Knoroz =

Russian pole vaulter (born 1999)

Personal information
- National team: Russia
- Born: Polina Knoroz; 20 July 1999 (age 26) Saint Petersburg, Russia
- Occupation: Pole vaulter
- Years active: 2014 - present
- Height: 1.71 m (5 ft 7 1/2 in)
- Weight: 58 kg (128 lb)

Sport
- Country: Russia
- Sport: Athletics
- Event: Pole vault

Polina Knoroz (Russian: Полина Кнороз, born 20 July 1999 in Saint Petersburg, Russia) is a Russian pole vaulter and athlete. She started her career in 2014, when she was at school.

== Biography ==
Polina Knoroz was born on 20 July 1999 in Saint Petersburg, Russia.

By profession, she is a Russian pole vaulter and athlete who competes internationally for Russia. In 2020 she participated at the Russian Indoor Athletics Championship and won the silver medal with a vault of 4.65m. Her best vault of 2021 was 4.65 in Znamenskikh stadium, Moscow.

In the same year, she began to attract attention online, with Lifestyle Asia magazine listing her alongside six other athletes from the 2020 Tokyo Olympics to become "a sensation" on social media. Those athletes included Pita Taufatofua, Alica Schmidt, Arthur Nory Oyakawa Mariano, Zehra Gunes, Ran Takahashi, and Avishag Semberg.

As of 2026, she is ranked #7 in Europe and #15 globally.

== Progression ==
Personal best

Year	Performance	Venue	Date
2026	4.91	(Russia) Cheboksary	20 June 2026
2026	4.87	(Russia) Moscow	07 June 2026
2025	4.86	(Russia) Kazan	10 August 2025
2024	4.80	(Russia) Kazan	15 June 2024
2022	4.81 i	(France) Clermont-Ferrand	19 February 2022
2021	4.75	(Russia) Moscow	29 May 2021
2019	4.56	(Russia) Kaluga	15 June 2019
2019	4.50	(Russia) Moscow	06 June 2019
