= Bruno Söderström =

Swedish track and field athlete

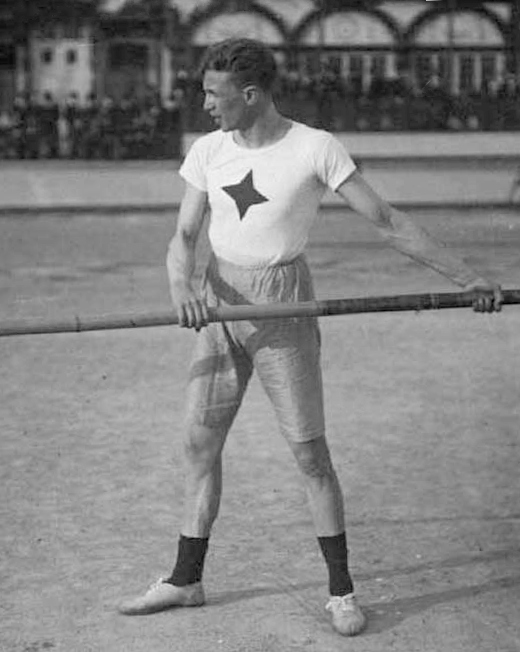

Personal information
- Born: 28 October 1881 Stockholm, Sweden
- Died: 1 January 1969 (aged 87)
- Height: 184 cm (6 ft 0 in)
- Weight: 78 kg (172 lb)

Sport
- Sport: Athletics
- Events: Javelin throw, pole vault, high jump, hurdles
- Club: IFK Stockholm

Achievements and titles
- Personal bests: JT – 45.00 m (1906); PV – 3.66 m (190); HJ – 1.73 m (1904); 110 mH – 16.2 (1907)
Medal record
Representing Sweden
Olympic Games
Silver medal – second place	1906 Athens	Pole vault
Bronze medal – third place	1906 Athens	Javelin throw
Bronze medal – third place	1908 London	Pole vault

Vilhelm Bruno Söderström (28 October 1881 – 1 January 1969) was a Swedish track and field athlete. He competed at the 1906 Intercalated Games and 1908 Summer Olympics in the javelin throw, pole vault and high jump and won three medals. He also served as the Swedish flag bearer at the 1906 Games.

Söderström represented IFK Stockholm. His elder brother Gustaf competed in athletics events at the 1900 Games.

Söderström won the pole jump event (as it was called at the time) at the British 1907 AAA Championships. The following year he finished second behind Ed Archibald at the 1908 AAA Championships.

Besides athletics, Söderström was a banker and a sports administrator. In 1909, after visiting the United States, he began popularising bowling in Sweden and building the first bowling venues there. Next year, he founded Idrottsbladet, which soon became the major Swedish sports newspaper, and became its first editor. He later wrote several books in various genres, including fiction.
