= Pole vault =

Track and field event

Athletics Pole vault
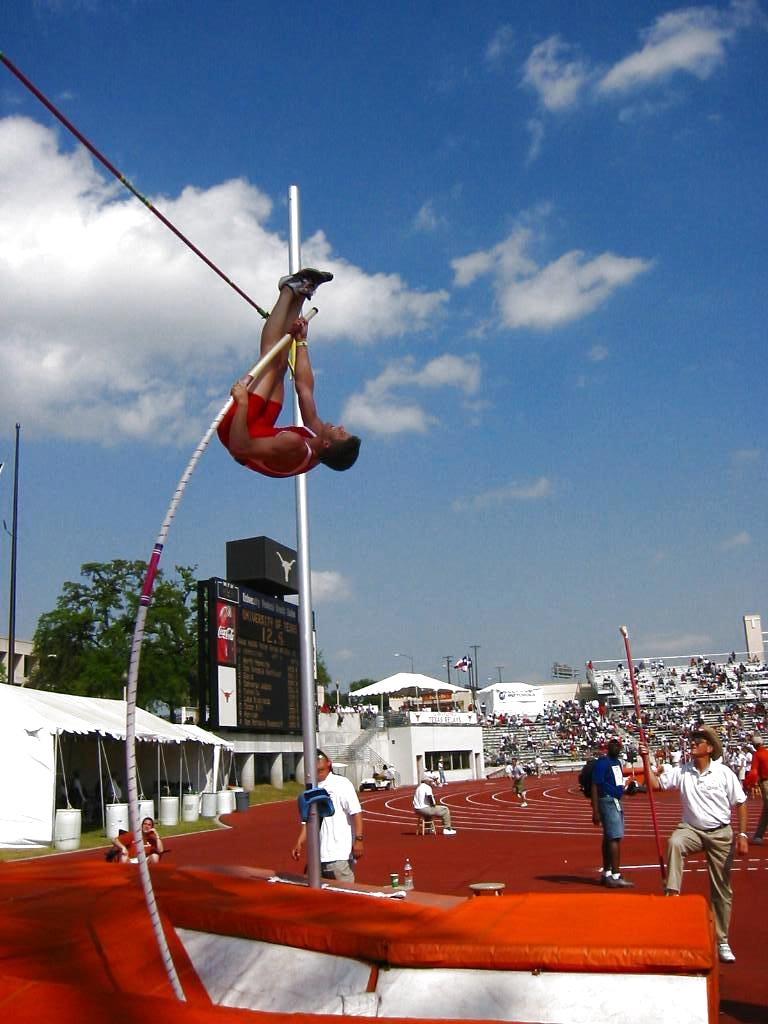
- An athlete in the middle of the vaulting phase

World records
- Men: (Sweden) Armand Duplantis 6.31 m (20 ft 8 1/4 in) i (2026)
- Women: (Russia) Yelena Isinbayeva 5.06 m (16 ft 7 in) (2009)

Olympic records
- Men: (Sweden) Armand Duplantis 6.25 m (20 ft 6 in) (2024)
- Women: (Russia) Yelena Isinbayeva 5.05 m (16 ft 6 3/4 in) (2008)

World Championship records
- Men: (Sweden) Armand Duplantis 6.30 m (20 ft 8 in) (2025)
- Women: (Russia) Yelena Isinbayeva 5.01 m (16 ft 5 in) (2005)

World Indoor Championship records
- Men: (Sweden) Armand Duplantis 6.25 m (20 ft 6 in) (2026)
- Women: (United States) Sandi Morris 4.95 m (16 ft 2 3/4 in) (2018)

Pole vaulting, also known as pole jumping, is a track and field event in which an athlete uses a long and flexible pole, usually made from fiberglass or carbon fiber, as an aid to jump over a bar. Pole jumping was already practiced by the ancient Egyptians, ancient Greeks and the ancient Irish people, although modern pole vaulting, an athletic contest where height is measured, was first established by the German teacher Johann Christoph Friedrich GutsMuths in the 1790s. It has been a full medal event at the Olympic Games since 1896 for men and since 2000 for women.

It is typically classified as one of the four major jumping events in athletics, alongside the high jump, long jump and triple jump. It is unusual among track and field events in that it requires a significant amount of specialised equipment in order to participate, even at a basic level. A number of elite pole vaulters have had backgrounds in gymnastics, including world record breakers Yelena Isinbayeva and Brian Sternberg, reflecting the similar physical attributes required for the events. Physical attributes such as speed, agility and strength, along with technical skill, are essential to pole vaulting.

== History ==
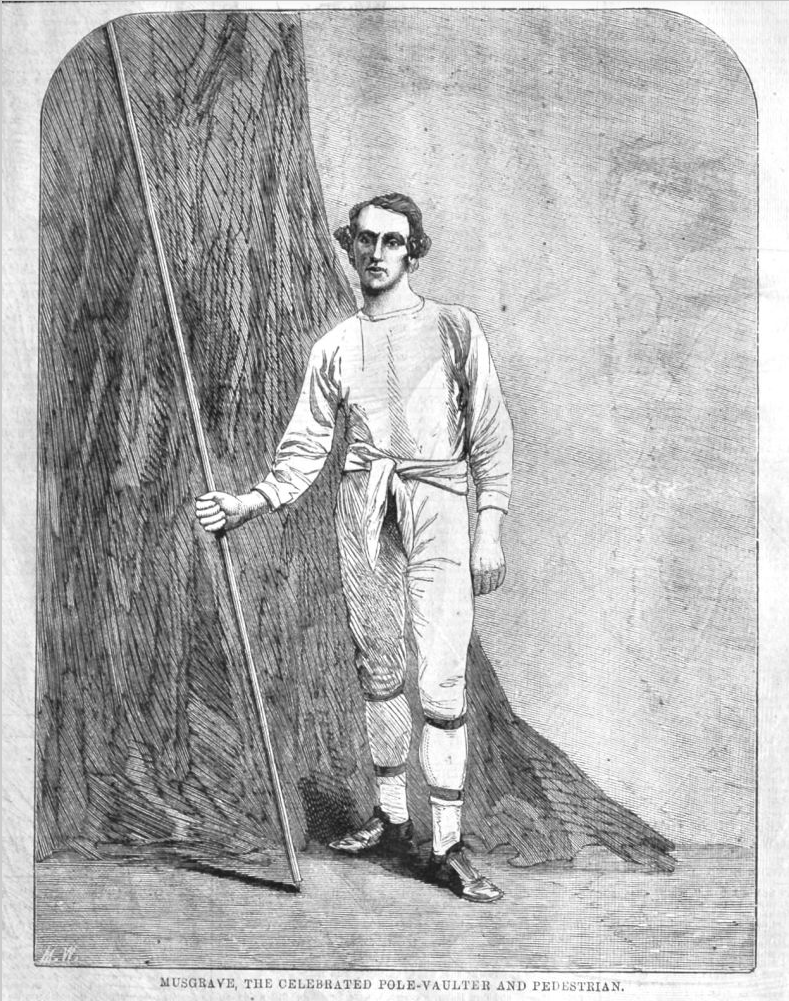
Robert Musgrave of Keswick (1841−1901), the first man to clear more than ten feet in the pole vault.

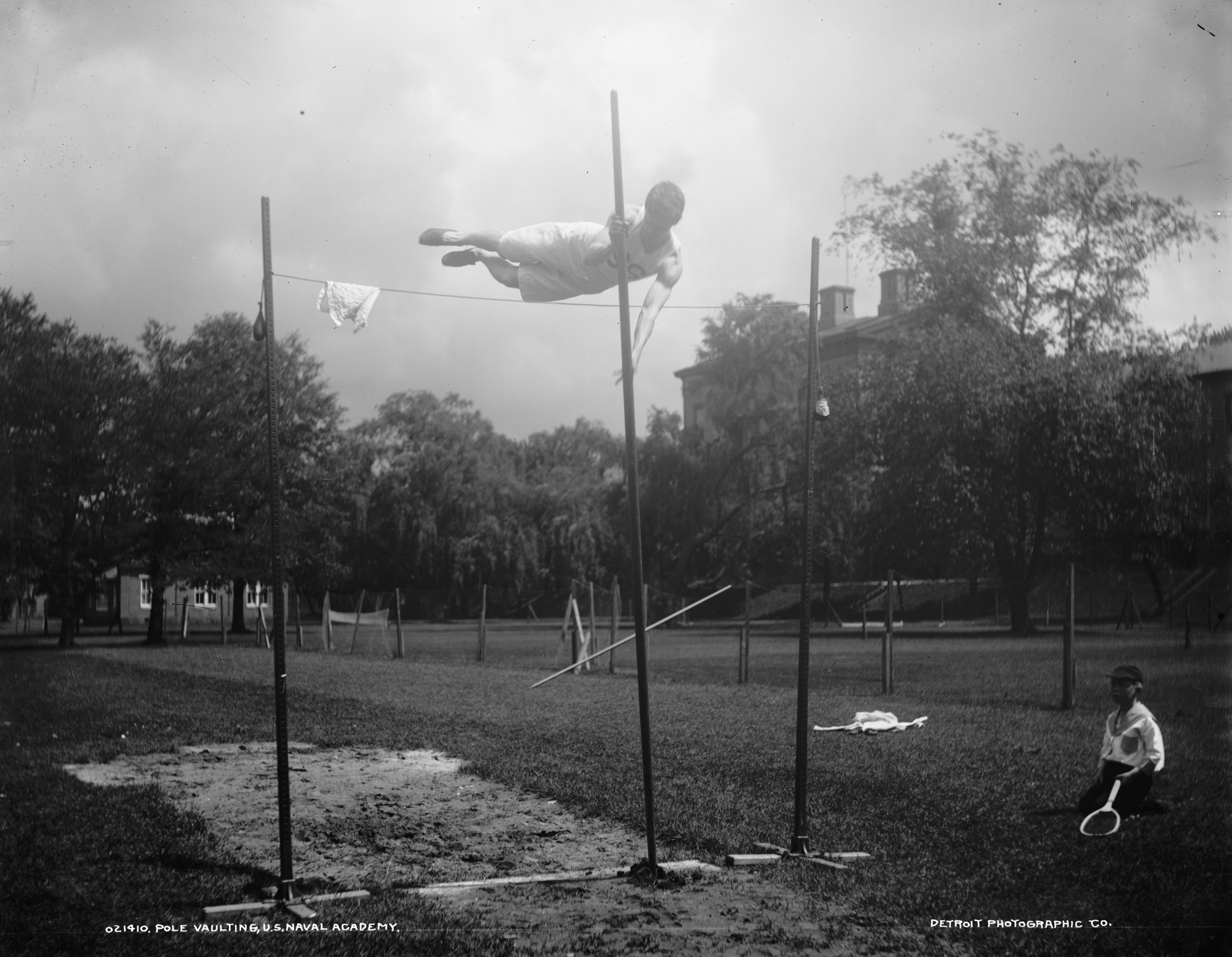
Pole vault in the 1890s at US Naval Academy

Pole jumping was already practiced by the ancient Egyptians, ancient Greeks and the ancient Irish people. As depicted on stone engravings and artifacts dating back to c. 2500 BC, the Egyptians used spears to mount enemy structures, and to pass over irrigation ditches. Vases and pots from Greece show that poles were used by the locals to jump onto or over objects. From c. 1800 BC to c. 550 BC, a sport akin to pole vaulting was probably included in the Irish Tailteann Games, although the pole might have been used for gaining distance rather than height, as ancient Irish farmers used poles to jump over canals and rivers. Modern pole vaulting, an athletic contest where height is measured, was first established by the German teacher Johann Christoph Friedrich GutsMuths in the 1790s. GutsMuths is also considered by many to be the father of modern pole vaulting, as he described jumping standards, the distance of the approach, recommendations on hand grip, and the principles of pole jumping. It was first practiced as a sport in Germany, later spreading to the United Kingdom and the United States. The earliest recorded pole vaulting competition in England where height was measured took place at the Ulverston Football and Cricket Club, Lancashire, north of the sands, in 1843. Pole vault was one of the athletics events of the inaugural Olympic Games in 1896.

Originally, poles were made of ash and from hickory wood. Bamboo poles were introduced in 1904, and both aluminum and steel poles appeared after 1945. Glass fiber vaulting poles received much notice in the American press in the early 1960s. John Uelses set a new world record with one on 2 February 1962. In February 1963 the standing world record was surpassed by UCLA's C. K. Yang and two other vaulters within a nine-day period using fiberglass poles.. Poles made of glass fiber were not new at the time, however. Herb Jenks had been manufacturing them since 1948—the year Bob Mathias first used one—and Mathias's pole was fiberglass when he won the decathlon at the 1952 Olympics.

James Monroe Lindler of the Columbia Products Company (Columbia, SC) filed a patent application on 10 March 1967—granted patent status on 27 January 1970—for the manufacture of, "a vaulting pole of hollow construction with an integral helical winding," and a method of manufacturing the same (see: US Patent US3491999A). The process starts with a metal tube, referred to in the industry as a mandrel, around which is wound a tape made of glass fibers impregnated with a resin. This is baked in an oven and after cooling the mandrel is removed to leave a hollow glass fiber tube. This process was based on a similar method used for manufacturing glass fiber golf clubs patented by the Woolley Manufacturing Company of Escondido, California in 1954 (see: US Patent US2822175A).

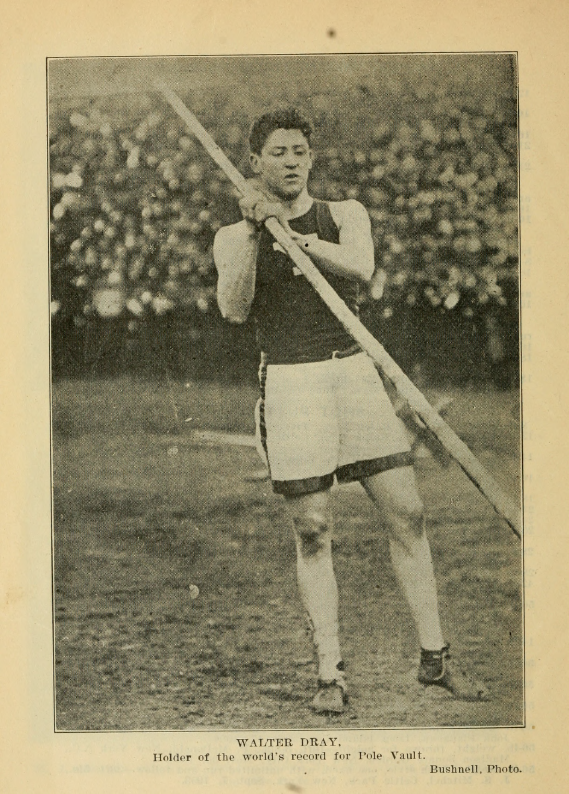
Walter R. Dray, holder of the world record for the pole vault of 12ft 9 1/2in (3.90m) set at Danbury, Connecticut, 13 June 1908.

In September 2005, Jeffrey P. Watry, Ralph W. Paquin, and Kenneth A. Hursey of Gill Athletic, Champaign, Illinois, filed application to patent a new method of winding the glass fibers around the pole in layers, each wound in a different direction or orientation to provide specific properties to various parts of the pole. This was called Carbon Weave, and their patent was granted on 21 October 2008 (see: US Patent US3491999A). David J. Dodge and William C. Doble of the Alliance Design and Development Group of New York City, New York, were granted a patent in 2006 for the manufacture of, "sports equipment having a tubular structural member" which led to the introduction of carbon fiber vaulting poles in 2007 (see: US Patent US7140398B2).

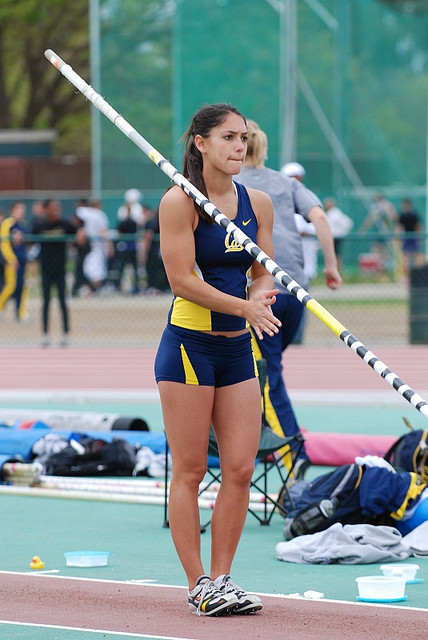
Pole vaulter Allison Stokke prepares for her jump.

In 2000, IAAF rule 260.18a (formerly 260.6a) was amended, so that "world records" (as opposed to "indoor world records") can be set in a facility "with or without roof". This rule was not applied retroactively. With many indoor facilities not conforming to outdoor track specifications for size and flatness, the pole vault was the only world record set indoors until 2022.

== Modern vaulting ==
Today, athletes compete in the pole vault as one of the four jumping events in track and field. Because the high jump and pole vault are both vertical jumps, the competitions are conducted similarly. Each athlete can choose at what height they would like to enter the competition. Most pole vault competitions include warm-up periods or open practice jumps for an athlete waiting to jump for a certain amount of time after the event begins. Warm-up vaults are awarded if an athlete passes a certain number of heights, or does not jump for a certain amount of time. Once they enter, they have three attempts to clear the height. If a height is cleared, the vaulter advances to the next height, where they will have three more attempts. Once the vaulter has three consecutive misses, they are out of the competition and the highest height they cleared is their result. A "no height", often denoted "NH", refers to the failure of a vaulter to clear any bar during the competition.

Once the vaulter enters the competition, they can choose to pass heights. If a vaulter achieves a miss on their first attempt at a height, they can pass to the next height, but they will only have two attempts at that height, as they will be out once they achieve three consecutive misses. Similarly, after earning two misses at a height, they could pass to the next height, where they would have only one attempt.

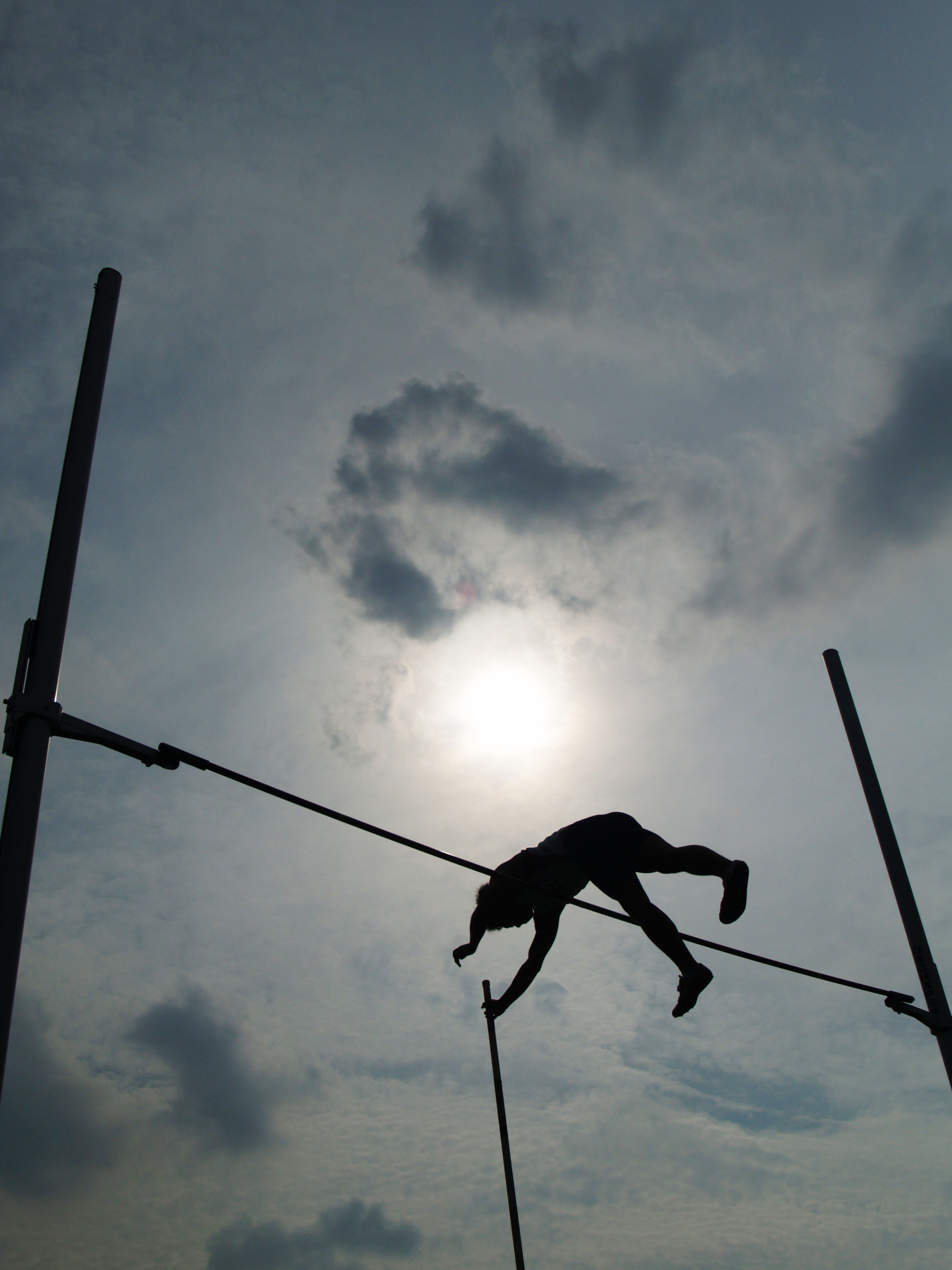
An athlete passes the bar with the aid of a pole.

The competitor who clears the highest height is the winner. If two or more vaulters have finished with the same height, the tie is broken by the number of misses at the final height. If the tied vaulters have the same number of misses at the last height cleared, the tie is broken by the total number of misses in the competition.

If there is still a tie for first place, a jump-off occurs to break the tie. Marks achieved in this type of jump-off are considered valid and count for any purpose that a mark achieved in a normal competition would.

If a tie in the other places still exists, a jump-off is not normally conducted, unless the competition is a qualifying meet, and the tie exists in the final qualifying spot. In this case, an administrative jump-off is conducted to break the tie, but the marks are not considered valid for any other purpose than breaking the tie.

A jump-off is a sudden death competition in which the tied vaulters attempt the same height, starting with the last attempted height. If both vaulters miss, the bar goes down by a small increment, and if both clear, the bar goes up by a small increment. A jump-off ends when one vaulter clears and the other misses. Each vaulter gets one attempt at each height until one clears and one misses.

The equipment and rules for pole vaulting are similar to the high jump. Unlike high jump, however, the athlete in the vault has the ability to select the horizontal position of the bar, known as the standards, before each jump and can place it a distance beyond the back of the box, the metal pit that the pole is placed into immediately before takeoff. The range of distance the vaulter may place the standards varies depending on the level of competition.

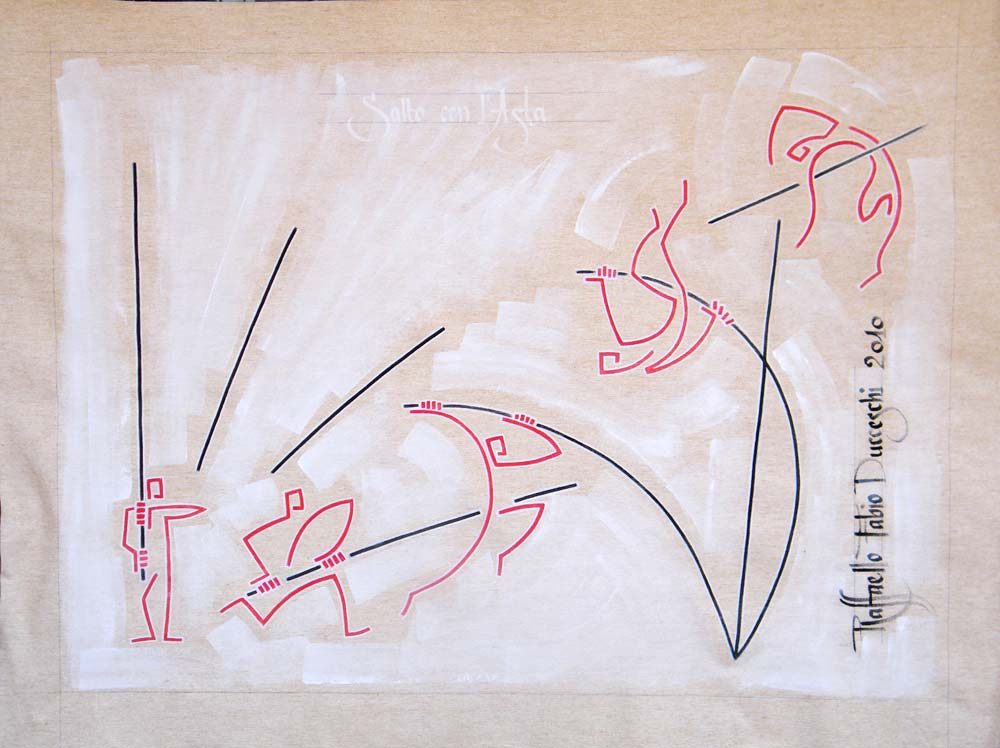
Painting by former athlete Raffaello Ducceschi depicting the pole vault

If the pole used by the athlete dislodges the bar from the uprights, a foul attempt is ruled, even if the athlete has cleared the height. An athlete does not benefit from quickly leaving the landing pad before the bar has fallen. The exception to this rule is if the vaulter is vaulting outdoors and has made a clear effort to throw the pole back, but the wind has blown the pole into the bar; this counts as a clearance. This call is made at the discretion of the pole vault official. If the pole breaks during the execution of a vault, it is considered an equipment failure and is ruled a non-jump, neither a make nor a miss. Other types of equipment failure include the standards slipping down or the wind dislodging the bar when no contact was made by the vaulter.

Each athlete has a set amount of time in which to make an attempt. The time starts when the official deems the standards to be set, ready for the athlete to attempt their jump. When every athlete is still in the competition, each vaulter has one minute to complete their jump. When 3 athletes are remaining the time moves to 2 minutes. 2 athletes remaining gets 3 minutes. After the final jumper remains, he or she gets 5 minutes on the runway. The amount of time varies by level of competition and the number of vaulters remaining. If the vaulter fails to begin an attempt within this time, the vaulter is charged with a time foul and the attempt is a miss.

Poles are manufactured with ratings corresponding to the vaulter's maximum weight. As a safety precaution, some organizations forbid use of poles rated below the vaulter's weight. The recommended weight roughly corresponds to a flex rating that is determined by the manufacturer by applying a standardized amount of stress (most commonly 23 kgf (230 N or 50 lb)) on the pole and measuring how much the center of the pole is displaced. Therefore, two poles rated at the same weight are not necessarily the same stiffness.

Pole stiffness and length are important factors to a vaulter's performance. Therefore, it is not uncommon for an elite vaulter to carry as many as ten poles to a competition. The effective length of a pole can be changed by gripping the pole higher or lower in relation to the top of the pole. The left and right handgrips are typically a bit more than shoulder width apart. Poles are manufactured for people of all skill levels and body sizes, with lengths between 3.05 m (10 ft 0 in) and 5.30 m (17 ft 5 in) and a wide range of weight ratings. Each manufacturer determines the weight rating for the pole and the location of the maximum handhold band.

== Technology ==
Competitive pole vaulting began using solid ash poles. As the heights attained increased, bamboo poles gave way to tubular aluminum, which was tapered at each end. Today's pole vaulters benefit from poles produced by wrapping pre-cut sheets of fiberglass that contains resin around a metal pole mandrel, to produce a slightly curved pole that bends more easily under the compression caused by an athlete's take-off. The shape of the fiberglass sheets and the amount of fiberglass used is carefully planned to provide the desired length and stiffness of pole. Different fiber types, including carbon fiber, are used to give poles specific characteristics intended to promote higher jumps. In recent years, carbon fiber has been added to the commonly used E-glass (E for initial electrical use) and S-glass (S for solid) materials to create a lighter pole.

As in the high jump, the landing area was originally a heap of sawdust or sand where athletes landed on their feet. As technology enabled higher vaults, mats evolved into bags of large chunks of foam. Today's mats are foam usually 1–1.5 meters (3 ft 3 in – 4 ft 11 in) thick. They are usually built up with two cross-laid square section logs with gaps between them, topped by a solid layer of foam of the same thickness. This lattice construction is wrapped in a close-fitting cover topped with nylon mesh, which allows some air to escape, thus combining both foam and a measure of air cushioning. The final layer is a large mat of mesh-covered foam which is clipped around the edges of the complete pit and prevents the athlete from falling between the individual bags. The size of mats used has been increasing in area to minimize the risk of injury. Proper landing technique is on the back or shoulders. Landing on the feet should be avoided, to eliminate the risk of injury to the lower extremities, particularly ankle sprains.

Rule changes over the years have resulted in larger landing areas and additional padding of all hard and unyielding surfaces.

The pole vault crossbar has evolved from a triangular aluminum bar to a round fiberglass bar with rubber ends. This is balanced on standards and can be knocked off when it is hit by a pole vaulter or the pole. Rule changes have led to shorter pegs and crossbar ends that are semi-circular.

== Technique ==
Phases of pole vaulting
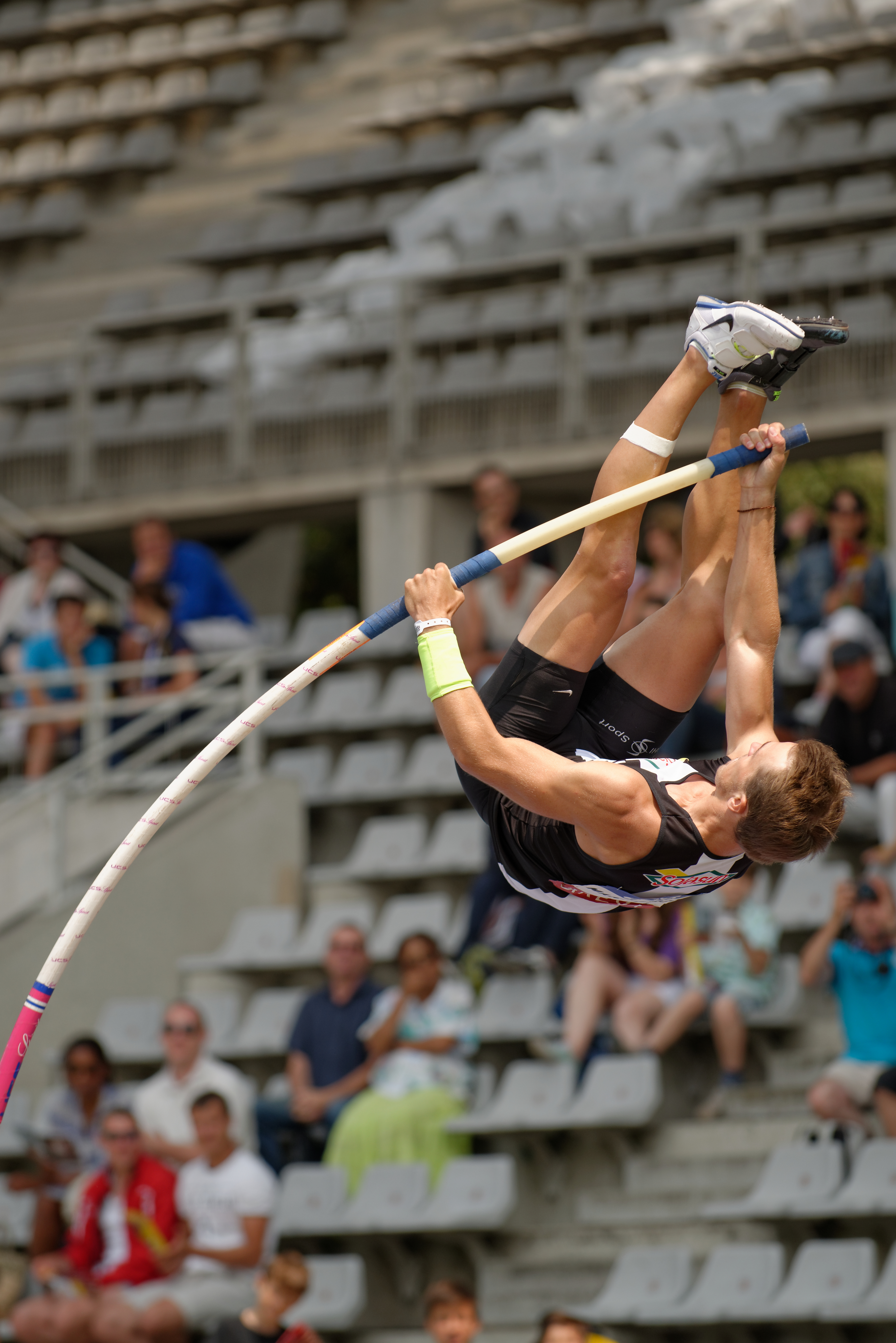
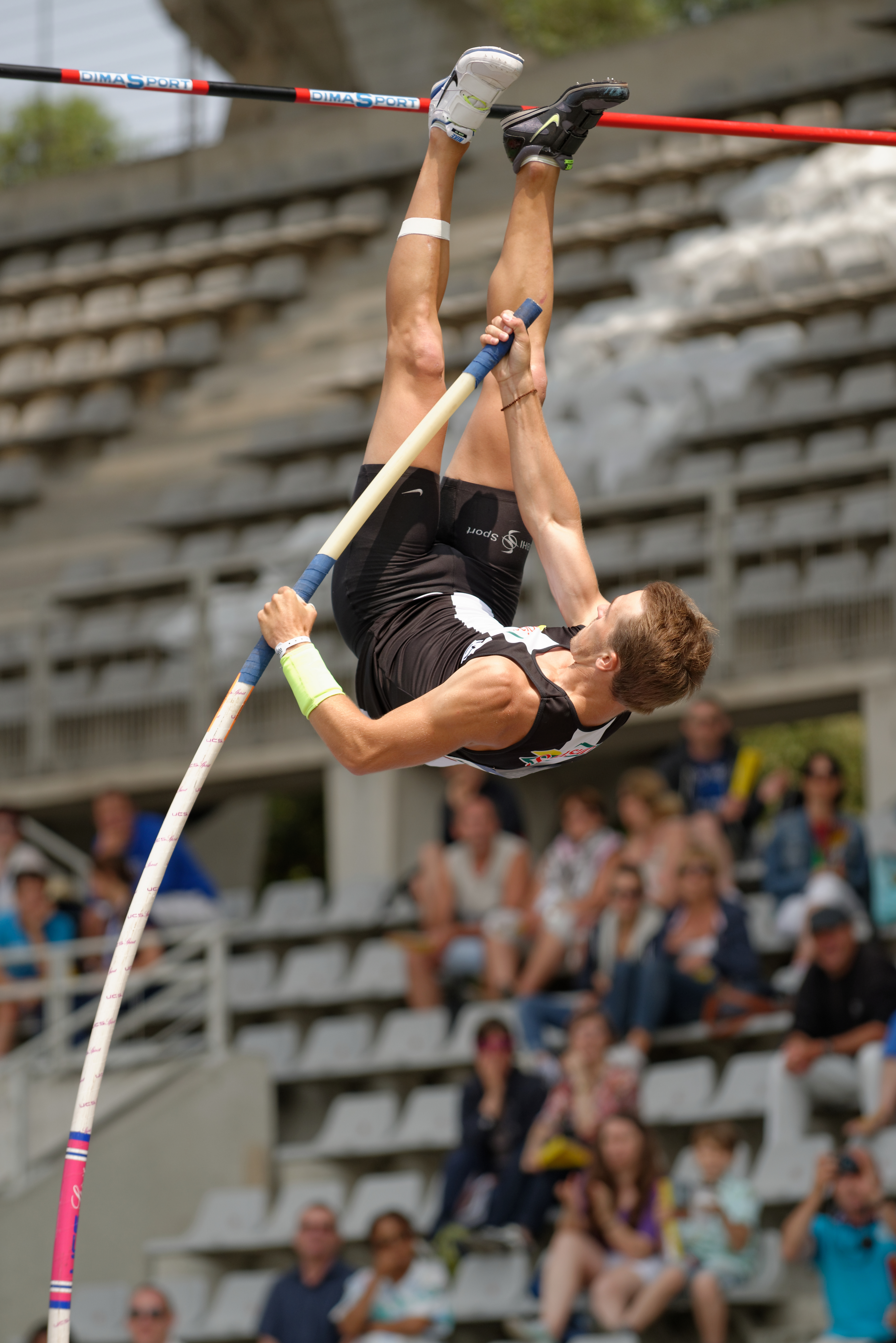
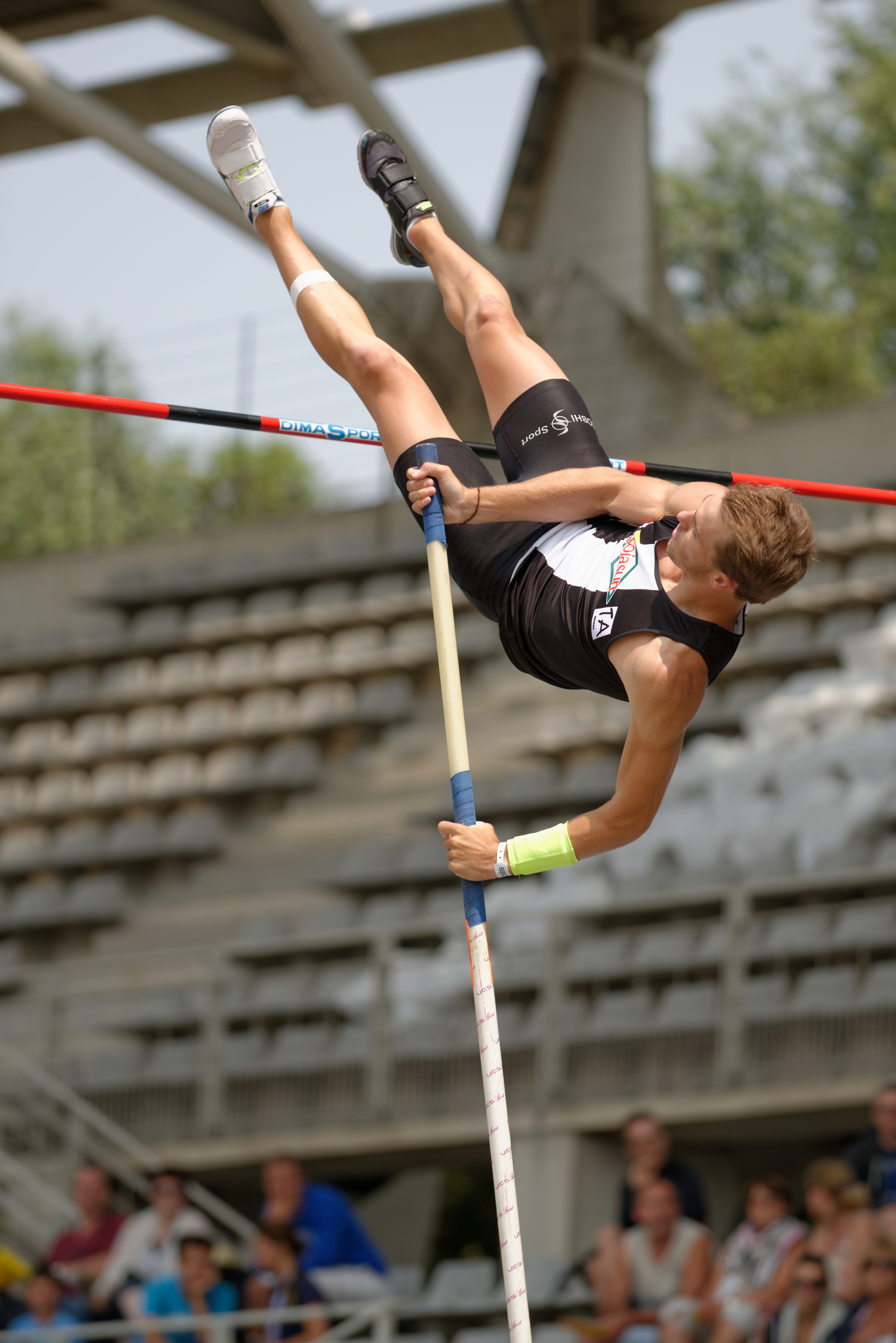
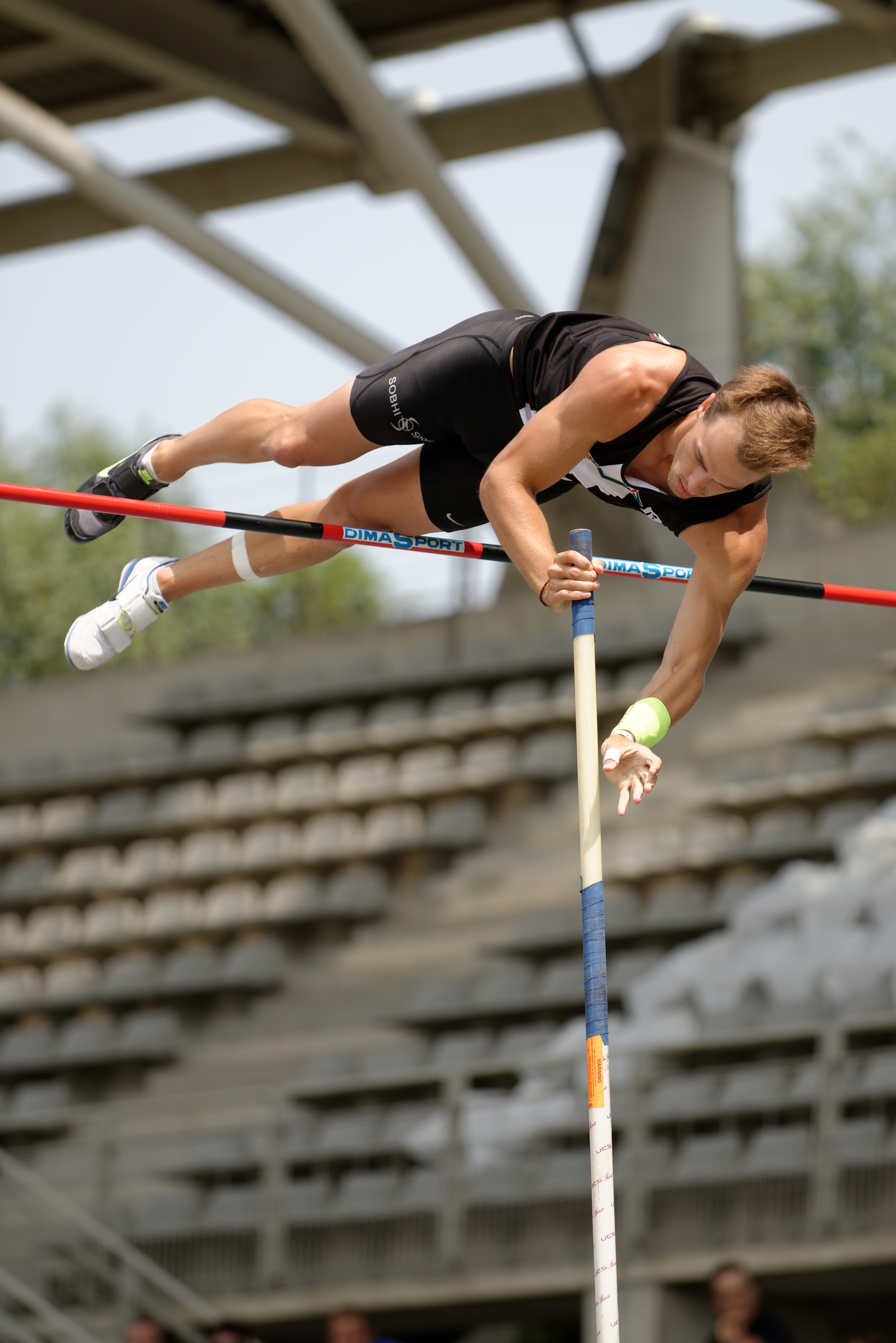
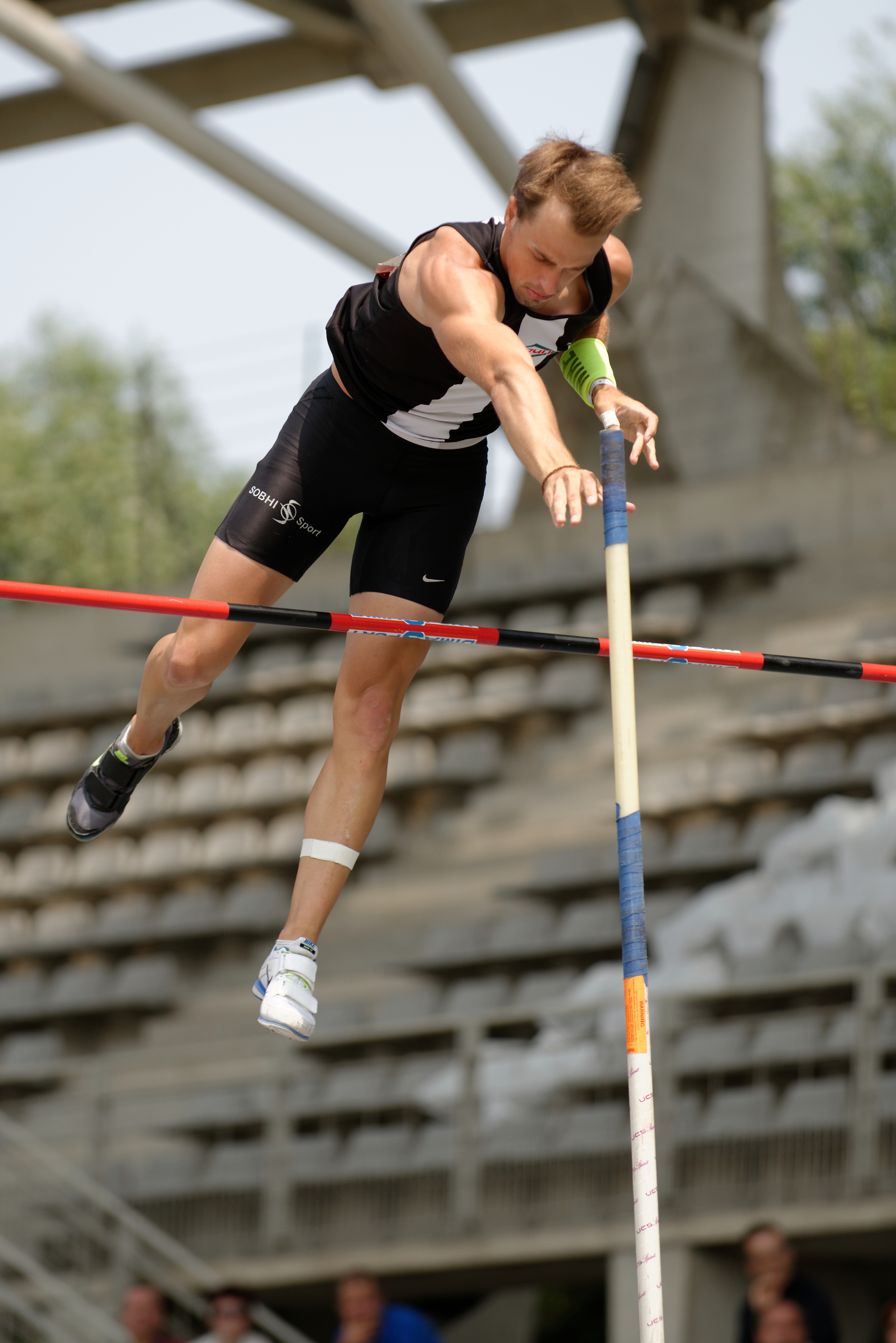
Théo Mancheron competes in the men's decathlon pole vault final during the French Athletics Championships 2013 at Stade Charléty in Paris, 13 July 2013.

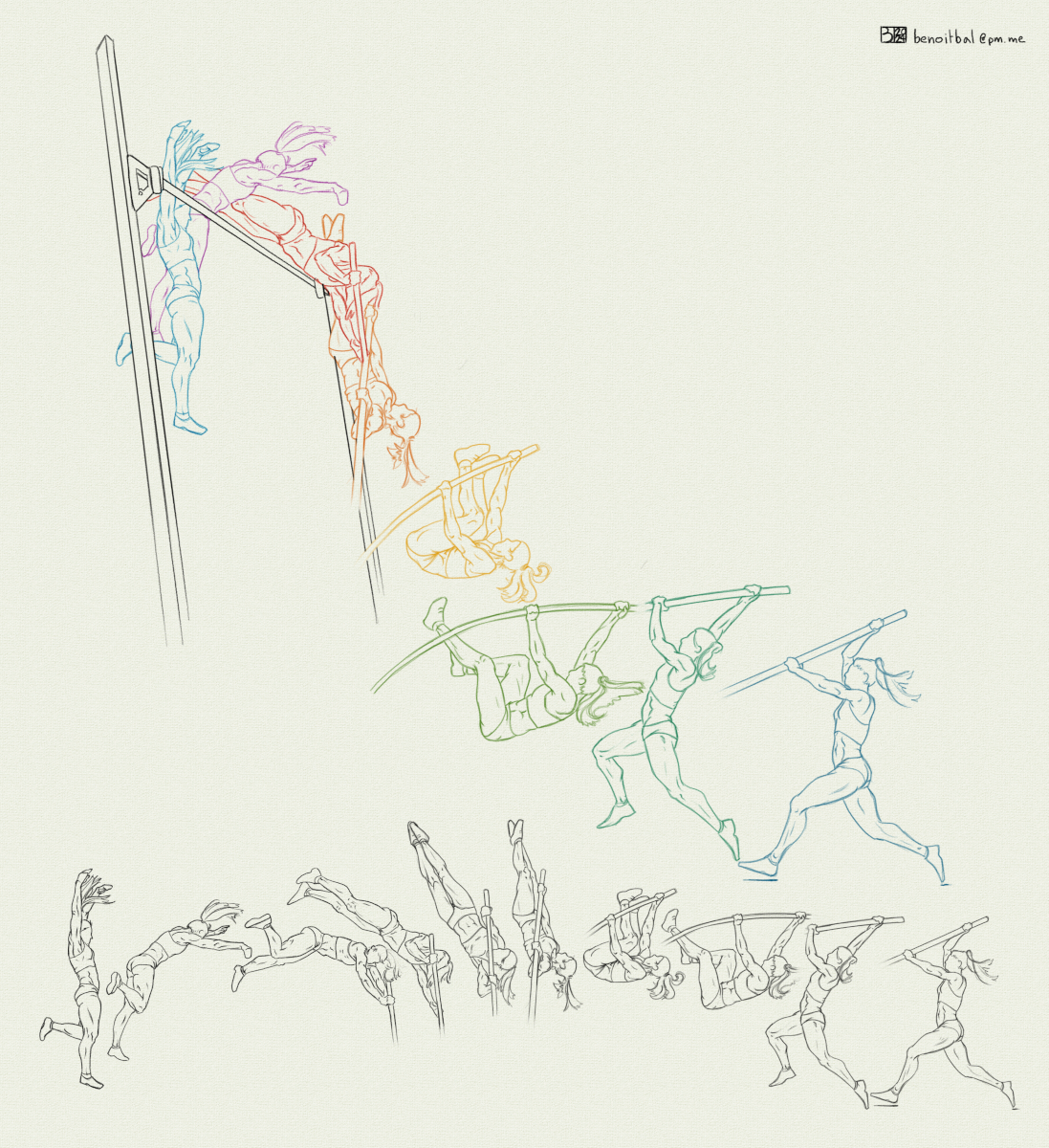
Pole-vaulting phases

Although many techniques are used by vaulters at various skill levels to clear the bar, the generally accepted technical model can be broken down into several phases.

=== Approach ===
During the approach the pole vaulter sprints down the runway in such a way as to achieve maximum speed and correct position to initiate takeoff at the end of the approach. A tape measure is laid on the runway so vaulters know exactly where to start their run from. Each vaulter has a certain starting distance, dependent on how many steps away from the box they start. Top class vaulters use approaches with 18 to 22 strides, often referred to as a "step" in which every other foot is counted as one step. For example when a vaulter takes 18 strides, it would be referred to as a 9-step, as 22 strides would be an 11-step. The run-up to the vaulting pit begins forcefully with the vaulter running powerfully in a relaxed, upright position with knees lifted and torso leaning very slightly forward. Right handed vaulters will start with a step back with their right foot before starting the run, left handed vaulters with their left back to begin. The head, shoulders and hips are aligned, the vaulter increasing speed as the body becomes erect. The tip of the vaulting pole is angled higher than eye level until three paces from takeoff, when the pole tip descends efficiently, amplifying run speed as the pole is planted into the vault box. The faster the vaulter can run and the more efficient their take-off is, the greater the kinetic energy that can be achieved and used during the vault.

=== Plant and take-off ===
The plant and take-off is initiated typically three steps out from the final step. Vaulters will usually count their steps backwards from their starting point to the box only counting the steps taken on the left foot (vice versa for left-handers). For example, a vaulter on a "ten count" (referring to the number of counted steps from the starting point to the box) would count backwards from ten, only counting the steps taken with the left foot. These last three steps are normally quicker than the previous strides and are referred to as the "turn-over". The goal of this phase is to efficiently translate the kinetic energy accumulated from the approach into potential energy stored by the elasticity of the pole, and to gain as much initial vertical height as possible by jumping off the ground. The plant starts with the vaulter raising their arms up from around the hips or mid-torso until they are fully outstretched above the head, with the right arm extended directly above the head and the left arm extended perpendicular to the pole (vice versa for left-handed vaulters). At the same time, the vaulter is dropping the pole tip into the box. On the final step, the vaulter jumps off the trail leg which should always remain straight and then drives the front knee forward. As the pole slides into the back of the box the pole begins to bend and the vaulter continues up and forward, leaving the trail leg angled down and behind, the body in a backwards 'C' position.

=== Swing up ===
The swing and row simply consists of the vaulter swinging the trail leg forward and rowing the pole, bringing the top arm down to the hips, while trying to keep the trail leg straight to store more potential energy into the pole, the rowing motion also keeps the pole bent for a longer period of time for the vaulter to get into optimum position. When parallel to the pole the left arm hugs the pole tight to efficiently use the recoil within the pole. The goal is to carry out these motions as thoroughly and as quickly as possible; it is a race against the unbending of the pole. Effectively, this causes a double pendulum motion, with the top of the pole moving forward and pivoting from the box, while the vaulter acts as a second pendulum pivoting from the right hand. This action gives the vaulter the best position possible to be "ejected" off the pole. The swing continues until the hips are above the head and the arms are pulling the pole close to the chest; from there the vaulter shoots their legs up over the cross bar while keeping the pole close.

=== Extension ===
The extension refers to the extension of the hips upward with outstretched legs as the shoulders drive down, causing the vaulter to be positioned upside down. This position is often referred to as "inversion". While this phase is executed, the pole begins to recoil, propelling the vaulter quickly upward. The hands of the vaulter remain close to the body as they move from the shins back to the region around the hips and upper torso.

=== Turn ===
The turn is executed immediately during the end of the rockback. As the name implies, the vaulter turns 180° toward the pole while extending the arms down past the head and shoulders. Typically the vaulter will begin to angle their body toward the bar as the turn is executed, although ideally the vaulter will remain as vertical as possible. The motion of the vaulter can be described as a spin around an imaginary axis from head to toe.

=== Fly-away ===
This is often highly emphasized by spectators and novice vaulters, but it is the easiest phase of the vault and is a result of proper execution of previous phases. This phase mainly consists of the vaulter pushing off the pole and releasing it so the pole falls away from the crossbar and mats. As the torso goes over and around the crossbar, the vaulter is facing the crossbar. Rotation of the body over the bar occurs naturally, and the vaulter's main concern is making sure that his arms, face and any other appendages do not knock the bar off as they go over. Vaulters aim to whip their upper torso around the top of the cross bar to ensure their elbows and face do not knock it off. The elite vaulter's center of gravity passes underneath the crossbar when they have their hips in the highest position like the crotch of an upside-down 'V'. The vaulter should land near the middle of the foam landing mats, or pit, face up. Landing on the feet or stomach first may lead to injuries or other problems.

== Terminology ==
Bar
The cross bar that is suspended above the ground by the standards.
Box
A trapezoidal indentation in the ground with a metal or fiberglass covering at the end of the runway in which vaulters "plant" their pole. The back wall of the box is nearly vertical and is approximately 8 inches (20 cm) in depth. The bottom of the box gradually slopes upward approximately 3 feet (90 cm) until it is level with the runway. The covering in the box ensures the pole will slide to the back of the box without catching on anything. The covering's lip overlaps onto the runway and ensures a smooth transition from all-weather surface so a pole being planted does not catch on the box.
Drive knee
During the plant phase, the knee is driven forward at the time of "takeoff" to help propel the vaulter upward.
Grip
The location of the vaulter's top hand on the pole. As the vaulter improves, their grip may move up the pole incrementally. The other hand is typically placed shoulder-width down from the top hand. Hands are not allowed to grip the very top of the pole (their hand perpendicular to the pole) for safety reasons.
Jump foot
The foot that the vaulter uses to leave the ground as they begin their vault. It is also referred to as the take-off foot.
Pit
The mats used for landing in pole vault.
Plant position
The position a vaulter is in the moment the pole reaches the back of the box and the vaulter begins their vault. Their arms are fully extended and their drive knee begins to come up as they jump.
Pole
The fiberglass equipment used to propel the vaulter up and over the bar. One side is stiffer than the other to facilitate the bending of the pole after the plant. A vaulter may rest the pole on their arm to determine which side is the stiff side.
Standards
The equipment that holds the bar at a particular height above the ground. Standards may be adjusted to raise and lower the bar and also to adjust the horizontal position of the bar.
Steps
Since the box is in a fixed position, vaulters must adjust their approach to ensure they are in the correct position when attempting to vault.
Swing leg or trail leg
The swing leg is also the jump foot. After a vaulter has left the ground, the leg that was last touching the ground stays extended and swings forward to help propel the vaulter upwards.
Volzing
A method of holding or pushing the bar back onto the pegs while jumping over a height. This takes considerable skill, although it is now against the rules and counted as a miss. The technique is named after U.S. Olympian Dave Volz, who made an art form of the practice and surprised many by making the U.S. Olympic team in 1992.

== Area records ==
- Updated 4 August 2026.

Area	Men			Women		
Area	Mark	Season	Athlete	Mark	Season	Athlete
World	6.31 m (20 ft 8 1/4 in) i	2026	Armand Duplantis (SWE)	5.06 m (16 ft 7 in)	2009	Yelena Isinbayeva (RUS)
Area records
Africa (records)	6.03 m (19 ft 9 1/4 in)	1995	Okkert Brits (RSA)	4.50 m (14 ft 9 in)	2026	Ansume de Beer (RSA)
Asia (records)	6.00 m (19 ft 8 in)	2023	Ernest John Obiena (PHI)	4.73 m (15 ft 6 in)	2026	Niu Chunge (CHN)
Asia (records)	6.00 m (19 ft 8 in)	2023	Ernest John Obiena (PHI)	4.73 m (15 ft 6 in)	2026	Niu Chunge (CHN)
Europe (records)	6.31 m (20 ft 8 1/4 in) i	2026	Armand Duplantis (SWE)	5.06 m (16 ft 7 in)	2009	Yelena Isinbayeva (RUS)
North, Central America and Caribbean (records)	6.07 m (19 ft 10 3/4 in)	2023	KC Lightfoot (USA)	5.03 m (16 ft 6 in) i	2016	Jennifer Suhr (USA)
Oceania (records)	6.06 m (19 ft 10 1/2 in) i	2009	Steve Hooker (AUS)	4.95 m (16 ft 2 3/4 in)	2026	Nina Kennedy (AUS)
South America (records)	6.03 m (19 ft 9 1/4 in)	2016	Thiago Braz (BRA)	4.87 m (15 ft 11 1/2 in)	2016	Fabiana Murer (BRA)

== All-time top 25 ==
Tables show data for two definitions of "Top 25" - the top 25 pole vault marks and the top 25 athletes:
- denotes top performance for athletes in the top 25 pole vault marks
- denotes lesser performances, still in the top 25 pole vault marks, by repeat athletes
- denotes top performance (only) for other top 25 athletes who fall outside the top 25 pole vault marks

- As of September 2026.

=== Men (outdoor) ===
Ath.#	Perf.#	Mark	Athlete	Nation	Date	Place	Ref.
1	1	6.30 m (20 ft 8 in)	Armand Duplantis	Sweden	15 September 2025	Tokyo	
	2	6.29 m (20 ft 7 1/2 in)	Duplantis #2		12 August 2025	Budapest	
	3	6.28 m (20 ft 7 in)	Duplantis #3		15 June 2025	Stockholm	
	4	6.26 m (20 ft 6 1/4 in)	Duplantis #4		25 August 2024	Chorzów	
	5	6.25 m (20 ft 6 in)	Duplantis #5		5 August 2024	Saint-Denis	
	5	6.25 m (20 ft 6 in)	Duplantis #6		27 August 2026	Zurich	
	7	6.24 m (20 ft 5 1/2 in)	Duplantis #7		20 April 2024	Xiamen	
	8	6.23 m (20 ft 5 1/4 in)	Duplantis #8		17 September 2023	Eugene	
	9	6.21 m (20 ft 4 1/4 in)	Duplantis #9		24 July 2022	Eugene	
	9	6.21 m (20 ft 4 1/4 in)	Duplantis #10		20 August 2026	Lausanne	
	11	6.20 m (20 ft 4 in)	Duplantis #11		23 August 2026	Chorzów	
2	11	6.20 m (20 ft 4 in)	Emmanouil Karalis	Greece	27 August 2026	Zurich	
	11	6.20 m (20 ft 4 in)	Duplantis #12		11 September 2026	Budapest	
	14	6.16 m (20 ft 2 1/2 in)	Duplantis #13		30 June 2022	Stockholm	
	14	6.16 m (20 ft 2 1/2 in)	Karalis #2		20 August 2026	Lausanne	
	16	6.15 m (20 ft 2 in)	Duplantis #14		17 September 2020	Rome	
	16	6.15 m (20 ft 2 in)	Duplantis #15		21 August 2024	Lausanne	
	16	6.15 m (20 ft 2 in)	Duplantis #16		12 June 2025	Oslo	
	16	6.15 m (20 ft 2 in)	Duplantis #17		16 August 2026	Birmingham	
	16	6.15 m (20 ft 2 in)	Karalis #3		11 September 2026	Budapest	
3	21	6.14 m (20 ft 1 1/2 in) A	Sergey Bubka	Ukraine	31 July 1994	Sestriere	
	22	6.13 m (20 ft 1 1/4 in)	Bubka #2		19 September 1992	Tokyo	
	22	6.13 m (20 ft 1 1/4 in)	Duplantis #18		24 June 2025	Ostrava	
	22	6.13 m (20 ft 1 1/4 in)	Duplantis #19		28 June 2026	Paris	
	25	6.12 m (20 ft 3/4 in)	Bubka #3		30 August 1992	Padua	
	25	6.12 m (20 ft 3/4 in)	Duplantis #20		27 June 2023	Ostrava	
	25	6.12 m (20 ft 3/4 in)	Duplantis #21		16 May 2026	Shanghai	
	25	6.12 m (20 ft 3/4 in)	Karalis #4		4 September 2026	Brussels	
4		6.07 m (19 ft 10 3/4 in)	KC Lightfoot	United States	2 June 2023	Nashville	
5		6.06 m (19 ft 10 1/2 in)	Sam Kendricks	United States	27 July 2019	Des Moines	
6		6.05 m (19 ft 10 in)	Maksim Tarasov	Russia	16 June 1999	Athens	
6		6.05 m (19 ft 10 in)	Dmitri Markov	Australia	9 August 2001	Edmonton	
6		6.05 m (19 ft 10 in)	Renaud Lavillenie	France	30 May 2015	Eugene	
9		6.04 m (19 ft 9 3/4 in)	Brad Walker	United States	8 June 2008	Eugene	
10		6.03 m (19 ft 9 1/4 in)	Okkert Brits	South Africa	18 August 1995	Cologne	
10		6.03 m (19 ft 9 1/4 in)	Jeff Hartwig	United States	14 June 2000	Jonesboro	
10		6.03 m (19 ft 9 1/4 in)	Thiago Braz	Brazil	15 August 2016	Rio de Janeiro	
13		6.02 m (19 ft 9 in)	Piotr Lisek	Poland	12 July 2019	Monaco	
14		6.01 m (19 ft 8 1/2 in)	Igor Trandenkov	Russia	3 July 1996	St. Petersburg	
14		6.01 m (19 ft 8 1/2 in)	Timothy Mack	United States	18 September 2004	Monaco	
14		6.01 m (19 ft 8 1/2 in)	Yevgeny Lukyanenko	Russia	1 July 2008	Bydgoszcz	
14		6.01 m (19 ft 8 1/2 in)	Björn Otto	Germany	5 September 2012	Aachen	
18		6.00 m (19 ft 8 in)	Radion Gataullin	Soviet Union	16 September 1989	Tokyo	
18		6.00 m (19 ft 8 in)	Tim Lobinger	Germany	24 August 1997	Cologne	
18		6.00 m (19 ft 8 in)	Toby Stevenson	United States	8 May 2004	Modesto	
18		6.00 m (19 ft 8 in)	Paul Burgess	Australia	26 February 2005	Perth	
18		6.00 m (19 ft 8 in)	Steve Hooker	Australia	27 January 2008	Perth	
18		6.00 m (19 ft 8 in)	Timur Morgunov	Authorised Neutral Athletes	12 August 2018	Berlin	
18		6.00 m (19 ft 8 in)	Chris Nilsen	United States	6 May 2022	Sioux Falls	
18		6.00 m (19 ft 8 in)	Ernest John Obiena	Philippines	10 June 2023	Bergen	
18		6.00 m (19 ft 8 in)	Kurtis Marschall	Australia	14 July 2026	Budapest	
18		6.00 m (19 ft 8 in)	Sondre Guttormsen	Norway	24 July 2026	Trondheim	

=== Women (outdoor) ===
Ath.#	Perf.#	Mark	Athlete	Nation	Date	Place	Ref.
1	1	5.06 m (16 ft 7 in)	Yelena Isinbayeva	Russia	28 August 2009	Zürich	
	2	5.05 m (16 ft 6 3/4 in)	Isinbayeva #2		18 August 2008	Beijing	
	3	5.04 m (16 ft 6 1/4 in)	Isinbayeva #3		29 July 2008	Monaco	
	4	5.03 m (16 ft 6 in)	Isinbayeva #4		11 July 2008	Rome	
	5	5.01 m (16 ft 5 in)	Isinbayeva #5		12 August 2005	Helsinki	
2	5	5.01 m (16 ft 5 in)	Anzhelika Sidorova	Authorised Neutral Athletes	9 September 2021	Zürich	
	7	5.00 m (16 ft 4 3/4 in)	Isinbayeva #6		22 July 2005	London	
3	7	5.00 m (16 ft 4 3/4 in)	Sandi Morris	United States	9 September 2016	Brussels	
	9	4.96 m (16 ft 3 1/4 in)	Isinbayeva #7		22 July 2005	London	
	10	4.95 m (16 ft 2 3/4 in)	Isinbayeva #8		16 July 2005	Madrid	
	10	4.95 m (16 ft 2 3/4 in)	Morris #2		27 July 2018	Greenville	
	10	4.95 m (16 ft 2 3/4 in)	Sidorova #2		29 September 2019	Doha	
4	10	4.95 m (16 ft 2 3/4 in)	Katie Nageotte	United States	26 June 2021	Eugene	
4	10	4.95 m (16 ft 2 3/4 in)	Nina Kennedy	Australia	10 July 2026	Monaco	
6	15	4.94 m (16 ft 2 1/4 in)	Eliza McCartney	New Zealand	17 July 2018	Jockgrim	
	16	4.93 m (16 ft 2 in)	Isinbayeva #9		5 July 2005	Lausanne	
	16	4.93 m (16 ft 2 in)	Isinbayeva #10		26 August 2005	Brussels	
	16	4.93 m (16 ft 2 in)	Isinbayeva #11		25 July 2008	London	
	16	4.93 m (16 ft 2 in)	Morris #3		23 July 2016	Houston	
7	16	4.93 m (16 ft 2 in)	Jennifer Suhr	United States	14 April 2018	Austin	
	16	4.93 m (16 ft 2 in)	Nageotte #2		23 May 2021	Marietta	
	22	4.92 m (16 ft 1 1/2 in)	Isinbayeva #12		3 September 2004	Brussels	
	22	4.92 m (16 ft 1 1/2 in)	Suhr #2		6 July 2008	Eugene	
	22	4.92 m (16 ft 1 1/2 in)	McCartney #2		23 June 2018	Mannheim	
	22	4.92 m (16 ft 1 1/2 in)	Nageotte #3		1 August 2020	Marietta	
8	22	4.92 m (16 ft 1 1/2 in)	Molly Caudery	Great Britain	22 June 2024	Toulouse	
9		4.91 m (16 ft 1 1/4 in)	Yarisley Silva	Cuba	2 August 2015	Beckum	
9		4.91 m (16 ft 1 1/4 in)	Katerina Stefanidi	Greece	6 August 2017	London	
9		4.91 m (16 ft 1 1/4 in)	Polina Knoroz	Russia	20 June 2026	Cheboksary	
9		4.91 m (16 ft 1 1/4 in)	Hana Moll	United States	5 September 2026	Brussels	
13		4.90 m (16 ft 3/4 in)	Holly Bradshaw	Great Britain	26 June 2021	Manchester	
14		4.88 m (16 ft 0 in)	Svetlana Feofanova	Russia	4 July 2004	Herakleion	
14		4.88 m (16 ft 0 in)	Angelica Moser	Switzerland	12 July 2024	Monaco	
16		4.87 m (15 ft 11 1/2 in)	Fabiana Murer	Brazil	3 July 2016	São Bernardo do Campo	
17		4.85 m (15 ft 10 3/4 in)	Wilma Murto	Finland	17 August 2022	Munich	
17		4.85 m (15 ft 10 3/4 in)	Alysha Newman	Canada	7 August 2024	Paris	
19		4.84 m (15 ft 10 1/2 in)	Amanda Moll	United States	11 June 2026	Eugene	
20		4.83 m (15 ft 10 in)	Stacy Dragila	United States	8 June 2004	Ostrava	
20		4.83 m (15 ft 10 in)	Anna Rogowska	Poland	26 August 2005	Brussels	
20		4.83 m (15 ft 10 in)	Nikoleta Kyriakopoulou	Greece	4 July 2015	Paris	
20		4.83 m (15 ft 10 in)	Michaela Meijer	Sweden	1 August 2020	Norrköping	
24		4.82 m (15 ft 9 3/4 in)	Monika Pyrek	Poland	22 September 2007	Stuttgart	
24		4.82 m (15 ft 9 3/4 in)	Silke Spiegelburg	Germany	20 July 2012	Monaco	

=== Men (indoor) ===
Ath.#	Perf.#	Mark	Athlete	Nation	Date	Place	Ref.
1	1	6.31 m (20 ft 8 1/4 in)	Armand Duplantis	Sweden	12 March 2026	Uppsala	
	2	6.27 m (20 ft 6 3/4 in)	Duplantis #2		28 February 2025	Clermont-Ferrand	
	3	6.25 m (20 ft 6 in)	Duplantis #3		21 March 2026	Toruń	
	4	6.22 m (20 ft 4 3/4 in)	Duplantis #4		25 February 2023	Clermont-Ferrand	
	5	6.20 m (20 ft 4 in)	Duplantis #5		20 March 2022	Belgrade	
	6	6.19 m (20 ft 3 1/2 in)	Duplantis #6		7 March 2022	Belgrade	
	7	6.18 m (20 ft 3 1/4 in)	Duplantis #7		15 February 2020	Glasgow	
	8	6.17 m (20 ft 2 3/4 in)	Duplantis #8		8 February 2020	Toruń	
2	8	6.17 m (20 ft 2 3/4 in)	Emmanouil Karalis	Greece	28 February 2026	Paiania	
3	10	6.16 m (20 ft 2 1/2 in)	Renaud Lavillenie	France	15 February 2014	Donetsk	
4	11	6.15 m (20 ft 2 in)	Sergey Bubka	Ukraine	21 February 1993	Donetsk	
	11	6.15 m (20 ft 2 in)	Duplantis #9		22 March 2025	Nanjing	
	13	6.14 m (20 ft 1 1/2 in)	Bubka #2		13 February 1993	Liévin	
	14	6.13 m (20 ft 1 1/4 in)	Bubka #3		21 February 1992	Berlin	
	15	6.12 m (20 ft 3/4 in)	Bubka #4		23 March 1991	Grenoble	
	16	6.11 m (20 ft 1/2 in)	Bubka #5		19 March 1991	Donetsk	
	17	6.10 m (20 ft 0 in)	Bubka #6		15 March 1991	San Sebastián	
	17	6.10 m (20 ft 0 in)	Duplantis #10		24 February 2021	Belgrade	
	17	6.10 m (20 ft 0 in)	Duplantis #11		2 February 2023	Uppsala	
	17	6.10 m (20 ft 0 in)	Duplantis #12		14 February 2025	Berlin	
	21	6.08 m (19 ft 11 1/4 in)	Bubka #7		9 February 1991	Volgograd	
	21	6.08 m (19 ft 11 1/4 in)	Lavillenie #2		31 January 2014	Bydgoszcz	
	23	6.07 m (19 ft 10 3/4 in)	Duplantis #13		19 February 2020	Liévin	
5	24	6.06 m (19 ft 10 1/2 in)	Steve Hooker	Australia	7 February 2009	Boston	
	24	6.06 m (19 ft 10 1/2 in)	Lavillenie #3		27 February 2021	Aubière	
	24	6.06 m (19 ft 10 1/2 in)	Duplantis #14		10 February 2023	Berlin	
	24	6.06 m (19 ft 10 1/2 in)	Duplantis #15		22 February 2026	Clermont-Ferrand	
	24	6.06 m (19 ft 10 1/2 in)	Karalis #2		7 March 2026	Rouen	
5	24	6.06 m (19 ft 10 1/2 in)	Sondre Guttormsen	Norway	7 March 2026	Rouen	
7		6.05 m (19 ft 10 in)	Chris Nilsen	United States	5 March 2022	Rouen	
8		6.02 m (19 ft 9 in)	Radion Gataullin	Soviet Union	4 February 1989	Gomel	
8		6.02 m (19 ft 9 in)	Jeff Hartwig	United States	10 March 2002	Sindelfingen	
10		6.01 m (19 ft 8 1/2 in)	Sam Kendricks	United States	8 February 2020	Rouen	
10		6.01 m (19 ft 8 1/2 in)	Matvei Volkov	Belarus	20 February 2026	Mogilev	
10		6.01 m (19 ft 8 1/2 in)	Zach Bradford	USA	28 February 2026	Staten Island	
13		6.00 m (19 ft 8 in)	Maksim Tarasov	Russia	5 February 1999	Budapest	
13		6.00 m (19 ft 8 in)	Jean Galfione	France	6 March 1999	Maebashi	
13		6.00 m (19 ft 8 in)	Danny Ecker	Germany	11 February 2001	Dortmund	
13		6.00 m (19 ft 8 in) A	Shawnacy Barber	Canada	15 January 2016	Reno	
13		6.00 m (19 ft 8 in)	Piotr Lisek	Poland	4 February 2017	Potsdam	
13		6.00 m (19 ft 8 in)	KC Lightfoot	United States	13 February 2021	Lubbock	
13		6.00 m (19 ft 8 in)	Kurtis Marschall	Australia	21 February 2026	Clermont-Ferrand	
20		5.96 m (19 ft 6 1/2 in)	Lawrence Johnson	United States	3 March 2001	Atlanta	
20		5.96 m (19 ft 6 1/2 in)	Menno Vloon	Netherlands	27 February 2021	Aubière	
22		5.95 m (19 ft 6 1/4 in)	Tim Lobinger	Germany	18 February 2000	Chemnitz	
22		5.95 m (19 ft 6 1/4 in)	Thiago Braz	Brazil	20 March 2022	Belgrade	
24		5.94 m (19 ft 5 3/4 in)	Philippe Collet	France	10 March 1990	Grenoble	
25		5.93 m (19 ft 5 1/4 in)	Billy Olson	United States	8 February 1986	East Rutherford	
25		5.93 m (19 ft 5 1/4 in)	Tye Harvey	United States	3 March 2001	Atlanta	
25		5.93 m (19 ft 5 1/4 in)	Ernest John Obiena	Philippines	23 February 2024	Berlin	

=== Women (indoor) ===
Ath.#	Perf.#	Mark	Athlete	Nation	Date	Place	Ref.
1	1	5.03 m (16 ft 6 in)	Jennifer Suhr	United States	30 January 2016	Brockport	
	2	5.02 m (16 ft 5 1/2 in) A	Suhr #2		2 March 2013	Albuquerque	
2	3	5.01 m (16 ft 5 in)	Yelena Isinbayeva	Russia	23 February 2012	Stockholm	
	4	5.00 m (16 ft 4 3/4 in)	Isinbayeva #2		15 February 2009	Donetsk	
	5	4.97 m (16 ft 3 1/2 in)	Isinbayeva #3		15 February 2009	Donetsk	
	6	4.95 m (16 ft 2 3/4 in)	Isinbayeva #4		16 February 2008	Donetsk	
3	6	4.95 m (16 ft 2 3/4 in)	Sandi Morris	United States	12 March 2016	Portland	
	6	4.95 m (16 ft 2 3/4 in)	Morris #2		3 March 2018	Birmingham	
3	6	4.95 m (16 ft 2 3/4 in)	Anzhelika Sidorova	Authorised Neutral Athletes	29 February 2020	Moscow	
5	10	4.94 m (16 ft 2 1/4 in)	Katie Nageotte	United States	11 June 2021	Marietta	
	11	4.93 m (16 ft 2 in)	Isinbayeva #5		10 February 2007	Donetsk	
	12	4.92 m (16 ft 1 1/2 in)	Sidorova #2		25 February 2020	Moscow	
	13	4.91 m (16 ft 1 1/4 in)	Isinbayeva #6		12 February 2006	Donetsk	
	13	4.91 m (16 ft 1 1/4 in)	Suhr #3		16 January 2016	Kent	
	13	4.91 m (16 ft 1 1/4 in) A	Nageotte #2		18 February 2018	Albuquerque	
	13	4.91 m (16 ft 1 1/4 in)	Sidorova #3		8 February 2019	Madrid	
	13	4.91 m (16 ft 1 1/4 in)	Morris #3		8 February 2020	New York City	
6	13	4.91 m (16 ft 1 1/4 in)	Nina Kennedy	Australia	30 August 2023	Zürich	
6	13	4.91 m (16 ft 1 1/4 in)	Amanda Moll	United States	28 February 2025	Indiananpolis	
	20	4.90 m (16 ft 3/4 in)	Isinbayeva #7		6 March 2005	Madrid	
	20	4.90 m (16 ft 3/4 in)	Isinbayeva #8		26 February 2009	Prague	
8	20	4.90 m (16 ft 3/4 in)	Katerina Stefanidi	Greece	20 February 2016	New York City	
8	20	4.90 m (16 ft 3/4 in)	Demi Payne	United States	20 February 2016	New York City	
	20	4.90 m (16 ft 3/4 in)	Suhr #4		12 March 2016	Portland	
	20	4.90 m (16 ft 3/4 in)	Suhr #5		17 March 2016	Portland	
	20	4.90 m (16 ft 3/4 in) A	Morris #4		12 January 2018	Reno	
	20	4.90 m (16 ft 3/4 in)	Sidorova #4		3 March 2018	Birmingham	
	20	4.90 m (16 ft 3/4 in) A	Morris #5		15 February 2020	Albuquerque	
	20	4.90 m (16 ft 3/4 in)	Sidorova #5		21 February 2021	Moscow	
10		4.88 m (16 ft 0 in)	Hana Moll	United States	30 January 2026	Seattle	
11		4.87 m (15 ft 11 1/2 in)	Holly Bradshaw	Great Britain	20 January 2012	Villeurbanne	
12		4.86 m (15 ft 11 1/4 in)	Molly Caudery	Great Britain	24 February 2024	Rouen	
13		4.85 m (15 ft 10 3/4 in)	Svetlana Feofanova	Russia	22 February 2004	Peania	
13		4.85 m (15 ft 10 3/4 in)	Anna Rogowska	Poland	6 March 2011	Paris	
15		4.84 m (15 ft 10 1/2 in)	Eliza McCartney	New Zealand	10 February 2024	Liévin	
16		4.83 m (15 ft 10 in)	Fabiana Murer	Brazil	7 February 2015	Nevers	
16		4.83 m (15 ft 10 in)	Alysha Newman	Canada	22 February 2024	Clermont-Ferrand	
16		4.83 m (15 ft 10 in)	Bridget Williams	United States	22 February 2024	Clemont-Ferrand	
19		4.82 m (15 ft 9 3/4 in)	Yarisley Silva	Cuba	24 April 2013	Des Moines	
19		4.82 m (15 ft 9 3/4 in)	Tina Šutej	Slovenia	2 February 2023	Ostrava	
21		4.81 m (15 ft 9 1/4 in)	Stacy Dragila	United States	6 March 2004	Budapest	
21		4.81 m (15 ft 9 1/4 in)	Nikoleta Kyriakopoulou	Greece	17 February 2016	Stockholm	
21		4.81 m (15 ft 9 1/4 in)	Angelica Bengtsson	Sweden	24 February 2019	Clermont-Ferrand	
21		4.81 m (15 ft 9 1/4 in)	Polina Knoroz	Authorised Neutral Athletes	19 February 2022	Clermont-Ferrand	
21		4.81 m (15 ft 9 1/4 in)	Wilma Murto	Finland	6 January 2024	Kuortane	

== Six metres club ==
The "six metres club" consists of pole vaulters who have reached at least 6.00 m (19 ft 8 in). In 1985, Sergey Bubka became the first pole vaulter to clear six metres.

Mark	Athlete	Nation	Outdoors	Indoors	Season first cleared 6 metres
6.31	Armand Duplantis	Sweden	6.30	6.31	2018
6.20	Emmanouil Karalis	Greece	6.20	6.17	2024
6.16	Renaud Lavillenie	France	6.05	6.16	2009
6.15	Sergey Bubka	Soviet Union / Ukraine	6.14	6.15	1985
6.07	KC Lightfoot	United States	6.07	6.00	2021
6.06	Steve Hooker	Australia	6.00	6.06	2008
6.06	Sam Kendricks	United States	6.06	6.01	2017
6.06	Sondre Guttormsen	Norway	6.00	6.06	2023
6.05	Maksim Tarasov	Russia	6.05	6.00	1997
6.05	Dmitri Markov	Belarus / Australia	6.05	5.85	1998
6.05	Chris Nilsen	United States	6.00	6.05	2022
6.04	Brad Walker	United States	6.04	5.86	2006
6.03	Okkert Brits	South Africa	6.03	5.90	1995
6.03	Jeff Hartwig	United States	6.03	6.02	1998
6.03	Thiago Braz	Brazil	6.03	5.95	2016
6.02	Radion Gataullin	Soviet Union / Russia	6.00	6.02	1989
6.02	Piotr Lisek	Poland	6.02	6.00	2017
6.01	Igor Trandenkov	Russia	6.01	5.90	1996
6.01	Timothy Mack	United States	6.01	5.85	2004
6.01	Yevgeny Lukyanenko	Russia	6.01	5.90	2008
6.01	Björn Otto	Germany	6.01	5.92	2012
6.01	Matvei Volkov	Belarus	5.77	6.01	2026
6.01	Zach Bradford	United States	5.95	6.01	2026
6.00	Tim Lobinger	Germany	6.00	5.95	1997
6.00	Jean Galfione	France	5.98	6.00	1999
6.00	Danny Ecker	Germany	5.93	6.00	2001
6.00	Toby Stevenson	United States	6.00	5.81	2004
6.00	Paul Burgess	Australia	6.00	5.80	2005
6.00	Shawnacy Barber	Canada	5.93	6.00	2016
6.00	Timur Morgunov	Authorised Neutral Athletes	6.00	5.91	2018
6.00	Ernest John Obiena	Philippines	6.00	5.93	2023
6.00	Kurtis Marschall	Australia	6.00	6.00	2026

== Five metres club ==
Four women have cleared 5 metres. Yelena Isinbayeva was the first to clear 5.00 m (16 ft 4 3/4 in) on 22 July 2005. On 2 March 2013, Jennifer Suhr cleared 5.02 m (16 ft 5 1/2 in) indoors to become the second. Sandi Morris cleared 5.00 m (16 ft 4 3/4 in) on 9 September 2016, to become the third. Anzhelika Sidorova cleared 5.01 m (16 ft 5 in) at the Diamond League final in Zürich on 9 September 2021.

Mark	Athlete	Nation	Outdoors	Indoors	Season first cleared 5 metres
5.06	Yelena Isinbayeva	Russia	5.06	5.01	2005
5.03	Jennifer Suhr	United States	4.93	5.03	2013
5.01	Anzhelika Sidorova	Authorised Neutral Athletes	5.01	4.95	2021
5.00	Sandi Morris	United States	5.00	4.95	2016

== Milestones ==
This is a list of the first time a milestone mark was cleared.

Mark	Athlete	Nation	Date
8 ft (2.44 m)	John Roper	Great Britain	17 April 1843
9 ft (2.75 m)	Robert Dixon	Great Britain	15 November 1848
10 ft (3.05 m)	Robert Musgrave	Great Britain	17 April 1854
11 ft (3.36 m)	Edwin Woodburn	Great Britain	21 July 1876
12 ft (3.66 m)	Norman Dole	United States	23 April 1904
13 ft (3.96 m)	Robert Gardner	United States	1 June 1912
4 m (13 ft 1 1/2 in)	Marc Wright	United States	8 June 1912
14 ft (4.27 m)	Sabin Carr	United States	27 May 1927
4.5 m (14 ft 9 in)	William Sefton	United States	29 May 1937
15 ft (4.57 m)	Cornelius "Dutch" Warmerdam	United States	13 April 1940
16 ft (4.88 m)	John Uelses	United States	31 March 1962
5 m (16 ft 5 in)	Brian Sternberg	United States	27 April 1963
17 ft (5.18 m)	John Pennel	United States	24 August 1963
18 ft (5.49 m)	Christos Papanikolaou	Greece	24 October 1970
5.5 m (18 ft 1/2 in)	Kjell Isaksson	Sweden	8 April 1972
19 ft (5.79 m)	Thierry Vigneron	France	20 June 1981
6 m (19 ft 8 in)	Sergey Bubka	Soviet Union	13 July 1985
20 ft (6.10 m)	Sergey Bubka	Soviet Union	16 March 1991 (indoors); 5 August 1991 (outdoors)
6.20 m (20 ft 4 in)	Armand Duplantis	Sweden	20 March 2022
6.30 m (20 ft 8 in)	Armand Duplantis	Sweden	15 September 2025

This is a list of the first-time milestones for women.

Mark	Athlete	Nation	Date
4 m (13 ft 1 1/2 in)	Zhang Chunzhen	China	24 March 1991
14 ft (4.27 m)	Emma George	Australia	17 December 1995
4.5 m (14 ft 9 in)	Emma George	Australia	8 February 1997
15 ft (4.57 m)	Emma George	Australia	14 March 1998
16 ft (4.88 m)	Svetlana Feofanova	Russia	4 July 2004
5 m (16 ft 5 in)	Yelena Isinbayeva	Russia	22 July 2005

== Olympic medalists ==
=== Men ===
Games	Gold	Silver	Bronze
1896 Athens	William Hoyt; United States	Albert Tyler; United States	Evangelos Damaskos; Greece
1896 Athens	William Hoyt; United States	Albert Tyler; United States	Ioannis Theodoropoulos; Greece
1900 Paris	Irving Baxter; United States	Meredith Colket; United States	Carl Albert Andersen; Norway
1904 St. Louis	Charles Dvorak; United States	LeRoy Samse; United States	Louis Wilkins; United States
1908 London	Edward Cook; United States	none awarded	Edward Archibald; Canada
1908 London	Edward Cook; United States	none awarded	Clare Jacobs; United States
1908 London	Alfred Gilbert; United States	none awarded	Clare Jacobs; United States
1908 London	Alfred Gilbert; United States	none awarded	Bruno Söderström; Sweden
1912 Stockholm	Harry Babcock; United States	Frank Nelson; United States	William Halpenny; Canada
1912 Stockholm	Harry Babcock; United States	Frank Nelson; United States	Frank Murphy; United States
1912 Stockholm	Harry Babcock; United States	Marc Wright; United States	Frank Murphy; United States
1912 Stockholm	Harry Babcock; United States	Marc Wright; United States	Bertil Uggla; Sweden
1920 Antwerp	Frank Foss; United States	Henry Petersen; Denmark	Edwin Myers; United States
1924 Paris	Lee Barnes; United States	Glenn Graham; United States	James Brooker; United States
1928 Amsterdam	Sabin Carr; United States	William Droegemueller; United States	Charles McGinnis; United States
1932 Los Angeles	Bill Miller; United States	Shuhei Nishida; Japan	George Jefferson; United States
1936 Berlin	Earle Meadows; United States	Shuhei Nishida; Japan	Sueo Ōe; Japan
1948 London	Guinn Smith; United States	Erkki Kataja; Finland	Bob Richards; United States
1952 Helsinki	Bob Richards; United States	Don Laz; United States	Ragnar Lundberg; Sweden
1956 Melbourne	Bob Richards; United States	Bob Gutowski; United States	Georgios Roubanis; Greece
1960 Rome	Don Bragg; United States	Ron Morris; United States	Eeles Landström; Finland
1964 Tokyo	Fred Hansen; United States	Wolfgang Reinhardt; United Team of Germany	Klaus Lehnertz; United Team of Germany
1968 Mexico City	Bob Seagren; United States	Claus Schiprowski; West Germany	Wolfgang Nordwig; East Germany
1972 Munich	Wolfgang Nordwig; East Germany	Bob Seagren; United States	Jan Johnson; United States
1976 Montreal	Tadeusz Ślusarski; Poland	Antti Kalliomäki; Finland	David Roberts; United States
1980 Moscow	Władysław Kozakiewicz; Poland	Tadeusz Ślusarski; Poland	none awarded
1980 Moscow	Władysław Kozakiewicz; Poland	Konstantin Volkov; Soviet Union	none awarded
1984 Los Angeles	Pierre Quinon; France	Mike Tully; United States	Earl Bell; United States
1984 Los Angeles	Pierre Quinon; France	Mike Tully; United States	Thierry Vigneron; France
1988 Seoul	Sergey Bubka; Soviet Union	Radion Gataullin; Soviet Union	Grigoriy Yegorov; Soviet Union
1992 Barcelona	Maksim Tarasov; Unified Team	Igor Trandenkov; Unified Team	Javier García; Spain
1996 Atlanta	Jean Galfione; France	Igor Trandenkov; Russia	Andrei Tivontchik; Germany
2000 Sydney	Nick Hysong; United States	Lawrence Johnson; United States	Maksim Tarasov; Russia
2004 Athens	Timothy Mack; United States	Toby Stevenson; United States	Giuseppe Gibilisco; Italy
2008 Beijing	Steve Hooker; Australia	Yevgeny Lukyanenko; Russia	Derek Miles; United States
2012 London	Renaud Lavillenie; France	Björn Otto; Germany	Raphael Holzdeppe; Germany
2016 Rio de Janeiro	Thiago Braz; Brazil	Renaud Lavillenie; France	Sam Kendricks; United States
2020 Tokyo	Armand Duplantis; Sweden	Chris Nilsen; United States	Thiago Braz; Brazil
2024 Paris	Armand Duplantis; Sweden	Sam Kendricks; United States	Emmanouil Karalis; Greece
2028 Los Angeles			

=== Women ===
Games	Gold	Silver	Bronze
2000 Sydney	Stacy Dragila; United States	Tatiana Grigorieva; Australia	Vala Flosadóttir; Iceland
2004 Athens	Yelena Isinbayeva; Russia	Svetlana Feofanova; Russia	Anna Rogowska; Poland
2008 Beijing	Yelena Isinbayeva; Russia	Jennifer Stuczynski; United States	Svetlana Feofanova; Russia
2012 London	Jennifer Suhr; United States	Yarisley Silva; Cuba	Yelena Isinbayeva; Russia
2016 Rio de Janeiro	Katerina Stefanidi; Greece	Sandi Morris; United States	Eliza McCartney; New Zealand
2020 Tokyo	Katie Nageotte; United States	Anzhelika Sidorova; ROC	Holly Bradshaw; Great Britain
2024 Paris	Nina Kennedy; Australia	Katie Moon; United States	Alysha Newman; Canada
2028 Los Angeles			

== World Championships medalists ==
=== Men ===
Championships	Gold	Silver	Bronze
1983 Helsinki	Sergey Bubka (URS)	Konstantin Volkov (URS)	Atanas Tarev (BUL)
1987 Rome	Sergey Bubka (URS)	Thierry Vigneron (FRA)	Radion Gataullin (URS)
1991 Tokyo	Sergey Bubka (URS)	István Bagyula (HUN)	Maksim Tarasov (URS)
1993 Stuttgart	Sergey Bubka (UKR)	Grigoriy Yegorov (KAZ)	Maksim Tarasov (RUS) Igor Trandenkov (RUS)
1995 Gothenburg	Sergey Bubka (UKR)	Maksim Tarasov (RUS)	Jean Galfione (FRA)
1997 Athens	Sergey Bubka (UKR)	Maksim Tarasov (RUS)	Dean Starkey (USA)
1999 Seville	Maksim Tarasov (RUS)	Dmitri Markov (AUS)	Aleksandr Averbukh (ISR)
2001 Edmonton	Dmitri Markov (AUS)	Aleksandr Averbukh (ISR)	Nick Hysong (USA)
2003 Saint-Denis	Giuseppe Gibilisco (ITA)	Okkert Brits (RSA)	Patrik Kristiansson (SWE)
2005 Helsinki	Rens Blom (NED)	Brad Walker (USA)	Pavel Gerasimov (RUS)
2007 Osaka	Brad Walker (USA)	Romain Mesnil (FRA)	Danny Ecker (GER)
2009 Berlin	Steve Hooker (AUS)	Romain Mesnil (FRA)	Renaud Lavillenie (FRA)
2011 Daegu	Paweł Wojciechowski (POL)	Lázaro Borges (CUB)	Renaud Lavillenie (FRA)
2013 Moscow	Raphael Holzdeppe (GER)	Renaud Lavillenie (FRA)	Björn Otto (GER)
2015 Beijing	Shawnacy Barber (CAN)	Raphael Holzdeppe (GER)	Renaud Lavillenie (FRA) Pawel Wojciechowski (POL) Piotr Lisek (POL)
2017 London	Sam Kendricks (USA)	Piotr Lisek (POL)	Renaud Lavillenie (FRA)
2019 Doha	Sam Kendricks (USA)	Armand Duplantis (SWE)	Piotr Lisek (POL)
2022 Eugene	Armand Duplantis (SWE)	Christopher Nilsen (USA)	Ernest John Obiena (PHL)
2023 Budapest	Armand Duplantis (SWE)	Ernest John Obiena (PHL)	Kurtis Marschall (AUS) Christopher Nilsen (USA)
2025 Tokyo	Armand Duplantis (SWE)	Emmanouil Karalis (GRE)	Kurtis Marschall (AUS)

=== Women ===
Championships	Gold	Silver	Bronze
1999 Seville	Stacy Dragila (USA)	Anzhela Balakhonova (UKR)	Tatiana Grigorieva (AUS)
2001 Edmonton	Stacy Dragila (USA)	Svetlana Feofanova (RUS)	Monika Pyrek (POL)
2003 Saint-Denis	Svetlana Feofanova (RUS)	Annika Becker (GER)	Yelena Isinbayeva (RUS)
2005 Helsinki	Yelena Isinbayeva (RUS)	Monika Pyrek (POL)	Pavla Hamáčková (CZE)
2007 Osaka	Yelena Isinbayeva (RUS)	Kateřina Baďurová (CZE)	Svetlana Feofanova (RUS)
2009 Berlin	Anna Rogowska (POL)	Chelsea Johnson (USA) Monika Pyrek (POL)	none awarded
2011 Daegu	Fabiana Murer (BRA)	Martina Strutz (GER)	Svetlana Feofanova (RUS)
2013 Moscow	Yelena Isinbayeva (RUS)	Jenn Suhr (USA)	Yarisley Silva (CUB)
2015 Beijing	Yarisley Silva (CUB)	Fabiana Murer (BRA)	Nikoleta Kyriakopoulou (GRE)
2017 London	Ekaterini Stefanidi (GRE)	Sandi Morris (USA)	Robeilys Peinado (VEN) Yarisley Silva (CUB)
2019 Doha	Anzhelika Sidorova (ANA)	Sandi Morris (USA)	Katerina Stefanidi (GRE)
2022 Eugene	Katie Nageotte (USA)	Sandi Morris (USA)	Nina Kennedy (AUS)
2023 Budapest	Katie Moon (USA) Nina Kennedy (AUS)	none awarded	Wilma Murto (FIN)
2025 Tokyo	Katie Moon (USA)	Sandi Morris (USA)	Tina Šutej (SLO)

== World Indoor Championships medalists ==
=== Men ===
Games	Gold	Silver	Bronze
1985 Paris^{[A]}	Sergei Bubka (URS)	Thierry Vigneron (FRA)	Vasiliy Bubka (URS)
1987 Indianapolis	Sergei Bubka (URS)	Earl Bell (USA)	Thierry Vigneron (FRA)
1989 Budapest	Radion Gataullin (URS)	Grigoriy Yegorov (URS)	Joe Dial (USA)
1991 Seville	Sergei Bubka (URS)	Viktor Ryzhenkov (URS)	Ferenc Salbert (FRA)
1993 Toronto	Radion Gataullin (RUS)	Grigoriy Yegorov (KAZ)	Jean Galfione (FRA)
1995 Barcelona	Sergei Bubka (UKR)	Igor Potapovich (KAZ)	Okkert Brits (RSA) Andrei Tivontchik (GER)
1997 Paris	Igor Potapovich (KAZ)	Lawrence Johnson (USA)	Maksim Tarasov (RUS)
1999 Maebashi	Jean Galfione (FRA)	Jeff Hartwig (USA)	Danny Ecker (GER)
2001 Lisbon	Lawrence Johnson (USA)	Tye Harvey (USA)	Romain Mesnil (FRA)
2003 Birmingham	Tim Lobinger (GER)	Michael Stolle (GER)	Rens Blom (NED)
2004 Budapest	Igor Pavlov (RUS)	Adam Ptáček (CZE)	Denys Yurchenko (UKR)
2006 Moscow	Brad Walker (USA)	Alhaji Jeng (SWE)	Tim Lobinger (GER)
2008 Valencia	Yevgeny Lukyanenko (RUS)	Brad Walker (USA)	Steve Hooker (AUS)
2010 Doha	Steve Hooker (AUS)	Malte Mohr (GER)	Alexander Straub (GER)
2012 Istanbul	Renaud Lavillenie (FRA)	Björn Otto (GER)	Brad Walker (USA)
2014 Sopot	Konstadinos Filippidis (GRE)	Malte Mohr (GER)	Jan Kudlička (CZE)
2016 Portland	Renaud Lavillenie (FRA)	Sam Kendricks (USA)	Piotr Lisek (POL)
2018 Birmingham	Renaud Lavillenie (FRA)	Sam Kendricks (USA)	Piotr Lisek (POL)
2022 Belgrade	Armand Duplantis (SWE)	Thiago Braz (BRA)	Chris Nilsen (USA)
2024 Glasgow	Armand Duplantis (SWE)	Sam Kendricks (USA)	Emmanouil Karalis (GRE)
2025 Nanjing	Armand Duplantis (SWE)	Emmanouil Karalis (GRE)	Sam Kendricks (USA)
2026 Toruń	Armand Duplantis (SWE)	Emmanouil Karalis (GRE)	Kurtis Marschall (AUS)

- ^{^{A}} Known as the World Indoor Games

=== Women ===
Games	Gold	Silver	Bronze
1997 Paris	Stacy Dragila (USA)	Emma George (AUS)	Cai Weiyan (CHN)
1999 Maebashi	Nastja Ryshich (GER)	Vala Flosadóttir (ISL)	Nicole Humbert (GER) Zsuzsanna Szabó-Olgyai (HUN)
2001 Lisbon	Pavla Hamáčková (CZE)	Svetlana Feofanova (RUS) Kellie Suttle (USA)	none awarded
2003 Birmingham	Svetlana Feofanova (RUS)	Yelena Isinbayeva (RUS)	Monika Pyrek (POL)
2004 Budapest	Yelena Isinbayeva (RUS)	Stacy Dragila (USA)	Svetlana Feofanova (RUS)
2006 Moscow	Yelena Isinbayeva (RUS)	Anna Rogowska (POL)	Svetlana Feofanova (RUS)
2008 Valencia	Yelena Isinbayeva (RUS)	Jennifer Stuczynski (USA)	Fabiana Murer (BRA) Monika Pyrek (POL)
2010 Doha	Fabiana Murer (BRA)	Svetlana Feofanova (RUS)	Anna Rogowska (POL)
2012 Istanbul	Yelena Isinbayeva (RUS)	Vanessa Boslak (FRA)	Holly Bleasdale (GBR)
2014 Sopot	Yarisley Silva (CUB)	Anzhelika Sidorova (RUS) Jiřina Svobodová (CZE)	none awarded
2016 Portland	Jennifer Suhr (USA)	Sandi Morris (USA)	Katerina Stefanidi (GRE)
2018 Birmingham	Sandi Morris (USA)	Anzhelika Sidorova (ANA)	Katerina Stefanidi (GRE)
2022 Belgrade	Sandi Morris (USA)	Katie Moon (USA)	Tina Šutej (SLO)
2024 Glasgow	Molly Caudery (GBR)	Eliza McCartney (NZL)	Katie Moon (USA)
2025 Nanjing	Marie-Julie Bonnin (FRA)	Tina Šutej (SLO)	Angelica Moser (SUI)
2026 Toruń	Molly Caudery (GBR)	Tina Šutej (SLO)	Amálie Švábíková (CZE) Imogen Ayris (NZL) Angelica Moser (SUI)

== World leading marks ==
=== Men ===
Year	Mark	Athlete	Place
1970	5.49 m (18 ft 0 in)	Christos Papanikolaou (GRE)	Athens
1971	5.43 m (17 ft 9 3/4 in)	Kjell Isaksson (SWE)	Siena
1972	5.63 m (18 ft 5 1/2 in)	Bob Seagren (USA)	Eugene
1973	5.49 m (18 ft 0 in)	Steve Smith (USA)	New York City
1974	5.53 m (18 ft 1 1/2 in) A	Steve Smith (USA)	Pocatello
1975	5.65 m (18 ft 6 1/4 in)	David Roberts (USA)	Gainesville
1976	5.70 m (18 ft 8 1/4 in)	David Roberts (USA)	Eugene
1977	5.66 m (18 ft 6 3/4 in)	Władysław Kozakiewicz (POL)	Warsaw
1978	5.71 m (18 ft 8 3/4 in)	Mike Tully (USA)	Corvallis
1979	5.65 m (18 ft 6 1/4 in)	Patrick Abada (FRA)	Paris
1979	5.65 m (18 ft 6 1/4 in)	Philippe Houvion (FRA)	Paris
1980	5.78 m (18 ft 11 1/2 in)	Władysław Kozakiewicz (POL)	Moscow
1981	5.81 m (19 ft 1/2 in)	Vladimir Polyakov (URS)	Tbilisi
1982	5.75 m (18 ft 10 1/4 in)	Dave Volz (USA)	Nice
1982	5.75 m (18 ft 10 1/4 in)	Jean-Michel Bellot (FRA)	Colombes
1983	5.83 m (19 ft 1 1/2 in)	Thierry Vigneron (FRA)	Rome
1984	5.94 m (19 ft 5 3/4 in)	Sergey Bubka (URS)	Rome
1985	6.00 m (19 ft 8 in)	Sergey Bubka (URS)	Paris
1986	6.01 m (19 ft 8 1/2 in)	Sergey Bubka (URS)	Moscow
1987	6.03 m (19 ft 9 1/4 in)	Sergey Bubka (URS)	Prague
1988	6.06 m (19 ft 10 1/2 in)	Sergey Bubka (URS)	Nice
1989	6.03 m (19 ft 9 1/4 in) i	Sergey Bubka (URS)	Osaka
1990	6.05 m (19 ft 10 in) i	Sergey Bubka (URS)	Donetsk
1991	6.12 m (20 ft 3/4 in) i	Sergey Bubka (URS)	Grenoble
1992	6.13 m (20 ft 1 1/4 in)	Sergey Bubka (UKR)	Tokyo
1992	6.13 m (20 ft 1 1/4 in)	Sergey Bubka (UKR)	Berlin
1993	6.15 m (20 ft 2 in) i	Sergey Bubka (UKR)	Donetsk
1994	6.14 m (20 ft 1 1/2 in) A	Sergey Bubka (UKR)	Sestriere
1995	6.03 m (19 ft 9 1/4 in)	Okkert Brits (RSA)	Cologne
1996	6.02 m (19 ft 9 in)	Sergey Bubka (UKR)	Atlanta
1997	6.05 m (19 ft 10 in)	Sergey Bubka (UKR)	Fukuoka
1998	6.01 m (19 ft 8 1/2 in)	Jeff Hartwig (USA)	Uniondale
1999	6.05 m (19 ft 10 in)	Maxim Tarasov (RUS)	Athens
2000	6.03 m (19 ft 9 1/4 in)	Jeff Hartwig (USA)	Jonesboro
2001	6.05 m (19 ft 10 in)	Dmitriy Markov (AUS)	Edmonton
2002	6.02 m (19 ft 9 in) i	Jeff Hartwig (USA)	Sindelfingen
2003	5.95 m (19 ft 6 1/4 in)	Romain Mesnil (FRA)	Castres
2004	6.01 m (19 ft 8 1/2 in)	Timothy Mack (USA)	Monaco
2005	6.00 m (19 ft 8 in)	Paul Burgess (AUS)	Perth
2006	6.00 m (19 ft 8 in)	Brad Walker (USA)	Jockgrim
2007	5.95 m (19 ft 6 1/4 in)	Brad Walker (USA)	Brisbane
2008	6.04 m (19 ft 9 3/4 in)	Brad Walker (USA)	Eugene
2009	6.06 m (19 ft 10 1/2 in)	Steve Hooker (AUS)	Boston
2010	6.01 m (19 ft 8 1/2 in) i	Steve Hooker (AUS)	Doha
2011	6.03 m (19 ft 9 1/4 in) i	Renaud Lavillenie (FRA)	Paris
2012	6.01 m (19 ft 8 1/2 in)	Björn Otto (GER)	Aachen
2013	6.02 m (19 ft 9 in)	Renaud Lavillenie (FRA)	London
2014	6.16 m (20 ft 2 1/2 in) i	Renaud Lavillenie (FRA)	Donetsk
2015	6.05 m (19 ft 10 in)	Renaud Lavillenie (FRA)	Eugene
2016	6.03 m (19 ft 9 1/4 in)	Thiago Braz (BRA)	Rio de Janeiro
2016	6.03 m (19 ft 9 1/4 in) i	Renaud Lavillenie (FRA)	Jablonec
2017	6.00 m (19 ft 8 in) i	Piotr Lisek (POL)	Potsdam
2017	6.00 m (19 ft 8 in)	Sam Kendricks (USA)	Sacramento
2018	6.05 m (19 ft 10 in)	Armand Duplantis (SWE)	Berlin
2019	6.06 m (19 ft 10 1/2 in)	Sam Kendricks (USA)	Des Moines
2020	6.18 m (20 ft 3 1/4 in) i	Armand Duplantis (SWE)	Glasgow
2021	6.10 m (20 ft 0 in)	Armand Duplantis (SWE)	Hengelo
2022	6.21 m (20 ft 4 1/4 in)	Armand Duplantis (SWE)	Eugene
2023	6.23 m (20 ft 5 1/4 in)	Armand Duplantis (SWE)	Eugene
2024	6.26 m (20 ft 6 1/4 in)	Armand Duplantis (SWE)	Chorzów
2025	6.30 m (20 ft 8 in)	Armand Duplantis (SWE)	Tokyo
2026	6.31 m (20 ft 8 1/4 in) i	Armand Duplantis (SWE)	Uppsala

=== Women ===
Year	Mark	Athlete	Place
1991	4.05 m (13 ft 3 1/4 in)	Zhang Chunzhen (CHN)	Guangzhou
1992	4.05 m (13 ft 3 1/4 in)	Sun Caiyun (CHN)	Nanjing
1993	4.11 m (13 ft 5 3/4 in)	Sun Caiyun (CHN)	Guangzhou
1994	4.12 m (13 ft 6 in)	Sun Caiyun (CHN)	Guangzhou
1995	4.28 m (14 ft 1/2 in)	Emma George (AUS)	Perth
1996	4.45 m (14 ft 7 in)	Emma George (AUS)	Sapporo
1997	4.55 m (14 ft 11 in)	Emma George (AUS)	Melbourne
1998	4.59 m (15 ft 1/2 in)	Emma George (AUS)	Brisbane
1999	4.60 m (15 ft 1 in)	Emma George (AUS)	Sydney
1999	4.60 m (15 ft 1 in)	Stacy Dragila (USA)	Seville
2000	4.63 m (15 ft 2 1/4 in)	Stacy Dragila (USA)	Sacramento
2001	4.81 m (15 ft 9 1/4 in)	Stacy Dragila (USA)	Palo Alto
2002	4.78 m (15 ft 8 in)	Svetlana Feofanova (RUS)	Stockholm
2003	4.82 m (15 ft 9 3/4 in)	Yelena Isinbayeva (RUS)	Gateshead
2004	4.92 m (16 ft 1 1/2 in)	Yelena Isinbayeva (RUS)	Brussels
2005	5.01 m (16 ft 5 in)	Yelena Isinbayeva (RUS)	Helsinki
2006	4.91 m (16 ft 1 1/4 in)	Yelena Isinbayeva (RUS)	London
2006	4.91 m (16 ft 1 1/4 in)	Yelena Isinbayeva (RUS)	Donetsk
2007	4.93 m (16 ft 2 in) i	Yelena Isinbayeva (RUS)	Donetsk
2008	5.05 m (16 ft 6 3/4 in)	Yelena Isinbayeva (RUS)	Beijing
2009	5.06 m (16 ft 7 in)	Yelena Isinbayeva (RUS)	Zürich
2010	4.89 m (16 ft 1/2 in)	Jennifer Suhr (USA)	Des Moines
2011	4.91 m (16 ft 1 1/4 in)	Jennifer Suhr (USA)	Rochester
2012	5.01 m (16 ft 5 in) i	Yelena Isinbayeva (RUS)	Stockholm
2013	5.02 m (16 ft 5 1/2 in) i A	Jennifer Suhr (USA)	Albuquerque
2014	4.80 m (15 ft 8 3/4 in)	Fabiana Murer (BRA)	New York City
2015	4.91 m (16 ft 1 1/4 in)	Yarisley Silva (CUB)	Beckum
2016	5.03 m (16 ft 6 in) i	Jenn Suhr (USA)	Brockport
2017	4.91 m (16 ft 1 1/4 in)	Katerina Stefanidi (GRE)	London
2018	4.95 m (16 ft 2 3/4 in)	Sandi Morris (USA)	Greenville
2019	4.95 m (16 ft 2 3/4 in)	Anzhelika Sidorova (ANA)	Doha
2020	4.95 m (16 ft 2 3/4 in) i	Anzhelika Sidorova (ANA)	Moscow
2021	5.01 m (16 ft 5 in)	Anzhelika Sidorova (ANA)	Zürich
2022	4.85 m (15 ft 10 3/4 in)	Katie Moon (USA)	Eugene
2022	4.85 m (15 ft 10 3/4 in)	Sandi Morris (USA)	Eugene
2022	4.85 m (15 ft 10 3/4 in)	Wilma Murto (FIN)	Munich
2023	4.91 m (16 ft 1 1/4 in) i	Nina Kennedy (AUS)	Zürich
2024	4.92 m (16 ft 1 1/2 in)	Molly Caudery (GBR)	Toulouse
2025	4.91 m (16 ft 1 1/4 in) i	Amanda Moll (USA)	Indianapolis
2026	4.95 m (16 ft 2 3/4 in)	Nina Kennedy (AUS)	Monaco

== See also ==
- List of pole vault national champions (women)
