= Ed Cook (basketball) =

American basketball player and coach

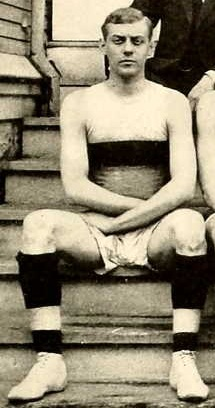
- Cook from The Arbutus, 1907

Playing career
- 1907–1908: Indiana
- Position: Forward

Coaching career (HC unless noted)
- 1908: Indiana
- 1911–1912: Franklin (IN)

Head coaching record
- Overall: 25–15

Edmund Charles Cook was an American basketball player and coach.

Cook was born in approximately 1888 and attended Manual Training High School in Indianapolis. He also played basketball at the German House. He enrolled at Indiana University in 1906 and played for the Indiana Hoosiers men's basketball team in the 1906–07 season and returned as a player in the 1907–08 season. After being declared academically ineligible, he took over as the head basketball coach for the 1907–08 season, compiling a record of 9–6. He later coached the basketball team at Franklin College in Franklin, Indiana for the 1910–11 and 1911–12 seasons, compiling a 25–16 record. He later became captain of the Third Christian basketball team.
