= Pole vault at the World Athletics Championships =

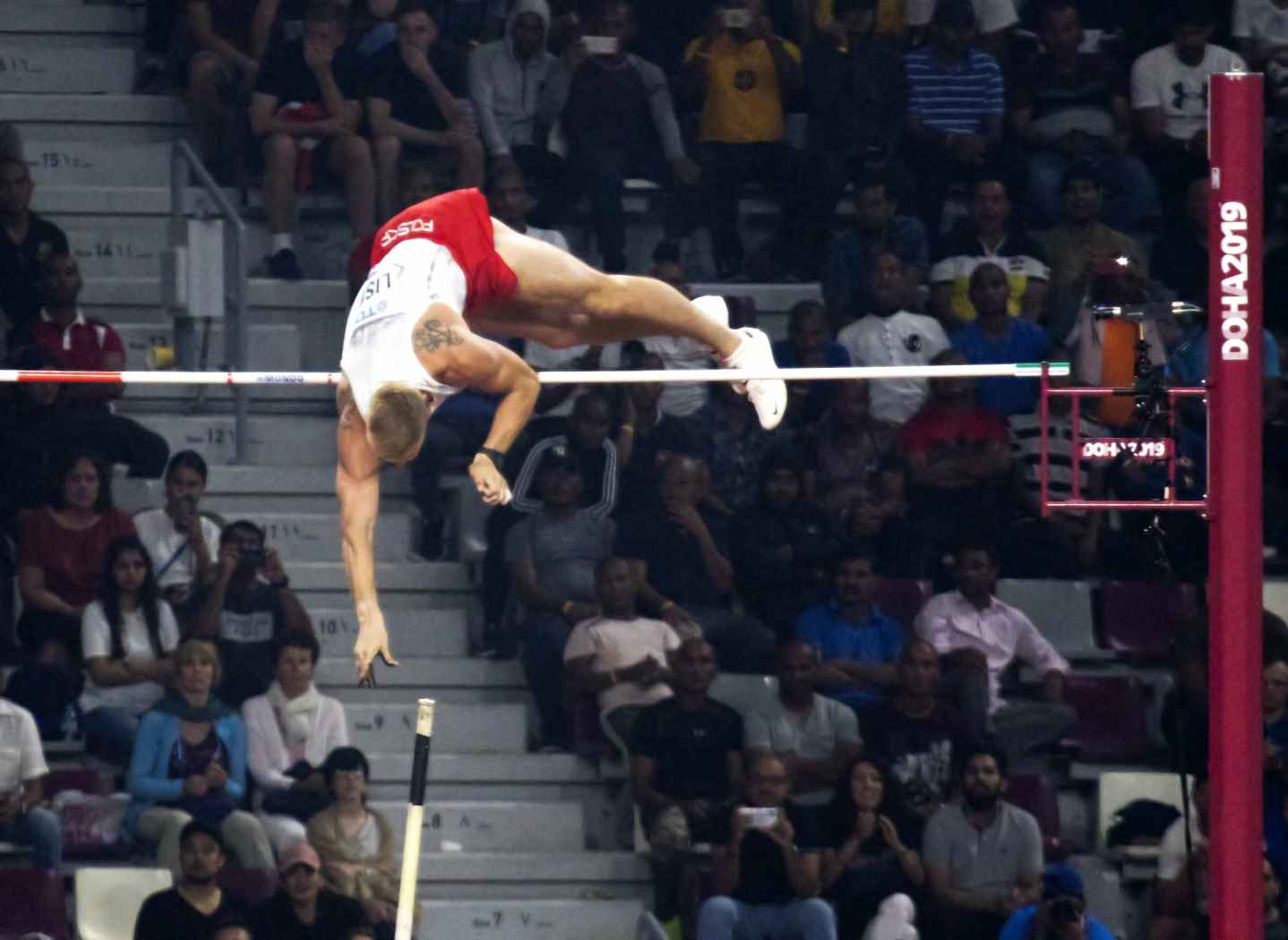
- Piotr Lisek competing in the 2019 final.

Overview
- Gender: Men and women
- Years held: Men: 1983 – 2025; Women: 1999 – 2025

Championship record
- Men: 6.30 m Armand Duplantis (2025)
- Women: 5.01 m Yelena Isinbayeva (2005)

Reigning champion
- Men: Armand Duplantis (SWE)
- Women: Katie Moon (USA)

The pole vault at the World Athletics Championships has been contested by men since 1983 and women since 1999. The competition format typically has one qualifying round contested by two groups of athletes, with all those clearing the qualifying height or placing in top twelve overall advancing to the final round.

The United States is the most successful nation in the event, winning a total of 17 medals, including 7 golds. Russia is the second-most successful nation, with 14 medals in total and 5 golds. The Soviet Union, Ukraine and Australia are the only two other nations that have won more than 2 gold medals. France is the most successful nation to have never won a gold medal, with 4 silvers and 5 bronzes, all in the men's event.

Sergey Bubka is the most successful athlete in the event, winning 6 gold medals in a row between the inaugural edition in 1983 and 1997. His 6 gold medals are more than any athlete has won in an individual event in World Athletics Championships history. Yelena Isinbayeva is the most successful athlete on the women's side, winning 3 gold and 1 bronze medal between 2003 and 2013. Four athletes have won two world titles: Sam Kendricks and Armand Duplantis on the men's side, and Stacy Dragila and Katie Moon on the women's side.

The championship records for the event are 6.21 for men, set by Armand Duplantis in 2022, and 5.01 m for women, set by Yelena Isinbayeva in 2005. The world record has been broken three times total at the World Championships: the men's record by Duplantis in 2022, and the women's record by Dragila and Isinbayeva in 1999 and 2005 respectively.

== Age records ==
- All information from World Athletics.

Distinction	Male			Female		
Distinction	Athlete	Age	Date	Athlete	Age	Date
Youngest champion	Sergey Bubka (URS)	19 years, 253 days	14 Aug 1983	Svetlana Feofanova (RUS)	23 years, 40 days	25 Aug 2003
Youngest medalist	Sergey Bubka (URS)	19 years, 253 days	14 Aug 1983	Robeilys Peinado (VEN)	19 years, 253 days	6 Aug 2017
Youngest finalist	Armand Duplantis (SWE)	17 years, 271 days	8 Aug 2017	Robeilys Peinado (VEN)	19 years, 253 days	6 Aug 2017
Youngest participant	Natan Rivera (ESA)	16 years, 253 days	22 Aug 2015	Vicky Parnov (AUS)	16 years, 306 days	26 Aug 2007
Oldest champion	Sergey Bubka (UKR)	33 years, 249 days	10 Aug 1997	Yelena Isinbayeva (RUS)	31 years, 71 days	13 Aug 2013
Oldest medalist	Björn Otto (GER)	35 years, 300 days	12 Aug 2013	Fabiana Murer (BRA)	31 years, 189 days	26 Aug 2015
Oldest finalist	Renaud Lavillenie (FRA)	39 years, 362 days	15 Sept 2025	Jenn Suhr (USA)	37 years, 236 days	29 Sep 2019
Oldest participant	Renaud Lavillenie (FRA)	39 years, 362 days	15 Sept 2025	Stacy Dragila (USA)	38 years, 143 days	15 Aug 2009

== Medalists ==
=== Men ===
Championships	Gold	Silver	Bronze
1983 Helsinki	Sergey Bubka (URS)	Konstantin Volkov (URS)	Atanas Tarev (BUL)
1987 Rome	Sergey Bubka (URS)	Thierry Vigneron (FRA)	Radion Gataullin (URS)
1991 Tokyo	Sergey Bubka (URS)	István Bagyula (HUN)	Maksim Tarasov (URS)
1993 Stuttgart	Sergey Bubka (UKR)	Grigoriy Yegorov (KAZ)	Maksim Tarasov (RUS) Igor Trandenkov (RUS)
1995 Gothenburg	Sergey Bubka (UKR)	Maksim Tarasov (RUS)	Jean Galfione (FRA)
1997 Athens	Sergey Bubka (UKR)	Maksim Tarasov (RUS)	Dean Starkey (USA)
1999 Seville	Maksim Tarasov (RUS)	Dmitri Markov (AUS)	Aleksandr Averbukh (ISR)
2001 Edmonton	Dmitri Markov (AUS)	Aleksandr Averbukh (ISR)	Nick Hysong (USA)
2003 Saint-Denis	Giuseppe Gibilisco (ITA)	Okkert Brits (RSA)	Patrik Kristiansson (SWE)
2005 Helsinki	Rens Blom (NED)	Brad Walker (USA)	Pavel Gerasimov (RUS)
2007 Osaka	Brad Walker (USA)	Romain Mesnil (FRA)	Danny Ecker (GER)
2009 Berlin	Steve Hooker (AUS)	Romain Mesnil (FRA)	Renaud Lavillenie (FRA)
2011 Daegu	Paweł Wojciechowski (POL)	Lázaro Borges (CUB)	Renaud Lavillenie (FRA)
2013 Moscow	Raphael Holzdeppe (GER)	Renaud Lavillenie (FRA)	Björn Otto (GER)
2015 Beijing	Shawnacy Barber (CAN)	Raphael Holzdeppe (GER)	Renaud Lavillenie (FRA) Pawel Wojciechowski (POL) Piotr Lisek (POL)
2017 London	Sam Kendricks (USA)	Piotr Lisek (POL)	Renaud Lavillenie (FRA)
2019 Doha	Sam Kendricks (USA)	Armand Duplantis (SWE)	Piotr Lisek (POL)
2022 Eugene	Armand Duplantis (SWE)	Christopher Nilsen (USA)	Ernest John Obiena (PHL)
2023 Budapest	Armand Duplantis (SWE)	Ernest John Obiena (PHL)	Kurtis Marschall (AUS) Christopher Nilsen (USA)
2025 Tokyo	Armand Duplantis (SWE)	Emmanouil Karalis (GRE)	Kurtis Marschall (AUS)

==== Multiple medalists ====
Rank	Athlete	Nation	Period	Gold	Silver	Bronze	Total
1	Sergey Bubka	Soviet Union (URS); Ukraine (UKR)	1983–1997	6	0	0	6
2	Armand Duplantis	Sweden (SWE)	2019-2025	3	1	0	4
3	Sam Kendricks	United States (USA)	2017–2019	2	0	0	2
4	Maksim Tarasov	Russia (RUS)	1991–1999	1	2	2	5
5	Dmitri Markov	Australia (AUS)	1999–2001	1	1	0	2
5	Brad Walker	United States (USA)	2005–2007	1	1	0	2
5	Raphael Holzdeppe	Germany (GER)	2013–2015	1	1	0	2
8	Paweł Wojciechowski	Poland (POL)	2011–2015	1	0	1	2
9	Renaud Lavillenie	France (FRA)	2009–2017	0	1	4	5
10	Piotr Lisek	Poland (POL)	2015–2019	0	1	2	3
11	Aleksandr Averbukh	Israel (ISR)	1999–2001	0	1	1	2
11	Christopher Nilsen	United States (USA)	2022-2023	0	1	1	2
11	Ernest John Obiena	Philippines (PHI)	2022-2023	0	1	1	2
14	Kurtis Marschall	Australia (AUS)	2023–2025	0	0	2	2

==== Medals by country ====
Rank	Nation	Gold	Silver	Bronze	Total
1	United States (USA)	3	2	3	8
2	Soviet Union (URS)	3	1	2	6
3	Sweden (SWE)	3	1	1	5
4	Ukraine (UKR)	3	0	0	3
5	Australia (AUS)	2	1	2	5
6	Russia (RUS)	1	2	3	6
7	Poland (POL)	1	1	3	5
8	Germany (GER)	1	1	2	4
9	Canada (CAN)	1	0	0	1
9	Italy (ITA)	1	0	0	1
9	Netherlands (NED)	1	0	0	1
12	France (FRA)	0	4	5	9
13	Cuba (CUB)	0	1	1	2
13	Hungary (HUN)	0	1	1	2
13	Israel (ISR)	0	1	1	2
13	Philippines (PHL)	0	1	1	2
17	Greece (GRE)	0	1	0	1
17	Kazakhstan (KAZ)	0	1	0	1
17	South Africa (RSA)	0	1	0	1
20	Bulgaria (BUL)	0	0	1	1

=== Women ===
Championships	Gold	Silver	Bronze
1999 Seville	Stacy Dragila (USA)	Anzhela Balakhonova (UKR)	Tatiana Grigorieva (AUS)
2001 Edmonton	Stacy Dragila (USA)	Svetlana Feofanova (RUS)	Monika Pyrek (POL)
2003 Saint-Denis	Svetlana Feofanova (RUS)	Annika Becker (GER)	Yelena Isinbayeva (RUS)
2005 Helsinki	Yelena Isinbayeva (RUS)	Monika Pyrek (POL)	Pavla Hamáčková (CZE)
2007 Osaka	Yelena Isinbayeva (RUS)	Kateřina Baďurová (CZE)	Svetlana Feofanova (RUS)
2009 Berlin	Anna Rogowska (POL)	Chelsea Johnson (USA) Monika Pyrek (POL)	none awarded
2011 Daegu	Fabiana Murer (BRA)	Martina Strutz (GER)	Svetlana Feofanova (RUS)
2013 Moscow	Yelena Isinbayeva (RUS)	Jenn Suhr (USA)	Yarisley Silva (CUB)
2015 Beijing	Yarisley Silva (CUB)	Fabiana Murer (BRA)	Nikoleta Kyriakopoulou (GRE)
2017 London	Ekaterini Stefanidi (GRE)	Sandi Morris (USA)	Robeilys Peinado (VEN) Yarisley Silva (CUB)
2019 Doha	Anzhelika Sidorova (ANA)	Sandi Morris (USA)	Katerina Stefanidi (GRE)
2022 Eugene	Katie Nageotte (USA)	Sandi Morris (USA)	Nina Kennedy (AUS)
2023 Budapest	Katie Moon (USA) Nina Kennedy (AUS)	none awarded	Wilma Murto (FIN)
2025 Tokyo	Katie Moon (USA)	Sandi Morris (USA)	Tina Šutej (SLO)

==== Multiple medalists ====
Rank	Athlete	Nation	Period	Gold	Silver	Bronze	Total
1	Yelena Isinbayeva	Russia (RUS)	2003–2013	3	0	1	4
2	Katie Moon	United States (USA)	2022-2025	3	0	0	3
3	Stacy Dragila	United States (USA)	1999–2001	2	0	0	2
4	Svetlana Feofanova	Russia (RUS)	2001–2011	1	1	2	4
5	Fabiana Murer	Brazil (BRA)	2011–2015	1	1	0	2
6	Yarisley Silva	Cuba (CUB)	2013–2015	1	0	2	3
7	Ekaterini Stefanidi	Greece (GRE)	2017–2019	1	0	1	2
7	Nina Kennedy	Australia (AUS)	2022-2023	1	0	1	2
9	Sandi Morris	United States (USA)	2017–2025	0	4	0	3
10	Monika Pyrek	Poland (POL)	2001–2009	0	2	1	3

==== Medals by country ====
Rank	Nation	Gold	Silver	Bronze	Total
1	United States (USA)	5	6	0	11
2	Russia (RUS)	4	1	3	8
3	Poland (POL)	1	2	1	4
4	Brazil (BRA)	1	1	0	2
5	Australia (AUS)	1	0	1	1
6	Cuba (CUB)	1	0	2	3
6	Greece (GRE)	1	0	2	3
8	Authorised Neutral Athletes (ANA)	1	0	0	1
9	Germany (GER)	0	2	0	2
10	Czech Republic (CZE)	0	1	1	2
11	Ukraine (UKR)	0	1	0	1
12	Finland (FIN)	0	0	1	1
12	Slovenia (SLO)	0	0	1	1
12	Venezuela (VEN)	0	0	1	1

== Championship record progression ==
=== Men ===
Men's pole vault World Championships record progression
Mark	Athlete	Nation	Year	Round	Date
5.40 m	Sergey Bubka	Soviet Union (URS)	1983	Final	1983-08-14
5.40 m	Konstantin Volkov	Soviet Union (URS)	1983	Final	1983-08-14
5.40 m	Władysław Kozakiewicz	Poland (POL)	1983	Final	1983-08-14
5.40 m	Thierry Vigneron	France (FRA)	1983	Final	1983-08-14
5.40 m	Frantisek Jansa	Czechoslovakia (TCH)	1983	Final	1983-08-14
5.40 m	Miro Zalar	Sweden (SWE)	1983	Final	1983-08-14
5.40 m	Tom Hintnaus	Brazil (BRA)	1983	Final	1983-08-14
5.40 m	Felix Bohni	Switzerland (SUI)	1983	Final	1983-08-14
5.40 m	Vladimir Polyakov	Soviet Union (URS)	1983	Final	1983-08-14
5.40 m	Tadeusz Slusarski	Poland (POL)	1983	Final	1983-08-14
5.40 m	Jeff Buckingham	United States (USA)	1983	Final	1983-08-14
5.40 m	Veijo Vannesluoma	Finland (FIN)	1983	Final	1983-08-14
5.50 m	Sergey Bubka	Soviet Union (URS)	1983	Final	1983-08-14
5.50 m	Tom Hintnaus	Brazil (BRA)	1983	Final	1983-08-14
5.50 m	Atanas Tarev	Bulgaria (BUL)	1983	Final	1983-08-14
5.50 m	Patrick Abada	France (FRA)	1983	Final	1983-08-14
5.50 m	Miro Zalar	Sweden (SWE)	1983	Final	1983-08-14
5.55 m	Tadeusz Slusarski	Poland (POL)	1983	Final	1983-08-14
5.60 m	Konstantin Volkov	Soviet Union (URS)	1983	Final	1983-08-14
5.60 m	Atanas Tarev	Bulgaria (BUL)	1983	Final	1983-08-14
5.60 m	Sergey Bubka	Soviet Union (URS)	1983	Final	1983-08-14
5.70 m	Sergey Bubka	Soviet Union (URS)	1983	Final	1983-08-14
5.70 m	Nikolay Nikolov	Bulgaria (BUL)	1987	Final	1987-09-05
5.70 m	Thierry Vigneron	France (FRA)	1987	Final	1987-09-05
5.70 m	Sergey Bubka	Soviet Union (URS)	1987	Final	1987-09-05
5.70 m	Rodion Gataulin	Soviet Union (URS)	1987	Final	1987-09-05
5.70 m	Marian Kolasa	Poland (POL)	1987	Final	1987-09-05
5.80 m	Rodion Gataulin	Soviet Union (URS)	1987	Final	1987-09-05
5.80 m	Thierry Vigneron	France (FRA)	1987	Final	1987-09-05
5.80 m	Marian Kolasa	Poland (POL)	1987	Final	1987-09-05
5.85 m	Sergey Bubka	Soviet Union (URS)	1987	Final	1987-09-05
5.90 m	Istvan Bagyula	Hungary (HUN)	1991	Final	1991-08-29
5.95 m	Sergey Bubka	Soviet Union (URS)	1991	Final	1991-08-29
6.00 m	Sergey Bubka	Ukraine (UKR)	1993	Final	1993-08-19
6.01 m	Sergey Bubka	Ukraine (UKR)	1997	Final	1997-08-10
6.02 m	Maksim Tarasov	Russia (RUS)	1999	Final	1999-08-26
6.05 m	Dmitriy Markov	Australia (AUS)	2001	Final	2001-08-09
6.06 m	Armand Duplantis	Sweden (SWE)	2022	Final	2022-07-24
6.21 m WR	Armand Duplantis	Sweden (SWE)	2022	Final	2022-07-24
6.30 m WR	Armand Duplantis	Sweden (SWE)	2025	Final	2025-09-15

=== Women ===
Women's pole vault World Championships record progression
Time	Athlete	Nation	Year	Round	Date
4.40 m	Nicole Humbert	Germany (GER)	1999	Final	1999-08-21
4.40 m	Zsuzsanna Szabo	Hungary (HUN)	1999	Final	1999-08-21
4.40 m	Stacy Dragila	United States (USA)	1999	Final	1999-08-21
4.40 m	Pavla Hamackova	Czech Republic (CZE)	1999	Final	1999-08-21
4.40 m	Daniela Bartova	Czech Republic (CZE)	1999	Final	1999-08-21
4.45 m	Tatiana Grigorieva	Russia (RUS)	1999	Final	1999-08-21
4.45 m	Anzhela Balakhonova	Ukraine (UKR)	1999	Final	1999-08-21
4.45 m	Stacy Dragila	United States (USA)	1999	Final	1999-08-21
4.50 m	Anzhela Balakhonova	Ukraine (UKR)	1999	Final	1999-08-21
4.50 m	Stacy Dragila	United States (USA)	1999	Final	1999-08-21
4.55 m	Anzhela Balakhonova	Ukraine (UKR)	1999	Final	1999-08-21
4.55 m	Stacy Dragila	United States (USA)	1999	Final	1999-08-21
4.60 m WR	Stacy Dragila	United States (USA)	1999	Final	1999-08-21
4.60 m	Stacy Dragila	United States (USA)	2001	Final	2001-08-06
4.60 m	Svetlana Feofanova	Russia (RUS)	2001	Final	2001-08-06
4.65 m	Stacy Dragila	United States (USA)	2001	Final	2001-08-06
4.65 m	Svetlana Feofanova	Russia (RUS)	2001	Final	2001-08-06
4.70 m	Stacy Dragila	United States (USA)	2001	Final	2001-08-06
4.70 m	Svetlana Feofanova	Russia (RUS)	2001	Final	2001-08-06
4.75 m	Svetlana Feofanova	Russia (RUS)	2001	Final	2003-08-25
4.75 m	Stacy Dragila	United States (USA)	2001	Final	2001-08-06
4.75 m	Svetlana Feofanova	Russia (RUS)	2001	Final	2003-08-25
5.01 m WR	Yelena Isinbayeva	Russia (RUS)	2005	Final	2005-08-12

== Best performances ==
=== Top ten highest World Championship vaults^{1} ===
Highest men's vaults at the World Championships
Rank	Height(m)	Athlete	Nation	Year	Date
1	6.30 m	Armand Duplantis	Sweden	2025	2025-09-15
2	6.21 m	Armand Duplantis	Sweden	2022	2022-07-24
3	6.10 m	Armand Duplantis	Sweden	2023	2023-08-26
4	6.05 m	Dmitri Markov	Australia	2001	2001-08-09
5	6.02 m	Maksim Tarasov	Russia	1999	1999-08-26
6	6.01 m	Sergey Bubka	Ukraine	1997	1997-08-10
7	6.00 m	Sergey Bubka	Ukraine	1993	1993-08-19
7	6.00 m	EJ Obiena	Philippines	2023	2023-08-26
7	6.00 m	Emmanouil Karalis	Greece	2025	2025-09-15
10	5.97 m	Sam Kendricks	United States	2019	2019-10-01
10	5.97 m	Armand Duplantis	Sweden	2019	2019-10-01

Highest women's vaults at the World Championships
Rank	Height (m)	Athlete	Nation	Year	Date
1	5.01 m	Yelena Isinbayeva	Russia	2005	2005-08-12
2	4.95 m	Anzhelika Sidorova	Authorised Neutral Athletes	2019	2019-09-29
3	4.91 m	Katerina Stefanidi	Greece	2017	2017-08-06
4	4.90 m	Yarisley Silva	Cuba	2015	2015-08-26
4	4.90 m	Sandi Morris	United States	2019	2019-09-29
4	4.90 m	Nina Kennedy	Australia	2023	2023-08-23
4	4.90 m	Katie Moon	United States	2023	2023-08-23
4	4.90 m	Katie Moon	United States	2025	2025-09-17
9	4.89 m	Yelena Isinbayeva	Russia	2013	2013-08-13
10	4.85 m	Fabiana Murer	Brazil	2011	2011-08-30
10	4.85 m	Fabiana Murer	Brazil	2015	2015-08-26
10	4.85 m	Katerina Stefanidi	Greece	2019	2019-09-29
10	4.85 m	Katie Moon	United States	2022	2022-07-17
10	4.85 m	Sandi Morris	United States	2022	2022-07-17
10	4.85 m	Sandi Morris	United States	2025	2025-09-17

^{1}Does not include ancillary marks

== See also ==
- Pole vault
- Pole vault at the Olympics

== Bibliography ==
- Butler, Mark (2023). World Athletics Championships Budapest 2023 Statistics Book. World Athletics.
