= 1987 World Championships in Athletics – Men's pole vault =

These are the official results of the Men's Pole Vault event at the 1987 IAAF World Championships in Rome, Italy. There were a total of 24 participating athletes, with two qualifying groups and the final held on Saturday September 5, 1987.

== Medalists ==
Gold	Sergey Bubka; Soviet Union (URS)
Silver	Thierry Vigneron; France (FRA)
Bronze	Radion Gataullin; Soviet Union (URS)

== Schedule ==
- All times are Central European Time (UTC+1)

Qualification Round
Group A	Group B
03.09.1987 – ??:??h	03.09.1987 – ??:??h
Final Round
05.09.1987 – 15:30h

== Abbreviations ==
- All results shown are in metres

Q	automatic qualification
q	qualification by rank
DNS	did not start
NM	no mark
WR	world record
AR	area record
NR	national record
PB	personal best
SB	season best

== Records ==
Standing records prior to the 1987 World Athletics Championships
World Record	Sergey Bubka (URS)	6.03 m	June 23, 1987	Prague, Czechoslovakia
Event Record	Sergey Bubka (URS)	5.70 m	August 14, 1983	Helsinki, Finland
Broken records during the 1987 World Athletics Championships
Event Record	Sergey Bubka (URS)	5.85 m	September 5, 1987	Rome, Italy

== Results ==
=== Qualifying round ===
- Held on Thursday 1987-09-03

RANK	GROUP A	HEIGHT
1.	Marian Kolasa (POL)	5.55 m
1.	Sergey Bubka (URS)	5.55 m
3.	Atanas Tarev (BUL)	5.50 m
4.	Hermann Fehringer (AUT)	5.40 m
4.	Zdenek Lubenský (TCH)	5.40 m
4.	Radion Gataullin (URS)	5.40 m
7.	Bernhard Zintl (FRG)	5.30 m
8.	Timo Kuusisto (FIN)	5.20 m
9.	Liang Xueren (CHN)	5.10 m
10.	István Bagyula (HUN)	5.00 m
—	Billy Olson (USA)	NM
—	Philippe Collet (FRA)	NM

RANK	GROUP B	HEIGHT
1.	Earl Bell (USA)	5.55 m
1.	Ferenc Salbert (FRA)	5.55 m
1.	Aleksandrs Obizajevs (URS)	5.55 m
4.	Nikolay Nikolov (BUL)	5.50 m
4.	Delko Lesev (BUL)	5.50 m
4.	Thierry Vigneron (FRA)	5.50 m
7.	Gianni Stecchi (ITA)	5.40 m
7.	Miro Zalar (SWE)	5.40 m
9.	Mirosław Chmara (POL)	5.20 m
—	Joe Dial (USA)	NM
—	Bob Ferguson (CAN)	NM
—	Kimmo Kuusela (FIN)	NM

=== Final ===
Rank	Name	Nationality	5.30	5.40	5.50	5.60	5.70	5.75	5.80	5.85	6.05	Result	Notes
1st place, gold medalist(s)	Sergey Bubka	Soviet Union	–	–	–	–	o	–	–	o	xx	5.85	CR
2nd place, silver medalist(s)	Thierry Vigneron	France	–	–	o	–	o	–	xo	xxx		5.80	
3rd place, bronze medalist(s)	Radion Gataullin	Soviet Union	–	–	–	o	xo		xo	xxx		5.80	
4	Marian Kolasa	Poland	–	–	o	xo	xxo	–	xxo	xxx		5.80	
5	Earl Bell	United States	–	o	–	o	o	xxx				5.70	
5	Nikolay Nikolov	Bulgaria	–	o	–	o	o	xx–	x			5.70	=PB
7	Delko Lesev	Bulgaria	–	o	–	o	xxx					5.60	
8	Atanas Tarev	Bulgaria	–	o	–	xo	x–	xx				5.60	
9	Aleksandrs Obižajevs	Soviet Union	–	–	o	–	xxx					5.50	
10	Ferenc Salbert	France	–	–	xo	–	–	xxx				5.50	
11	Gianni Stecchi	Italy	o	xo	xx–	x						5.40	
12	Miro Zalar	Sweden	xo	–	xxx							5.30	
	Hermann Fehringer	Austria	–	xxx								NM	
	Zdeněk Lubenský	Czechoslovakia	xxx									NM	

== See also ==
- 1983 Men's World Championships Pole Vault (Helsinki)
- 1984 Men's Olympic Pole Vault (Los Angeles)
- 1986 Men's European Championships Pole Vault (Stuttgart)
- 1988 Men's Olympic Pole Vault (Seoul)
- 1990 Men's European Championships Pole Vault (Split)
- 1991 Men's World Championships Pole Vault (Tokyo)
- 1992 Men's Olympic Pole Vault (Barcelona)
