= 1987 European Athletics Indoor Championships – Men's pole vault =

The men's pole vault event at the 1987 European Athletics Indoor Championships was held on 22 February.

== Results ==
Rank	Name	Nationality	5.00	5.15	5.30	5.40	5.50	5.55	5.60	5.65	5.70	5.75	5.80	5.85	5.90	5.97	Result	Notes
1st place, gold medalist(s)	Thierry Vigneron	France	–	–	–	–	o	–	–	o	–	o	–	o	xx–	x	5.85	=CR, =NR
2nd place, silver medalist(s)	Ferenc Salbert	France	–	–	–	–	o	–	–	–	–	xxo	–	xo	xxx		5.85	=NR
3rd place, bronze medalist(s)	Marian Kolasa	Poland	–	–	–	–	o	–	–	o	o	xo	o	xxx			5.80	
4	Philippe Collet	France	–	–	–	–	o	–	–	o	–	xxo	xxx				5.75	
5	Rodion Gataullin	Soviet Union	–	–	–	–	–	–	xo	–	–	–	x–	xx			5.60	
6	Nikolay Nikolov	Bulgaria	–	–	xxo	–	o	–	xo	–	xxx						5.60	
7	Atanas Tarev	Bulgaria	–	–	–	o	–	–	xxo	–	xxx						5.60	
8	Asko Peltoniemi	Finland	–	–	o	–	xo	–	xxx								5.50	
9	Stanimir Penchev	Bulgaria	–	–	–	o	–	xxx									5.40	
10	Hermann Fehringer	Austria	–	–	o	xxo	xxx										5.40	
11	Gianni Stecchi	Italy	o	o	xxo	xxo	xxx										5.40	
12	Miro Zalar	Sweden	–	–	o	–	r										5.30	
13	Arto Peltoniemi	Finland	–	xo	o	xr											5.30	
14	Kimmo Pallonen	Finland	–	–	xo	xxx											5.30	
14	Bernhard Zintl	West Germany	–	–	xo	–	xxx										5.30	
16	Javier García	Spain	–	xxo	xxo	xxx											5.30	
