= Athletics at the 1987 Summer Universiade – Men's pole vault =

The men's pole vault event at the 1987 Summer Universiade was held at the Stadion Maksimir in Zagreb on 15 July 1987.

== Results ==
Rank	Athlete	Nationality	Result	Notes
1st place, gold medalist(s)	Viktor Spasov	Soviet Union	5.65	
2nd place, silver medalist(s)	Radion Gataullin	Soviet Union	5.60	
3rd place, bronze medalist(s)	Scott Davis	United States	5.60	
4	Nikolay Nikolov	Bulgaria	5.60	
5	Lane Lohr	United States	5.30	
6	Kimmo Kuusela	Finland	5.30	
7	Giancarlo Grassi	Italy	5.30	
8	Zdeněk Lubenský	Czechoslovakia	5.30	
9	Simon Arkell	Australia	5.10	
9	Philippe d'Encausse	France	5.10	
	Gürbüz Yavan	Turkey	NM	
	Marco Andreini	Italy	NM	
	Stanimir Penchev	Bulgaria	NM	
	Antonio Montepeque	Guatemala	NM	
	Toshiyuki Hashioka	Japan	NM	
	Gerhard Schmidt	West Germany	DNS	
	Kai Atzbacher	West Germany	DNS	
