= 1986 European Athletics Championships – Men's pole vault =

Men's pole vault at the European Athletics Championships

These are the official results of the Men's pole vault event at the 1986 European Championships in Stuttgart, West Germany, held at Neckarstadion on 27 and 29 August 1986.

== Medalists ==
Gold	Sergey Bubka; Soviet Union
Silver	Vasiliy Bubka; Soviet Union
Bronze	Philippe Collet; France

== Results ==
=== Qualification ===
27 August

Rank	Name	Nationality	Result	Notes
	František Jansa	Czechoslovakia	5.50	Q
	Thierry Vigneron	France	5.50	Q
	Philippe Collet	France	5.50	Q
	Kimmo Kuusela	Finland	5.50	Q
	Atanas Tarev	Bulgaria	5.50	Q
	Stanimir Penchev	Bulgaria	5.50	Q
	Sergey Bubka	Soviet Union	5.50	Q
	Nikolay Nikolov	Bulgaria	5.50	Q
	Vasiliy Bubka	Soviet Union	5.50	Q
	Zdeněk Lubenský	Czechoslovakia	5.50	Q
	Serge Ferreira	France	5.40	q
	Asko Peltoniemi	Finland	5.40	q
	Christiaan Leeuwenburgh	Netherlands	5.40	q
	Jürgen Winkler	West Germany	5.30	
	Hermann Fehringer	Austria	5.30	
	Bernhard Zintl	West Germany	5.20	
	Andy Ashurst	Great Britain	NM	
	Radion Gataullin	Soviet Union	NM	
	Alberto Ruiz	Spain	NM	
	Javier García	Spain	NM	

=== Final ===
29 August

Rank	Name	Nationality	5.25	5.35	5.45	5.55	5.65	5.70	5.75	5.80	5.85	6.05	Result	Notes
1st place, gold medalist(s)	Sergey Bubka	Soviet Union	–	–	–	–	–	xxo	–	–	o	xxx	5.85	CR
2nd place, silver medalist(s)	Vasiliy Bubka	Soviet Union											5.75	
3rd place, bronze medalist(s)	Philippe Collet	France	–	–	–	–	o	–	xxo	–	xxx		5.75	
4	Atanas Tarev	Bulgaria	–	o	–	xo	–	xxo					5.70	
6	Kimmo Kuusela	Finland											5.55	
6	Zdeněk Lubenský	Czechoslovakia	–	o	–	o	x						5.55	
7	Stanimir Penchev	Bulgaria	–	xxo	–	o	xx–	x					5.55	
8	Serge Ferreira	France											5.35	
9	František Jansa	Czechoslovakia				xxx							5.35	
9	Nikolay Nikolov	Bulgaria	–	xo	–	xxx							5.35	
11	Christiaan Leeuwenburgh	Netherlands											5.25	
12	Asko Peltoniemi	Finland											5.25	
	Thierry Vigneron	France	–	–	–	–	xx–	x					NM	

== Participation ==
According to an unofficial count, 20 athletes from 10 countries participated in the event.

- Austria (1)
- Bulgaria (3)
- Czechoslovakia (2)
- Finland (2)
- France (3)
- Netherlands (1)
- Soviet Union (3)
- Spain (2)
- United Kingdom (1)
- West Germany (2)

== See also ==
- 1982 Men's European Championships Pole Vault (Athens)
- 1983 Men's World Championships Pole Vault (Helsinki)
- 1984 Men's Olympic Pole Vault (Los Angeles)
- 1987 Men's World Championships Pole Vault (Rome)
- 1988 Men's Olympic Pole Vault (Seoul)
- 1990 Men's European Championships Pole Vault (Split)
