= 1982 European Athletics Championships – Men's pole vault =

Men's pole vault at the European Athletics Championships

These are the official results of the Men's Pole Vault event at the 1982 European Championships in Athens, Greece, held at Olympic Stadium "Spiros Louis" on 7 and 9 September 1982.

== Medalists ==
Gold	Aleksandr Krupskiy; Soviet Union
Silver	Vladimir Polyakov; Soviet Union
Bronze	Atanas Tarev; Bulgaria

== Results ==
=== Final ===
9 September

Rank	Name	Nationality	Result	Notes
1st place, gold medalist(s)	Aleksandr Krupskiy	Soviet Union	5.60	CR
2nd place, silver medalist(s)	Vladimir Polyakov	Soviet Union	5.60	CR
3rd place, bronze medalist(s)	Atanas Tarev	Bulgaria	5.60	CR
4	Miro Zalar	Sweden	5.55	
5	Aleksandr Chernyayev	Soviet Union	5.50	
5	Thierry Vigneron	France	5.50	
7	Günther Lohre	West Germany	5.50	
7	František Jansa	Czechoslovakia	5.50	
9	Felix Böhni	Switzerland	5.45	
10	Zbigniew Radzikowski	Poland	5.45	
11	Jürgen Winkler	West Germany	5.35	
12	Pierre Quinon	France	5.35	
12	Tadeusz Ślusarski	Poland	5.35	
	Timo Kuusisto	Finland	NH	

=== Qualification ===
7 September

Rank	Name	Nationality	Result	Notes
	Felix Böhni	Switzerland	5.45	Q
	Aleksandr Chernyayev	Soviet Union	5.45	Q
	Atanas Tarev	Bulgaria	5.45	Q
	Tadeusz Ślusarski	Poland	5.45	Q
	Günther Lohre	West Germany	5.45	Q
	Pierre Quinon	France	5.45	Q
	Vladimir Polyakov	Soviet Union	5.45	Q
	Miro Zalar	Sweden	5.40	q
	Zbigniew Radzikowski	Poland	5.35	q
	Thierry Vigneron	France	5.35	q
	Aleksandr Krupskiy	Soviet Union	5.35	q
	Jürgen Winkler	West Germany	5.35	q
	František Jansa	Czechoslovakia	5.35	q
	Timo Kuusisto	Finland	5.35	q
	Stanimir Penchev	Bulgaria	5.25	
	Ferenc Salbert	France	5.25	
	Daniel Aebischer	Switzerland	5.25	
	Mauro Barella	Italy	NH	
	Ivo Yanchev	Bulgaria	NH	
	Jean-Michel Bellot	France	NH	
	Antti Kalliomäki	Finland	NH	
	Rauli Pudas	Finland	NH	
	Kjell Isaksson	Sweden	NH	
	Andreas Tsonis	Greece	NH	

== Participation ==
According to an unofficial count, 24 athletes from 11 countries participated in the event.

- Bulgaria (3)
- Czechoslovakia (1)
- Finland (3)
- France (4)
- Greece (1)
- Italy (1)
- Poland (2)
- Soviet Union (3)
- Sweden (2)
- Switzerland (2)
- West Germany (2)

== See also ==
- 1978 Men's European Championships Pole Vault (Prague)
- 1980 Men's Olympic Pole Vault (Moscow)
- 1983 Men's World Championships Pole Vault (Helsinki)
- 1984 Men's Olympic Pole Vault (Los Angeles)
- 1986 Men's European Championships Pole Vault (Stuttgart)
- 1987 Men's World Championships Pole Vault (Rome)
- 1988 Men's Olympic Pole Vault (Seoul)
- 1990 Men's European Championships Pole Vault (Split)
