= Athletics at the 1992 Summer Olympics – Men's pole vault =

Men's pole vault at the Games of the XXV Olympiad
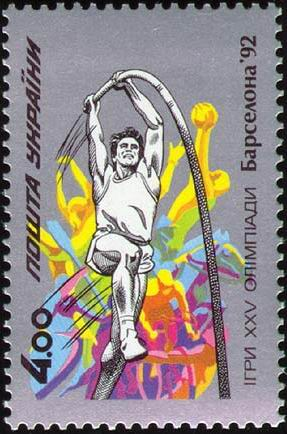
- Ukraine stamp depicting the event
- Venue: Estadi Olímpic Lluís Companys
- Dates: 5 August 1992 (qualifying); 7 August 1992 (final)
- Competitors: 34 from 25 nations
- Winning height: 5.80

Medalists
1st place, gold medalist(s)		Maksim Tarasov; Unified Team
2nd place, silver medalist(s)		Igor Trandenkov; Unified Team
3rd place, bronze medalist(s)		Javier García; Spain

The men's pole vault was an event at the 1992 Summer Olympics in Barcelona, Spain. There were a total number of 34 participating athletes from 23 nations. The maximum number of athletes per nation had been set at 3 since the 1930 Olympic Congress. The qualification mark was set at 5.60 metres (six + six athletes).

This was a mostly clean competition, with only three athletes having a miss at a height that was not their best or better in the competition. The main exception was the favourite Sergey Bubka, who failed to clear the bar in the final. Maksim Tarasov took gold with only three attempts, clean through 5.80. Igor Trandenkov equalled Tarasov, but took three attempts to clear 5.80. Javier García took bronze in his home town by clearing 5.75 on his second attempt, to edge Kory Tarpenning who cleared it on his third. It was the second consecutive Games that Soviet or former Soviet vaulters won the event; Spain earned its first men's pole vault medal with García's bronze.

== Background ==
This was the 22nd appearance of the event, which is one of 12 athletics events to have been held at every Summer Olympics. The returning finalists from the 1988 Games were gold medalist Sergey Bubka of the Soviet Union (now the Unified Team), fifth-place finisher Philippe Collet of France, seventh-place finisher István Bagyula of Hungary, eighth-place finisher Philippe d'Encausse of France, ninth-place finisher Asko Peltoniemi of Finland, tenth-place finisher Kory Tarpenning of the United States, and thirteenth-place finisher Hermann Fehringer of Austria. Bubka was an "overwhelming favorite" to repeat; in addition to the 1988 Olympic gold, he had won all three world championships held to date (1983, 1987, and 1991), set 14 world records, and been the only man to clear 20 feet.

Cyprus, Israel, Latvia, Mauritius, New Zealand, the Philippines, and Portugal each made their men's pole vaulting debut; twelve of the fifteen former Soviet republics competed together as the Unified Team. The United States made its 21st appearance, most of any nation, having missed only the boycotted 1980 Games.

== Competition format ==
The competition used the two-round format introduced in 1912, with results cleared between rounds. Vaulters received three attempts at each height. Ties were broken by the countback rule.

In the qualifying round, the bar was set at 4.80 metres, 5.00 metres, 5.20 metres, 5.30 metres, 5.40 metres, 5.50 metres, 5.55 metres, and 5.60 metres. All vaulters clearing 5.60 metres advanced to the final. If fewer than 12 cleared that height, the top 12 (including ties) advanced.

In the final, the bar was set at 5.20 metres, 5.30 metres, 5.40 metres, 5.50 metres, and then increased by 5 centimetres as a time.

== Records ==
These were the standing world and Olympic records (in metres) prior to the 1992 Summer Olympics.

World record	Sergey Bubka (UKR)	6.11	Dijon, France	13 June 1992
Olympic record	Sergey Bubka (URS)	5.90	Seoul, South Korea	28 September 1988

No new world or Olympic records were set during the competition. The following national records were established during the competition:

Nation	Athlete	Round	Time
Philippines	Edward Lasquete	Qualifying	5.00

== Schedule ==
All times are Central European Summer Time (UTC+2)

Date	Time	Round
Wednesday, 5 August 1992	9:30	Qualifying
Friday, 7 August 1992	17:00	Final

== Results ==
Key

- o = Height cleared
- x = Height failed
- – = Height passed
- r = Retired
- SB = Season's best
- PB = Personal best
- NR = National record
- AR = Area record
- OR = Olympic record
- WR = World record
- WL = World lead
- NM = No mark
- DNS = Did not start
- DQ = Disqualified

=== Qualifying ===
The qualifying round was held on Wednesday August 5, 1992. Qualification rule: Qualifying performance 5.60 (Q) or at least 12 best performers (q) advance to the final.

Rank	Group	Athlete	Nation	4.80	5.00	5.20	5.30	5.40	5.50	5.55	5.60	Height	Notes
1	A	Sergey Bubka	Unified Team	–	–	–	–	–	–	–	o	5.60	Q
1	B	Maksim Tarasov	Unified Team	–	–	–	–	–	o	–	o	5.60	Q
3	B	Yevgeny Krasnov	Israel	–	–	–	–	xo	o	xo	o	5.60	Q
4	B	Tim Bright	United States	–	–	–	–	o	o	–	xo	5.60	Q
5	A	Kory Tarpenning	United States	–	–	–	–	xo	xo	–	xo	5.60	Q
6	B	Igor Trandenkov	Unified Team	–	–	–	–	–	–	xo	xxo	5.60	Q
7	A	Alberto Ruiz	Spain	–	–	o	–	o	xo	xo	xxx	5.55	q
7	B	Javier García	Spain	–	–	–	–	o	xo	xo	x–	5.55	q
9	B	Asko Peltoniemi	Finland	–	–	–	–	xo	xo	xo	x–	5.55	q
9	B	István Bagyula	Hungary	–	–	o	o	xo	xo	xo	xxx	5.55	q
11	A	David Volz	United States	–	–	–	–	o	xo	xxo	xxx	5.55	q
11	B	Philippe Collet	France	–	–	–	–	–	xo	xxo	x–	5.55	q
13	A	Jean Galfione	France	–	–	–	–	o	o	–	xxx	5.50	
14	A	Philippe d'Encausse	France	–	–	–	–	xo	o	–	xxx	5.50	
14	A	Jani Lehtonen	Finland	–	–	–	–	xo	o	–	xxx	5.50	
16	A	Galin Nikov	Bulgaria	–	–	–	o	–	xo	–	xxx	5.50	
17	A	Valeri Bukrejev	Estonia	–	–	–	–	o	xxo	xxx	—N/a	5.50	
18	B	Edgar Díaz	Puerto Rico	–	–	xxo	–	xo	xxo	xxx	—N/a	5.50	
19	A	Daniel Martí	Spain	–	–	o	–	xo	xxx	—N/a		5.40	
20	B	Andrea Pegoraro	Italy	–	–	–	–	xxo	xxx	—N/a		5.40	
21	A	Peter Widén	Sweden	–	–	–	xxo	xxo	xxx	—N/a		5.40	
22	B	Simon Arkell	Australia	–	–	–	o	–	xxx	—N/a		5.30	
23	B	Christos Pallakis	Greece	–	xo	o	xxo	xxx	—N/a			5.30	
24	A	Doug Wood	Canada	–	–	o	–	xxx	—N/a			5.20	
24	A	Jean-Kersley Gardenne	Mauritius	–	o	o	xxx	—N/a				5.20	
26	A	Mike Edwards	Great Britain	–	–	xo	xxx	—N/a				5.20	
26	B	Photis Stephani	Cyprus	–	o	xo	xxx	—N/a				5.20	
28	B	Edward Lasquete	Philippines	xxo	o	xxx	—N/a					5.00	NR
29	B	Nuno Fernandes	Portugal	xxo	xo	xxx	—N/a					5.00	
—	A	Kim Chul-kyun	South Korea	–	–	xxx	—N/a					No mark	
—	A	Paul Gibbons	New Zealand	–	x–	—N/a						No mark	
—	B	Aleksandrs Obižajevs	Latvia	–	–	–	–	–	xxx	—N/a		No mark	
—	B	Hiroyuki Sano	Japan	–	–	xxx		—N/a				No mark	
—	B	Tómas Riether	Chile	–	xxx	—N/a						No mark	
—	A	Hermann Fehringer	Austria	DNS									

=== Final ===
The final was held on Friday August 7, 1992.

Rank	Athlete	Nation	5.20	5.30	5.40	5.50	5.55	5.60	5.65	5.70	5.75	5.80	5.85	5.90	Height
1st place, gold medalist(s)	Maksim Tarasov	Unified Team	–	–	–	–	–	o	–	–	o	o	–	xxx	5.80
2nd place, silver medalist(s)	Igor Trandenkov	Unified Team	–	–	–	o	–	–	–	o	–	xxo	xxx	—N/a	5.80
3rd place, bronze medalist(s)	Javier García	Spain	–	–	o	–	–	o	–	o	xo	xxx	—N/a		5.75
4	Kory Tarpenning	United States	–	–	–	–	–	o	–	–	xxo	xxx	—N/a		5.75
5	David Volz	United States	–	–	–	o	–	–	o	–	xxx	—N/a			5.65
6	Asko Peltoniemi	Finland	–	–	xxo	–	–	xo	–	x–	xx	—N/a			5.60
7	Philippe Collet	France	–	–	–	–	o	–	–	xxx	—N/a				5.55
8	Danny Krasnov	Israel	–	–	xo	xxx	—N/a								5.40
9	István Bagyula	Hungary	xxo	o	xxx	—N/a									5.30
10	Alberto Ruiz	Spain	–	xxo	–	xxx	—N/a								5.30
—	Sergey Bubka	Unified Team	–	–	–	–	–	–	–	xx–	x	—N/a			No mark
—	Tim Bright	United States	–	–	–	–	–	xxx	—N/a						No mark

== See also ==
- 1988 Men's Olympic Pole Vault (Seoul)
- 1990 Men's European Championships Pole Vault (Split)
- 1991 Men's World Championships Pole Vault (Tokyo)
- 1993 Men's World Championships Pole Vault (Stuttgart)
- 1994 Men's European Championships Pole Vault (Helsinki)
