= 1985 IAAF World Indoor Games – Men's pole vault =

The men's pole vault event at the 1985 IAAF World Indoor Games was held at the Palais Omnisports Paris-Bercy on 19 January.

== Results ==
Rank	Name	Nationality	5.00	5.20	5.30	5.40	5.50	5.60	5.65	5.70	5.75	5.80	5.86	Result	Notes
1st place, gold medalist(s)	Sergey Bubka	Soviet Union	–	–	–	xo	–	xxo	–	x–	o	–	xxx	5.75	
2nd place, silver medalist(s)	Thierry Vigneron	France	–	–	–	–	o	–	–	o	–	xxx		5.70	
3rd place, bronze medalist(s)	Vasiliy Bubka	Soviet Union	–	–	xo	–	xo	o	–	x–	xx			5.60	
4	Patrick Abada	France	–	–	–	–	xo	–	xxx					5.50	
4	Marian Kolasa	Poland	–	–	–	o	xo	x						5.50	
6	Alberto Ruiz	Spain	o	o	–	xo	xo	xxx						5.50	
7	Mariusz Klimczyk	Poland	–	xxo	–	xo	xxo	xxx						5.50	
8	Kimmo Pallonen	Finland	–	–	–	xo	xxx							5.40	
8	Joe Dial	United States	–	–	–	xo	xxx							5.40	
10	František Jansa	Czechoslovakia	–	o	–	xxx								5.20	
11	Timo Kuusisto	Finland	–	xo	–	xxx								5.20	
12	Chen Guomin	China	o	xxo	xxx									5.20	
13	Keith Stock	Great Britain	o	xxx										5.00	
13	Zdeněk Lubenský	Czechoslovakia	o	xxx										5.00	
15	Daniel Aebischer	Switzerland	xo	xxx										5.00	
15	Hermann Fehringer	Austria	xo	xxx										5.00	
	Stanimir Penchev	Bulgaria	–	xxx										NM	
