= 1987 IAAF World Indoor Championships – Men's pole vault =

The men's pole vault event at the 1987 IAAF World Indoor Championships was held at the Hoosier Dome in Indianapolis on 8 March.

== Results ==
Rank	Name	Nationality	5.30	5.40	5.50	5.60	5.65	5.70	5.75	5.80	5.85	Result	Notes
1st place, gold medalist(s)	Sergey Bubka	Soviet Union	–	–	–	–	o	–	–	–	xo	5.85	xxx CR
2nd place, silver medalist(s)	Earl Bell	United States									x	5.80	
3rd place, bronze medalist(s)	Thierry Vigneron	France			xxo			o		xo		5.80	
4	Ferenc Salbert	France										5.80	
5	Marian Kolasa	Poland										5.75	
6	Atanas Tarev	Bulgaria										5.70	=PB
7	Nikolay Nikolov	Bulgaria										5.60	
8	Doug Lytle	United States										5.60	
9	Radion Gataullin	Soviet Union										5.60	
10	Gianni Stecchi	Italy										5.50	NR
11	Javier García	Spain										5.40	
12	Liang Xueren	China										5.40	
13	Hermann Fehringer	Austria										5.30	
13	Asko Peltoniemi	Finland										5.30	
	Antonio Montepeque	Guatemala										NM	
