= 1988 European Athletics Indoor Championships – Men's pole vault =

The men's pole vault event at the 1988 European Athletics Indoor Championships was held on 6 March.

== Results ==
Rank	Name	Nationality	5.10	5.20	5.30	5.40	5.50	5.55	5.60	5.65	5.70	5.75	5.90	Result	Notes
1st place, gold medalist(s)	Rodion Gataullin	Soviet Union	–	–	–	–	–	–	–	o	–	xxo	xxx	5.75	
2nd place, silver medalist(s)	Nikolay Nikolov	Bulgaria	–	–	–	xo	–	–	o	–	o	xxx		5.70	
3rd place, bronze medalist(s)	Atanas Tarev	Bulgaria	–	–	–	o	–	–	o	–	xo	xxx		5.70	
4	Mirosław Chmara	Poland	–	–	–	–	xo	–	o	–	xo	xxx		5.70	
5	Philippe Collet	France	–	–	–	–	–	–	xxo	–	xx–	x		5.60	
6	Jean-Marc Tailhardat	France	–	xo	–	xo	–	o	–	xxx				5.55	
7	Hermann Fehringer	Austria	–	–	o	o	o	–	xxx					5.50	
7	Bernhard Zintl	West Germany	–	o	–	o	o	xxx						5.50	
9	Philippe d'Encausse	France	–	–	xxo	–	o	–	xxx					5.50	
10	Miro Zalar	Sweden	–	–	–	–	xxo	–	xxx					5.50	
11	Marco Andreini	Italy	o	–	o	o	x–	xx						5.40	
12	Harri Palola	Finland	–	–	xo	o	xxx							5.40	
13	Gábor Molnár	Hungary	–	xo	–	xo	xxx							5.40	
14	István Bagyula	Hungary	xxo	–	o	xo	xxx							5.40	
15	Enzo Brichese	Italy	–	o	–	xxo	–	xxx						5.40	
15	Delko Lesev	Bulgaria												5.40	
17	Dirk Ledegen	Belgium	–	xxo	xxo	xxx								5.30	
18	Giorgio Grassi	Italy	–	o	–	xxx								5.20	
	Valeriy Ishutin	Soviet Union	–	–	–	xxx								NM	
	Dezső Szabó	Hungary	xxx											NM	
