= 1991 IAAF World Indoor Championships – Men's pole vault =

The men's pole vault event at the 1991 IAAF World Indoor Championships was held on 9 March.

== Results ==
| Rank | Name | Nationality | 5.20 | 5.30 | 5.40 | 5.50 | 5.60 | 5.70 | 5.80 | 5.86 | 5.92 | 6.00 | 6.10 | Result | Notes |
|---|---|---|---|---|---|---|---|---|---|---|---|---|---|---|---|
| 1st place, gold medalist(s) | Sergey Bubka | Soviet Union | – | – | – | – | – | o | – | o | – | xo | xxx | 6.00 | CR |
| 2nd place, silver medalist(s) | Viktor Ryzhenkov | Soviet Union | – | – | – | – | xo | xo | xo | x– | xx | | | 5.80 | |
| 3rd place, bronze medalist(s) | Ferenc Salbert | France | – | – | o | – | xo | o | xxx | | | | | 5.70 | |
| 4 | Kory Tarpenning | United States | – | – | – | xo | – | xo | xxx | | | | | 5.70 | |
| 5 | Hermann Fehringer | Austria | – | – | xo | – | xo | xo | xxx | | | | | 5.70 | |
| 6 | Peter Widén | Sweden | – | o | o | xxo | o | xxx | | | | | | 5.60 | =NR |
| 7 | Javier García | Spain | – | – | o | xo | xxo | xxx | | | | | | 5.60 | |
| 8 | Bernhard Zintl | Germany | xo | – | o | o | xxx | | | | | | | 5.50 | |
| 9 | Scott Huffman | United States | – | – | xo | xo | xxx | | | | | | | 5.50 | |
| 10 | Mirosław Chmara | Poland | – | o | – | xxo | xxx | | | | | | | 5.50 | |
| 10 | Delko Lesev | Bulgaria | – | o | – | xxo | x– | xx | | | | | | 5.50 | |
| 12 | Jean Galfione | France | o | – | o | – | xxx | | | | | | | 5.40 | |
| 13 | Asko Peltoniemi | Finland | – | – | xo | – | xxx | | | | | | | 5.40 | |
| | Kim Chul-kyun | South Korea | xxx | | | | | | | | | | | NM | |
