= 1983 European Athletics Indoor Championships – Men's pole vault =

The men's pole vault event at the 1983 European Athletics Indoor Championships was held on 6 March.

== Results ==
Rank	Name	Nationality	Result	Notes
1st place, gold medalist(s)	Vladimir Polyakov	Soviet Union	5.60	
2nd place, silver medalist(s)	Aleksandr Obizhajevs	Soviet Union	5.60	
3rd place, bronze medalist(s)	Patrick Abada	France	5.55	
4	Atanas Tarev	Bulgaria	5.55	
5	Tadeusz Ślusarski	Poland	5.50	
6	Miro Zalar	Sweden	5.45	
7	František Jansa	Czechoslovakia	5.40	
8	Peter Volmer	West Germany	5.40	
9	Władysław Kozakiewicz	Poland	5.30	
10	Alberto Ruiz	Spain	5.30	
11	Serge Ferreira	France	5.30	
12	Gerhard Schmidt	West Germany	5.20	
12	Ferenc Salbert	France	5.20	
14	Mauro Barella	Italy	5.20	
15	Ivo Yanchev	Bulgaria	5.20	
16	Ernö Makó	Hungary	5.20	
16	Hermann Fehringer	Austria	5.20	
18	Marian Kolasa	Poland	5.20	
19	Jozsef Novobáczky	Hungary	5.20	
	Thierry Vigneron	France	NM	
	Sergey Kulibaba	Soviet Union	NM	
