= Athletics at the 1989 Summer Universiade – Men's pole vault =

The men's pole vault event at the 1989 Summer Universiade was held at the Wedaustadion in Duisburg on 25 and 26 August 1989.

== Medalists ==
Gold	Silver	Bronze
Bernhard Zintl; West Germany	Dean Starkey; United States	Javier García; Spain

== Results ==
=== Qualification ===
Rank	Group	Athlete	Nationality	Result	Notes
?	?	Ignacio Paradinas	Spain	5.20	
?	?	Javier García	Spain	5.20	
?	?	Doug Wood	Canada	5.20	
?	?	Philippe d'Encausse	France	5.20	
?	?	Kelly Riley	United States	5.20	
?	?	Bernhard Zintl	West Germany	5.20	
?	?	Riccardo Orioli	Italy	5.20	
?	?	Mark Lugenbühl	West Germany	5.20	
?	?	István Bagyula	Hungary	5.20	
?	?	Patrik Johansson	Sweden	5.20	
?	?	Dean Starkey	United States	5.20	
?	?	Kim Chul-kyun	South Korea	5.20	
?	?	Juha Rauhaniemi	Finland	5.20	
?	?	Simon Arkell	Australia	5.20	
?	?	Thierry Moyse	France	5.20	
?	?	Marco Andreini	Italy	5.20	
17	?	Simeon Anastasiadis	Greece	5.00	
18	?	Nuno Fernandes	Portugal	4.60	

=== Final ===
Rank	Athlete	Nationality	5.00	5.20	5.30	5.40	5.50	5.60	5.65	5.70	Result	Notes
1st place, gold medalist(s)	Bernhard Zintl	West Germany							o	xxx	5.65	
2nd place, silver medalist(s)	Dean Starkey	United States									5.60	
3rd place, bronze medalist(s)	Javier García	Spain	–	o	–	xo	xxx				5.40	
4	Simon Arkell	Australia									5.40	
5	Doug Wood	Canada									5.30	
6	István Bagyula	Hungary									5.30	
7	Kelly Riley	United States									5.20	
7	Riccardo Orioli	Italy									5.20	
9	Mark Lugenbühl	West Germany									5.20	
10	Thierry Moyse	France									5.20	
11	Kim Chul-kyun	South Korea									5.20	
12	Ignacio Paradinas	Spain	xxo	xxx							5.00	
	Philippe d'Encausse	France	–	–	–	xxx					NM	
	Patrik Johansson	Sweden	–	xxx							NM	
	Juha Rauhaniemi	Finland	–	xxx							NM	
	Marco Andreini	Italy	–	xxx							NM	
