= Athletics at the 1985 Summer Universiade – Men's pole vault =

The men's pole vault event at the 1985 Summer Universiade was held at the Kobe Universiade Memorial Stadium in Kobe on 2 September 1985.

== Results ==
Rank	Athlete	Nationality	Result	Notes
1st place, gold medalist(s)	Radion Gataullin	Soviet Union	5.75	=UR
2nd place, silver medalist(s)	Philippe Collet	France	5.70	
3rd place, bronze medalist(s)	David Volz	United States	5.60	
4	Peter Volmer	West Germany	5.30	
5	Chiesto Itakura	Japan	5.30	
6	Ji Zebiao	China	5.20	
6	Tim Bright	United States	5.20	
8	Toshiyuki Hashioka	Japan	5.00	
9	Andy Ashurst	Great Britain	5.00	
	Marco Andreini	Italy	NM	
