= 1983 World Championships in Athletics – Men's pole vault =

These are the official results of the Men's Pole Vault event at the 1983 IAAF World Championships in Helsinki, Finland. There were a total number of 27 participating athletes. The qualification round was stopped and later canceled due to heavy rain and strong winds and eventually a straight final was held on 14 August, the last day of the championships.

== Medalists ==
Gold	Sergey Bubka; Soviet Union (URS)
Silver	Konstantin Volkov; Soviet Union (URS)
Bronze	Atanas Tarev; Bulgaria (BUL)

== Records ==
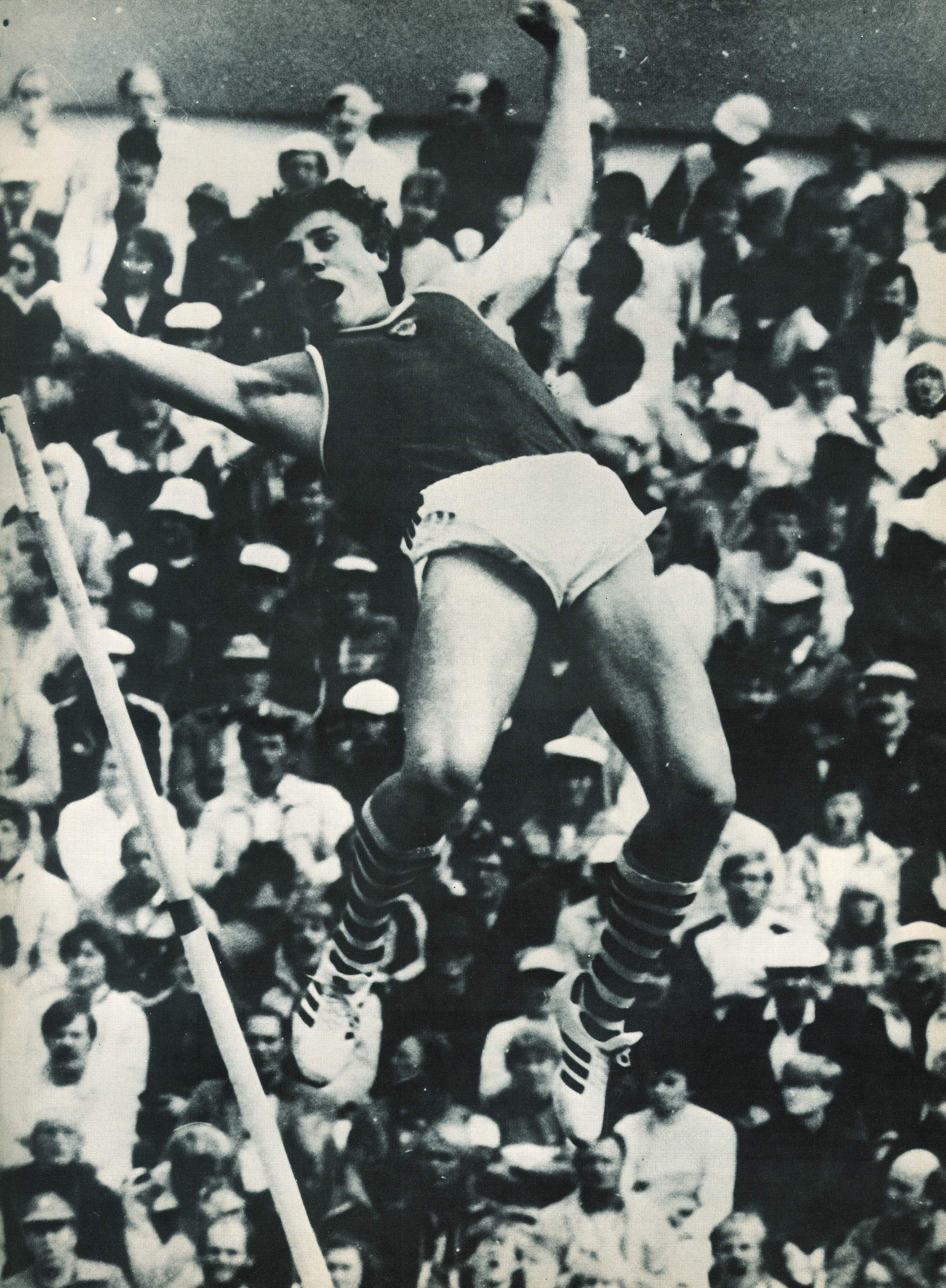
Serguei Bubka in Helsinki, 1983.

Standing records prior to the 1983 World Athletics Championships
World Record	Vladimir Polyakov (URS)	5.81 m	June 26, 1981	(Soviet Union) Tbilisi, Georgia
Event Record	New event			

== Results ==
=== Final ===
Rank	Name	Nationality	5.10	5.25	5.40	5.50	5.55	5.60	5.65	5.70	5.75	5.82	Result	Notes
1st place, gold medalist(s)	Sergey Bubka	Soviet Union	–	–	o	o	–	xxo	–	o	–	xxx	5.70	
2nd place, silver medalist(s)	Konstantin Volkov	Soviet Union	–	–	o	–	–	o	–	x–	xx		5.60	
3rd place, bronze medalist(s)	Atanas Tarev	Bulgaria	–	–	xxo	o	–	o	xxx				5.60	
4	Tadeusz Ślusarski	Poland	–	–	xo	–	o	–	xxx				5.55	
5	Tom Hintnaus	Brazil	–	–	xo	o	–	xx–	x				5.50	
6	Patrick Abada	France	–	–	–	xo	–	xxx					5.50	
7	Miro Zalar	Sweden	–	–	xo	xo	–	xxx					5.50	
8	Władysław Kozakiewicz	Poland	–	–	o	x–	xx						5.40	
8	Thierry Vigneron	France	–	o	o	xxx							5.40	
10	Felix Böhni	Switzerland	–	–	xo	–	xxx						5.40	
10	František Jansa	Czechoslovakia	–	o	xo	xxx							5.40	
10	Vladimir Polyakov	Soviet Union	–	–	xo	–	–	xx–	x				5.40	
13	Jeff Buckingham	United States	–	–	xxo	xxx							5.40	
14	Veijo Vannesluoma	Finland	–	xo	xxo	xxx							5.40	
15	Günther Lohre	West Germany	–	o	–	xxx							5.25	
15	Liang Weiqiang	China	o	o	xxr								5.25	
17	Jürgen Winkler	West Germany	–	xo	xxx								5.25	
18	Timo Kuusisto	Finland	xo	xo	xxx								5.25	
19	Tomomi Takahashi	Japan	o	xxo	xxx								5.25	
20	Alberto Ruiz	Spain	xo	xxx									5.10	
	Pierre Quinon	France	–	–	xxx								NM	
	Hermann Fehringer	Austria	xxx										NM	
	Ivo Yanchev	Bulgaria	–	–	xxx								NM	
	Tapani Haapakoski	Finland	–	xxx									NM	
	Billy Olson	United States	–	–	xxx								NM	
	Mike Tully	United States	–	–	xxx								NM	
	George Barber	Canada	xxx										NM	

== See also ==
- 1980 Men's Olympic Pole Vault (Moscow)
- 1982 Men's European Championships Pole Vault (Athens)
- 1984 Men's Olympic Pole Vault (Los Angeles)
- 1984 Men's Friendship Games Pole Vault (Moscow)
- 1986 Men's European Championships Pole Vault (Stuttgart)
- 1987 Men's World Championships Pole Vault (Rome)
- 1988 Men's Olympic Pole Vault (Seoul)
