= Galin Nikov =

Bulgarian pole vaulter

Galin Nikov (Bulgarian: Галин Ников; born 25 November 1968) is a retired Bulgarian pole vaulter.

He finished thirteenth at the 1990 European Indoor Championships and twelfth at the 1991 World Championships. He also won gold medals at the 1990 and 1992 Balkan Games.

His personal best jump was 5.65 metres, achieved in July 1992 in Sofia. This ranks him seventh among Bulgarian pole vaulters, behind Spas Bukhalov, Atanas Tarev, Nikolay Nikolov, Stanimir Penchev, Delko Lesov and Ilian Efremov. The same jump height was achieved by Ivo Yanchev and Valentin Videv.
