= Tim Bright =

American decathlete and pole vaulter

Personal information
- Nationality: American
- Born: July 28, 1960 (age 65) Taft, California, USA

Sport
- Sport: Athletics
- Events: Pole vault, Decathlon
- College team: Linn-Benton Roadrunners; Abilene Christian Wildcats

Achievements and titles
- Personal bests: Pole vault: 5.85 m (1996); Decathlon: 8,340 (1987)

Timothy William Bright (born July 28, 1960) is an American retired athlete in the pole vault and the decathlon.

== Collegiate career ==
Bright participated in track & field at Linn-Benton Community College from 1978-80, earning NJCAA all-America honors his sophomore year, and then transferred to Abilene Christian University. In 1991, he was elected to the NWAC Hall of Fame.

== International career ==
Bright represented the United States in the decathlon at the 1984 Olympics, the 1988 Olympics, and the 1987 World Championships, and in the pole vault at the 1985 World University Games, the 1985 World Cup, the 1991 World Championships, and the 1992 Olympics.

In 1987, he scored a personal best of 8,340 points in the decathlon at the USA Outdoor Track and Field Championships in San Jose. At one point, he held the decathlon world record for the pole vault at 5.70 m, set during the 1988 Olympics.

In 1991 and 1992, Bright became an American champion the in pole vault. At the British AAA Championships he won the title in 1991 and finished runner-up in 1985 behind Kory Tarpenning and in 1993 behind Australian Simon Arkell.

== Post-career ==
In 2010, Bright took up a coaching career in men's pole vault at Concordia University (Oregon) and Lewis & Clark College. In 2019, he became a volunteer assistant coach for women's track and field at Oregon State University.

== Achievements ==
Year	Tournament	Venue	Result	Event
1984	Summer Olympics	Los Angeles	12th	Decathlon
1985	World Cup	Canberra	3rd	Pole vault
1987	World Championships	Rome	DNF	Decathlon
1988	Summer Olympics	Seoul	7th	Decathlon
1989	World Cup	Barcelona	2nd	Pole vault
1990	Goodwill Games	Seattle	3rd	Pole vault
1991	World Championships	Tokyo	6th	Pole vault
1992	Olympic Games	Barcelona	12th	Pole vault

== Personal bests ==
Information from World Athletics profile unless otherwise noted.

=== Outdoor ===
As of June 20, 2025

Event	Performance	Location	Date	Points
Decathlon	—N/a	San Jose	June 23–24, 1987	8,340 points
100 meters	10.90	San Jose	June 23, 1987	883 points
Long jump	7.31 m (23 ft 11 3/4 in)	San Jose	June 23, 1987	888 points
Shot put	14.35 m (47 ft 3/4 in)	San Jose	June 23, 1987	750 points
High jump	2.11 m (6 ft 11 in)	San Jose	June 23, 1987	906 points
400 meters	48.87	Los Angeles	August 8, 1984	867 points
110 meters hurdles	14.16	San Jose	June 24, 1987	954 points
Discus throw	41.74 m (136 ft 11 1/4 in)	Los Angeles	August 9, 1984	700 points
Pole vault	5.70 m (18 ft 8 1/4 in)	Seoul	September 29, 1988	1,132 points
Javelin throw	61.60 m (202 ft 1 in)	Seoul	September 29, 1988	762 points
1500 meters	4:42.34	Indianapolis	June 18, 1985	666 points
Virtual Best Performance				8,508 points

Event	Performance	Location	Date
Pole vault	5.85 m (19 ft 2 1/4 in)	Monmouth	June 8, 1996

=== Indoor ===
As of June 20, 2025

Event	Performance	Location	Date
Pole vault	5.80 m (19 ft 1/4 in)	Atlanta	March 4, 1995
