= 1986 European Athletics Indoor Championships – Men's pole vault =

The men's pole vault event at the 1986 European Athletics Indoor Championships was held on 23 February.

== Results ==
Rank	Name	Nationality	5.00	5.15	5.30	5.40	5.50	5.55	5.60	5.65	5.70	5.75	5.80	Result	Notes
1st place, gold medalist(s)	Atanas Tarev	Bulgaria	–	–	–	xo	–	–	o	–	o	–	xxx	5.70	
2nd place, silver medalist(s)	Marian Kolasa	Poland	–	–	–	–	–	–	xo	–	xo	–	xxx	5.70	
3rd place, bronze medalist(s)	Philippe Collet	France	–	–	–	–	xo	–	–	o	–	xxx		5.65	
4	Mirosław Chmara	Poland	–	–	–	xo	–	xxo	–	o	–	xxx		5.65	
5	František Jansa	Czechoslovakia	–	–	xo	–	xxo	–	xxx					5.50	
6	Ryszard Kolasa	Poland	–	–	xo	–	xxx							5.30	
6	Philippe Houvion	France	–	–	xo	–	xxx							5.30	
6	Zdeněk Lubenský	Czechoslovakia	–	–	xo	–	xxx							5.30	
9	Gerald Kager	Austria	–	o	xxo	xxx								5.30	
10	Javier García	Spain	o	o	xxx									5.15	
10	Alberto Ruiz	Spain	–	o	xxx									5.15	
12	Marco Andreini	Italy	–	xo	xxx									5.15	
13	Sigurður Sigurðsson	Iceland	xo	xxx										5.00	
