= 1991 World Championships in Athletics – Men's pole vault =

These are the official results of the men's pole vault event at the 1991 IAAF World Championships in Tokyo, Japan. There were a total number of 31 participating athletes, with two qualifying groups and the final held on Thursday August 29, 1991.

== Medalists ==
Gold	Sergey Bubka; Soviet Union (URS)
Silver	István Bagyula; Hungary (HUN)
Bronze	Maksim Tarasov; Soviet Union (URS)

== Schedule ==
- All times are Japan Standard Time (UTC+9)

Qualification Round
Group A	Group B
27.08.1991 – 16:40h	27.08.1991 – 16:40h
Final Round
29.08.1991 – 16:00h

== Results ==
=== Qualifying round ===
Qualification: Qualifying Performance 5.60 (Q) or at least 12 best performers (q) advance to the final.

Rank	Group	Name	Nationality	4.90	5.00	5.10	5.20	5.30	5.40	5.45	5.50	Result	Notes
1	A	Sergey Bubka	Soviet Union	–	–	–	–	–	–	–	o	5.50	q
1	A	Maksim Tarasov	Soviet Union	–	–	–	–	–	–	–	o	5.50	q
1	A	Peter Widén	Sweden									5.50	q
4	A	Thierry Vigneron	France	–	–	–	–	o	–	–	xo	5.50	q
5	A	Galin Nikov	Bulgaria									5.50	q
5	A	Tim Bright	United States	–	–	–	–	–	xo	–	xo	5.50	q
5	A	Jean Galfione	France	–	–	–	–	xo	–	–	xo	5.50	q
8	A	Mike Edwards	Great Britain	–	–	–	o	o	o	–	xxx	5.40	
9	A	Mirosław Chmara	Poland									5.40	
10	A	Simon Arkell	Australia									5.40	
11	A	Nikolay Nikolov	Bulgaria									5.30	
12	A	Kim Chul-kyun	South Korea									5.30	
13	A	Sazan Fisheku	Albania									5.30	
14	A	Alberto Ruiz	Spain									5.20	
	A	Petri Peltoniemi	Finland									NM	
1	B	Radion Gataullin	Soviet Union	–	–	–	–	–	–	–	o	5.50	q
2	B	Bernhard Zintl	Germany	–	–	–	–	o	–	x		5.50	q
3	B	István Bagyula	Hungary	–	–	–	–	xo	xo	–		5.50	q
4	B	Philippe Collet	France	–	–	–	–	–	xxo	–		5.50	q
5	B	Hermann Fehringer	Austria									5.50	q
5	B	Doug Wood	Canada									5.50	q
7	B	Hideyuki Takei	Japan									5.45	
8	B	Joe Dial	United States									5.40	
8	B	Jani Lehtonen	Finland									5.40	
10	B	Paul Gibbons	New Zealand									5.40	
11	B	Zdeněk Lubenský	Czechoslovakia	–	–	–	o	–	xo			5.40	
12	B	Kelly Riley	United States									5.30	
13	B	Javier García	Spain									5.30	
13	B	Delko Lesev	Bulgaria									5.30	
15	B	Edgar Díaz	Puerto Rico									5.20	
16	B	Martin Voss	Denmark									5.20	

=== Final ===
Rank	Name	Nationality	5.20	5.30	5.40	5.50	5.55	5.60	5.65	5.70	5.75	5.80	5.85	5.90	5.95	Result	Notes
1st place, gold medalist(s)	Sergey Bubka	Soviet Union	–	–	–	–	–	–	–	o	–	–	–	x–	xo	5.95	CR
2nd place, silver medalist(s)	István Bagyula	Hungary	–	–	o	xo	–	o	–	o	–	xo	xo	o	xxx	5.90	
3rd place, bronze medalist(s)	Maksim Tarasov	Soviet Union	–	–	–	o	–	–	–	o	–	o	o	xxx		5.85	
4	Radion Gataullin	Soviet Union	–	–	–	–	–	–	–	xo	–	x–	xo	xx–	x	5.85	
5	Peter Widén	Sweden	–	–	o	o	–	o	–	xxo	o	xxx				5.75	NR
6	Tim Bright	United States	–	–	–	xxo	–	–	xo	–	xxo	–	xxx			5.75	
7	Hermann Fehringer	Austria	–	–	o	–	–	o	–	xxx						5.60	
8	Thierry Vigneron	France	–	–	xo	–	–	o	–	xxx						5.60	
9	Bernhard Zintl	Germany	–	o	–	o	–	xxx								5.50	
10	Jean Galfione	France	–	–	o	–	–	xxx								5.40	
11	Doug Wood	Canada	xxo	–	xo	xxx										5.40	
12	Galin Nikov	Bulgaria	–	xo	–	xxx										5.30	
	Philippe Collet	France	–	–	–	xxx										NM	

== See also ==
- 1988 Summer Olympics (Seoul)
- 1990 European Championships (Split)
- 1992 Summer Olympics (Barcelona)
- 1994 European Championships (Helsinki)
