= Ivo Yanchev =

Bulgarian pole vaulter

Ivo Yanchev (Bulgarian: Иво Янчев; born 5 September 1960) is a retired Bulgarian pole vaulter.

He finished eleventh at the 1978 European Indoor Championships, thirteenth at the 1981 European Indoor Championships and twelfth at the 1983 European Indoor Championships He also won gold medals at the 1981 and 1984 Balkan Games. He also competed at the 1983 World Championships without reaching the final.

His personal best jump was 5.65 metres, achieved in July 1983 in Sofia. This ranks him seventh among Bulgarian pole vaulters, behind Spas Bukhalov, Atanas Tarev, Nikolay Nikolov, Stanimir Penchev, Delko Lesеv and Ilian Efremov, and joint with Valentin Videv and Galin Nikov.
