= Mirosław Chmara =

Polish pole vaulter (born 1964)

Personal information
- Nationality: Polish
- Born: 9 May 1964 Bydgoszcz, Poland
- Height: 2.01 m (6 ft 7 in)
- Weight: 86 kg (190 lb)

Sport
- Event: Pole vault
- Club: BKS Bydgoszcz; Zawisza Bydgoszcz
- Coached by: Roman Dakiniewicz
Medal record
Representing Poland
Men's athletics
European Indoor Championships
Bronze medal – third place	1989 The Hague	Pole vault

Mirosław Marian Chmara (Polish pronunciation: [miˈrɔswaf ˈxmara]; born 9 May 1964, in Bydgoszcz) is a retired pole vaulter from Poland. His personal best jump of 5.90 metres was achieved in June 1988 in Villeneuve-d'Ascq, and was also a Polish record for 23 years. It was beaten by Paweł Wojciechowski who jumped 5.91 metres in August 2011 in Szczecin.

He is a cousin of a former decathlete, Sebastian Chmara.

== Achievements ==
Year	Competition	Venue	Position	Notes
Representing Poland
1986	European Indoor Championships	Madrid, Spain	4th	5.65 m
1987	World Championships	Rome, Italy	16th (q)	5.20 m
1988	European Indoor Championships	Budapest, Hungary	4th	5.70 m
1988	Olympic Games	Seoul, South Korea	4th (q)	5.40 m
1989	European Indoor Championships	The Hague, Netherlands	3rd	5.70 m
1989	World Indoor Championships	Budapest, Hungary	4th	5.60 m
1991	World Indoor Championships	Seville, Spain	10th	5.50 m
1991	World Championships	Tokyo, Japan	16th (q)	5.40 m

== See also ==
- Polish records in athletics
