= Vasiliy Bubka =

Ukrainian pole vaulter

Medal record

Men's athletics

Representing Soviet Union

European Championships
Silver medal – second place	1986 Stuttgart	Pole vault

Vasiliy Bubka (Ukrainian: Василь Бубка, romanized: Vasyl' Bubka; born 26 November 1960 in Voroshilovgrad) is a retired pole vaulter who represented the USSR and later Ukraine. His personal best was 5.86 metres, achieved in July 1988 in Chelyabinsk.

Bubka is the older brother of pole vaulting world record holder Sergey Bubka and father of pole vaulter Oleksandr Bubka, born 1986.

== Achievements ==
Year	Competition	Venue	Position	Notes
Representing the Soviet Union
1985	World Indoor Games	Paris, France	3rd	5.60 m
1985	European Indoor Championships	Piraeus, Greece	4th	5.60 m
1986	Goodwill Games	Moscow, Soviet Union	6th	5.60 m
1986	European Championships	Stuttgart, West Germany	2nd	5.75 m
Representing Ukraine
1993	World Championships	Stuttgart, Germany	9th	5.70 m
1994	Goodwill Games	St. Petersburg, Russia	5th	5.60 m
1996	Olympic Games	Atlanta, United States	–	NM
