= Iliyan Efremov =

Bulgarian pole vaulter

Iliyan Efremov (Cyrillic: Илиян Ефремов; born 2 August 1970) is a Bulgarian pole vaulter.

He finished tenth at the 1988 World Junior Championships and thirteenth at the 2006 European Championships. He also won gold medals at the 1996, 1997, 1998, 2000, 2002 and 2003 Balkan Games. In addition he competed at the Olympic Games in 2000 and 2004 as well as the World Championships in 1997 and 2003 without reaching the final.

His personal best jump was 5.70 metres, achieved in June 1998 in Sofia. This ranks him fourth among Bulgarian pole vaulters, behind Spas Bukhalov, Atanas Tarev, Nikolay Nikolov, and joint with Stanimir Penchev and Delko Lesev.
