= Hiroyuki Sano =

Japanese pole vaulter

Personal information
- Nationality: Japanese
- Born: 6 October 1968 (age 57)

Sport
- Sport: Athletics
- Event: Pole vault

Hiroyuki Sano (佐野 浩之, Sano Hiroyuki; born 6 October 1968) is a Japanese athlete. He competed in the men's pole vault at the 1992 Summer Olympics.
