= Zdeněk Lubenský =

Czech pole vaulter

Personal information
- Nationality: Czech
- Born: 3 December 1962 (age 63) Kutná Hora, Czechoslovakia

Sport
- Sport: Athletics
- Event: Pole vault

Zdeněk Lubenský (born 3 December 1962) is a Czech athlete. He competed in the men's pole vault at the 1988 Summer Olympics.

== International competitions ==
| Year | Competition | Venue | Position | Notes |
Representing Czechoslovakia
| 1985 | European Indoor Championships | Paris, France | 13th | 5.00 m |
| 1986 | European Indoor Championships | Madrid, Spain | 6th | 5.30 m |
| 1986 | European Championships | Stuttgart, West Germany | 6th | 5.55 m |
| 1987 | Universiade | Zagreb, Yugoslavia | 8th | 5.30 m |
| 1987 | World Championships | Rome, Italy | 10th (q) | 5.40 m (Note: No mark in the final) |
| 1988 | Olympic Games | Seoul, South Korea | 11th | 5.50 m |
| 1989 | European Indoor Championships | The Hague, Netherlands | 14th | 5.30 m |
| 1991 | World Championships | Tokyo, Japan | 20th (q) | 5.40 m |
| 1992 | European Indoor Championships | Genoa, Italy | 11th | 5.30 m |
Representing the Czech Republic
| 1993 | World Championships | Stuttgart, Germany | 36th (q) | 5.25 m |
