= Athletics at the 1998 Asian Games – Men's pole vault =

Men's pole vault at the 1998 Asian Games
- Venue: Thammasat Stadium
- Dates: 15 December 1998
- Competitors: 10 from 8 nations

Medalists
gold medal	Igor Potapovich	Kazakhstan
silver medal	Kim Chul-kyun	South Korea
bronze medal	Fumiaki Kobayashi	Japan

The men's pole vault competition at the 1998 Asian Games in Bangkok, Thailand was held on 15 December at the Thammasat Stadium.

== Schedule ==
All times are Indochina Time (UTC+07:00)

Date	Time	Event
Tuesday, 15 December 1998	13:30	Final

== Results ==
Legend

- NM — No mark

Rank	Athlete	Result	Notes
1st place, gold medalist(s)	Igor Potapovich (KAZ)	5.55	
2nd place, silver medalist(s)	Kim Chul-kyun (KOR)	5.40	
3rd place, bronze medalist(s)	Fumiaki Kobayashi (JPN)	5.20	
4	Ahmed Abdulkarim Youssef (QAT)	5.20	
4	Xu Gang (CHN)	5.20	
6	Chen Lu-sheng (TPE)	5.00	
7	Yang Mu-hui (TPE)	4.80	
—	Anant Som-aum (THA)	NM	
—	Ruwan Pradeep Perera (SRI)	NM	
—	Alexandr Korchagin (KAZ)	NM	
