= Kim Chul-kyun =

South Korean pole vaulter

Personal information
- Born: 28 February 1969 (age 57) Ulsan, South Korea

Sport
- Sport: Track and field
Medal record
Representing South Korea
Asian Games
Silver medal – second place	1998 Bangkok	Pole vault
Bronze medal – third place	1990 Beijing	Pole vault
Bronze medal – third place	1994 Hiroshima	Pole vault
Asian Championships
Silver medal – second place	1995 Jakarta	Pole vault
Bronze medal – third place	1993 Manila	Pole vault

- Kim Chul-kyun
- Hangul: 김철균
- RR: Gim Cheolgyun
- MR: Kim Ch'ŏlgyun

Kim Chul-Kyun (Korean: 김철균; born 28 February 1969) is a retired male pole vaulter from South Korea. His personal best jump is 5.53 metres, achieved in May 1995 in Songnam.

== International competitions ==
Year	Competition	Venue	Position	Notes
Representing South Korea
1988	Olympic Games	Seoul, South Korea	16th (q)	5.30 m
1989	Universiade	Duisburg, West Germany	11th	5.20 m
1990	Asian Games	Beijing, China	3rd	5.40 m
1991	World Indoor Championships	Seville, Spain	–	NM
1991	Universiade	Sheffield, United Kingdom	6th	5.40 m
1991	World Championships	Tokyo, Japan	23rd (q)	5.30 m
1992	Olympic Games	Barcelona, Spain	–	NM
1993	Asian Championships	Manila, Philippines	3rd	5.20 m
1994	Asian Games	Hiroshima, Japan	3rd	5.40 m
1995	World Championships	Gothenburg, Sweden	21st (q)	5.40 m
1995	Asian Championships	Jakarta, Indonesia	2nd	5.30 m
1996	Olympic Games	Atlanta, United States	24th (q)	5.40 m
1997	East Asian Games	Busan, South Korea	2nd	5.40 m
1998	Asian Games	Bangkok, Thailand	2nd	5.40 m
