= Timo Kuusisto =

Finnish pole vaulter

Personal information
- Born: 28 June 1959 (age 66)

Sport
- Sport: Track and field

Timo Kuusisto (born 28 June 1959) is a retired Finnish pole vaulter.

He finished eighteenth at the 1983 World Championships. He also competed at the 1982 European Championships and the 1987 World Championships.

His personal best jump was 5.61 metres, achieved in July 1987 in Somero.
