= Athletics at the 1988 Summer Olympics – Men's pole vault =

Men's pole vault at the Games of the XXIV Olympiad
- Olympic Stadium (2012)
- Venue: Olympic Stadium
- Dates: 23 September 1988 (qualifying); 25 September 1988 (final)
- Competitors: 21 from 13 nations
- Winning height: 5.90 OR

Medalists
1st place, gold medalist(s)		Sergey Bubka; Soviet Union
2nd place, silver medalist(s)		Rodion Gataullin; Soviet Union
3rd place, bronze medalist(s)		Grigoriy Yegorov; Soviet Union

Official Video Highlights

The men's pole vault at the 1988 Summer Olympics in Seoul, South Korea had an entry list of 21 competitors from 13 nations, with two qualifying groups (21 jumpers) before the final (15) took place on Wednesday September 28, 1988. The maximum number of athletes per nation had been set at 3 since the 1930 Olympic Congress.

Three Soviet, French and American athletes made the final, but it was the Soviet bloc that dominated the event, sweeping the medals, with Sergey Bubka already the dominant vaulter. His world record of 6.06 metres, set two months earlier, has only since been cleared by three other men, 2008 gold medalist Steven Hooker, 2012 gold medalist Renaud Lavillenie, and 2020 and 2024 gold medalist Armand Duplantis in 2020.

But while Bubka would vault in three more Olympics and would continue to dominate the World Championships with six consecutive wins, this would be the only Olympic medal he would achieve. It was also the only victory the Soviet Union had in the men's pole vault, though the Unified Team (ex-USSR countries) would win in 1992.

Rodion Gataullin and Grigoriy Yegorov completed the medal sweep for the Soviet team; it was the fourth pole vault medal sweep (the United States had done it in 1904, 1924, and 1928). The 1988 Games were the first in which the United States competed in the pole vault, but failed to medal.

== Background ==
This was the 21st appearance of the event, which is one of 12 athletics events to have been held at every Summer Olympics. The returning finalists from the 1984 Games were the two bronze medalists, Earl Bell of the United States and Thierry Vigneron of France. Sergey Bubka of the Soviet Union was dominant: he had won the 1983 and 1987 world championships, the 1986 European championship, and set the world record nine times between 1984 and 1988, becoming the only man to have cleared 6 metres.

South Korea made its men's pole vaulting debut. The United States made its 20th appearance, most of any nation, having missed only the boycotted 1980 Games.

== Competition format ==
The competition used the two-round format introduced in 1912, with results cleared between rounds. Vaulters received three attempts at each height. Ties were broken by the countback rule.

In the qualifying round, the bar was set at 5.10 metres, 5.20 metres, 5.30 metres, 5.40 metres, 5.45 metres, 5.50 metres, and 5.55 metres. The first two heights were only used in the second qualifying group. All vaulters clearing 5.55 metres advanced to the final. If fewer than 12 cleared that height, the top 12 (including ties) advanced.

In the final, the bar was set at 5.10 metres, 5.25 metres, 5.40 metres, 5.50 metres, 5.60 metres, and then increased by 5 centimetres as a time.

== Records ==
These were the standing world and Olympic records (in metres) prior to the 1988 Summer Olympics.

World record	Sergey Bubka (URS)	6.06	Nice, France	10 July 1988
Olympic record	Władysław Kozakiewicz (POL)	5.78	Moscow, Soviet Union	30 July 1980

When the bar was raised to 5.80 metres, giving vaulters a chance to break the Olympic record, only the three Soviets remained in the competition. Grigoriy Yegorov was the only one to jump at 5.80 metres, becoming the first to break the Olympic record. Rodion Gataullin jumped successfully at 5.85 metres, breaking Yegorov's new record while Yegorov passed. At 5.90 metres, Sergey Bubka broke Gataullin's record with a mark that stood at the end of the Games, as none of the three could clear further.

== Schedule ==
All times are Korea Standard Time adjusted for daylight savings (UTC+10)

Date	Time	Round
Monday, 26 September 1988		Qualifying
Wednesday, 28 September 1988	12:00	Final

== Results ==
Key

- o = Height cleared
- x = Height failed
- – = Height passed
- r = Retired
- SB = Season's best
- PB = Personal best
- NR = National record
- AR = Area record
- OR = Olympic record
- WR = World record
- WL = World lead
- NM = No mark
- DNS = Did not start
- DQ = Disqualified

=== Qualifying ===
The qualifying round was held on Monday September 26, 1988. After a dispute regarding disparate raising increments between the groups, all 15 of the vaulters who had cleared 5.40 metres were advanced to the final.

Rank	Group	Athlete	Nation	5.10	5.20	5.30	5.40	5.45	5.50	5.55	Height	Notes
1	A	Rodion Gataullin	Soviet Union	–	–	–	–	–	o	–	5.50	q
1	A	Sergey Bubka	Soviet Union	–	–	–	–	–	o	–	5.50	q
3	A	Grigoriy Yegorov	Soviet Union	–	–	–	–	o	–	–	5.45	q
4	A	Kory Tarpenning	United States	–	–	–	o	–	–	x–	5.40	q
4	A	Earl Bell	United States	–	–	–	o	–	–	x–	5.40	q
4	A	Mirosław Chmara	Poland	–	–	–	o	–	–	–	5.40	q
4	B	Marian Kolasa	Poland	–	–	–	o	–	–	–	5.40	q
8	B	Asko Peltoniemi	Finland	–	–	xxo	o	–	–	–	5.40	q
9	A	Billy Olson	United States	–	–	–	xo	–	–	–	5.40	q
9	A	Philippe Collet	France	–	–	–	xo	–	–	–	5.40	q
9	A	Hermann Fehringer	Austria	–	–	o	xo	–	–	–	5.40	q
9	B	Zdeněk Lubenský	Czechoslovakia	–	o	o	xo	–	–	–	5.40	q
9	B	Philippe d'Encausse	France	–	o	–	xo	–	–	–	5.40	q
9	B	István Bagyula	Hungary	o	o	o	xo	–	–	–	5.40	q
15	B	Thierry Vigneron	France	o	o	xo	xo	–	–	–	5.40	q
16	B	Kim Chul-Kyun	South Korea	xo	xo	xo	xxx	—N/a			5.30	
17	B	Paul Just	Canada	xo	o	xxo	xxx	—N/a			5.30	
—	A	Atanas Tarev	Bulgaria	–	–	–	xxx	—N/a			No mark	
—	B	Lee Jae-bok	South Korea	xxx	—N/a						No mark	
—	B	Javier García	Spain	xxx	—N/a						No mark	
—	B	Andy Ashurst	Great Britain	xxx	—N/a						No mark	

=== Final ===
The final was held on Wednesday September 28, 1988.

Rank	Athlete	Nation	5.10	5.25	5.40	5.50	5.60	5.65	5.70	5.75	5.80	5.85	5.90	5.95	6.10	Height	Notes
1st place, gold medalist(s)	Sergey Bubka	Soviet Union	–	–	–	–	–	–	xo	–	–	–	xxo	–	x	5.90	OR
2nd place, silver medalist(s)	Rodion Gataullin	Soviet Union	–	–	–	–	–	–	o	–	–	xxo	–	xxx	—N/a	5.85	
3rd place, bronze medalist(s)	Grigoriy Yegorov	Soviet Union	–	–	–	o	–	–	xo	–	o	–	xxx	—N/a		5.80	
4	Earl Bell	United States	–	–	o	–	o	–	o	xxx	—N/a					5.70	
5	Thierry Vigneron	France	–	xo	–	o	o	–	xo	x	—N/a					5.70	
5	Philippe Collet	France	–	–	–	xo	–	–	xo	xxx	—N/a					5.70	
7	István Bagyula	Hungary	o	o	o	o	o	xxx	—N/a							5.60	
8	Philippe d'Encausse	France	–	–	o	x–	xo	–	xxx	—N/a						5.60	
9	Asko Peltoniemi	Finland	–	–	o	–	xxo	–	xxx	—N/a						5.60	
10	Kory Tarpenning	United States	–	–	–	o	–	xxx	—N/a							5.50	
11	Zdeněk Lubenský	Czechoslovakia	–	xo	–	o	–	xxx	—N/a							5.50	
12	Billy Olson	United States	–	–	–	xxo	–	xxx	—N/a							5.50	
13	Hermann Fehringer	Austria	–	o	o	xxx	—N/a									5.40	
—	Mirosław Chmara	Poland	–	–	–	–	xxx	—N/a								No mark	
—	Marian Kolasa	Poland	–	–	–	xxx	—N/a									No mark	

== See also ==
- 1984 Men's Olympic Pole Vault (Los Angeles)
- 1986 Men's European Championships Pole Vault (Stuttgart)
- 1987 Men's World Championships Pole Vault (Rome)
- 1990 Men's European Championships Pole Vault (Split)
- 1991 Men's World Championships Pole Vault (Tokyo)
- 1992 Men's Olympic Pole Vault (Barcelona)
