= 1985 European Athletics Indoor Championships – Men's pole vault =

The men's pole vault event at the 1985 European Athletics Indoor Championships was held on 3 March.

== Results ==
| Rank | Name | Nationality | 5.00 | 5.15 | 5.30 | 5.40 | 5.50 | 5.55 | 5.60 | 5.70 | 5.75 | 5.86 | Result | Notes |
|---|---|---|---|---|---|---|---|---|---|---|---|---|---|---|
| 1st place, gold medalist(s) | Sergey Bubka | Soviet Union | – | – | – | – | xo | – | – | xo | – | xxx | 5.70 | |
| 2nd place, silver medalist(s) | Aleksandr Krupskiy | Soviet Union | – | – | xo | – | o | – | xo | xo | xxx | | 5.70 | |
| 3rd place, bronze medalist(s) | Atanas Tarev | Bulgaria | – | – | o | – | o | – | o | xx– | x | | 5.60 | |
| 4 | Vasiliy Bubka | Soviet Union | – | – | xo | – | xo | – | xo | xxx | | | 5.60 | |
| 5 | Ryszard Kolasa | Poland | – | – | xo | o | o | xxx | | | | | 5.60 | |
| 6 | Alberto Ruiz | Spain | – | xo | – | xxo | xxo | – | xxx | | | | 5.50 | |
| 7 | Serge Ferreira | France | – | – | – | o | – | – | xxx | | | | 5.40 | |
| 7 | Miro Zalar | Sweden | – | – | – | o | – | xxx | | | | | 5.40 | |
| 9 | Hermann Fehringer | Austria | – | o | xxo | o | xxx | | | | | | 5.40 | |
| 10 | Marian Kolasa | Poland | – | – | – | xo | – | xxx | | | | | 5.40 | |
| 10 | Gerhard Schmidt | West Germany | o | o | o | xo | xxx | | | | | | 5.40 | |
| 12 | František Jansa | Czechoslovakia | – | o | xo | xx– | x | | | | | | 5.30 | |
| 12 | Philippe Houvion | France | – | – | xo | – | xxx | | | | | | 5.30 | |
| 14 | Gerald Kager | Austria | – | xo | xo | xxx | | | | | | | 5.30 | |
| 15 | Mariusz Klimczyk | Poland | – | – | xxo | – | x– | xx | | | | | 5.30 | |
| 16 | Manfred Reichert | West Germany | – | o | xxx | | | | | | | | 5.15 | |
| | Rumen Stoyanov | Bulgaria | – | – | xxx | | | | | | | | NM | |
| | Thierry Vigneron | France | – | – | – | – | – | – | xxx | | | | NM | |
