= Marian Kolasa =

Polish pole vaulter

Personal information
- Nationality: Polish
- Born: 12 August 1959 (age 66) Gdańsk, Poland
- Height: 1.96 m (6 ft 5 in)
- Weight: 90 kg (198 lb)

Sport
- Sport: Athletics
- Event: Pole vault
- Club: Bałtyk Gdynia
- Coached by: Edward Szymczak
Medal record
Representing Poland
European Indoor Championships
Silver medal – second place	1986 Madrid	Pole vault
Bronze medal – third place	1986 Liévin	Pole vault

Marian Kolasa (born 12 August 1959 in Gdańsk, Pomorskie) is a retired Polish pole vaulter. He won two medals at the European Indoor Championships. His personal best was 5.80 metres, achieved in September 1986 in Kamp-Lintfort. He is the older brother of fellow pole vaulters, Ryszard and Adam.

== International competitions ==
Year	Competition	Venue	Position	Notes
1981	Universiade	Bucharest, Romania	10th	5.30 m
1983	European Indoor Championships	Budapest, Hungary	18th	5.20 m
1984	European Indoor Championships	Gothenburg, Sweden	7th	5.50 m
1984	Friendship Games	Moscow, Soviet Union	5th	5.50 m
1985	World Indoor Games	Paris, France	4th	5.50 m
1985	European Indoor Championships	Piraeus, Greece	10th	5.40 m
1986	European Indoor Championships	Madrid, Spain	2nd	5.70 m
1987	European Indoor Championships	Liévin, France	3rd	5.80 m
1987	World Indoor Championships	Indianapolis, United States	5th	5.75 m
1987	World Championships	Rome, Italy	4th	5.80 m
1988	Olympic Games	Seoul, South Korea	4th (q)	5.40 m^{1}
1989	European Indoor Championships	The Hague, Netherlands	4th	5.60 m

^{1}No mark in the final
