= Miro Zalar =

Swedish pole vaulter

Kazimir ("Miro") Zalar (born 24 March 1957 in Ljubljana) is a retired Swedish pole vaulter. He was born in Slovenia, but came to Sweden and Karlskrona at a young age.

His personal best jump of 5.70 metres was achieved in 1986 in Nyköping. This was also the Swedish record at the time. In 2007 he ranked seventh on the Swedish all-time list, behind Oscar Janson, Patrik Kristiansson, Martin Eriksson, Alhaji Jeng, Patrik Stenlund and Peter Widén. He has since then also been surpassed by Melker Svärd Jacobsson and Armand Duplantis.

== International competitions ==
Year	Competition	Venue	Position	Notes
Representing Sweden
1980	European Indoor Championships	Sindelfingen, West Germany	12th	5.30 m
1980	Olympic Games	Moscow, Soviet Union	10th	5.35 m
1981	European Indoor Championships	Grenoble, France	14th	5.35 m
1982	European Indoor Championships	Milan, Italy	8th	5.40 m
1982	European Championships	Athens, Greece	4th	5.55 m
1983	European Indoor Championships	Budapest, Hungary	6th	5.45 m
1983	World Championships	Helsinki, Finland	7th	5.50 m
1984	European Indoor Championships	Gothenburg, Sweden	8th	5.30 m
1984	Olympic Games	Los Angeles, United States	–	NM
1985	European Indoor Championships	Piraeus, Greece	7th	5.40 m
1987	European Indoor Championships	Liévin, France	12th	5.30 m
1987	World Championships	Rome, Italy	12th	5.30 m
1988	European Indoor Championships	Budapest, Hungary	10th	5.50 m
