= Veijo Vannesluoma =

Finnish pole vaulter

Personal information
- Born: 29 July 1958 (age 67) Helsinki, Finland

Sport
- Sport: Track and field

Veijo Erkki Vannesluoma (born 29 July 1958) is a retired Finnish pole vaulter. He finished fourteenth at the 1983 World Championships. He became Finnish champion in 1983. His personal best jump was 5.55 metres (18.2 ft), achieved in July 1983 in Lappeenranta.
