= Bernhard Zintl =

German pole vaulter (born 1965)

Personal information
- Born: 16 June 1965 (age 61) Munich, West Germany

Sport
- Sport: Track and field
Medal record
Representing West Germany
Summer Universiade
Gold medal – first place	1989 Duisburg	Pole vault

Bernhard Zintl (born 16 June 1965) is a retired male pole vaulter from Germany, who represented West Germany during his career. He set his personal best (5.65 metres) on 26 August 1989 in the final of the 1989 Summer Universiade in Duisburg, earning him a gold medal.

== Achievements ==
Year	Competition	Venue	Position	Notes
Representing West Germany
1986	European Championships	Stuttgart, West Germany	16th (q)	5.20 m
1987	World Championships	Rome, Italy	15th	5.30 m
1988	European Indoor Championships	Budapest, Hungary	8th	5.50 m
1989	European Indoor Championships	The Hague, Netherlands	4th	5.60 m
1989	World Indoor Championships	Budapest, Hungary	5th	5.60 m
1989	Universiade	Duisburg, West Germany	1st	5.65 m
1990	European Championships	Split, Yugoslavia	—	NM
Representing Germany
1991	World Indoor Championships	Seville, Spain	8th	5.50 m
1991	World Championships	Tokyo, Japan	9th	5.50 m
