= Philippe Collet =

French pole vaulter (born 1963)

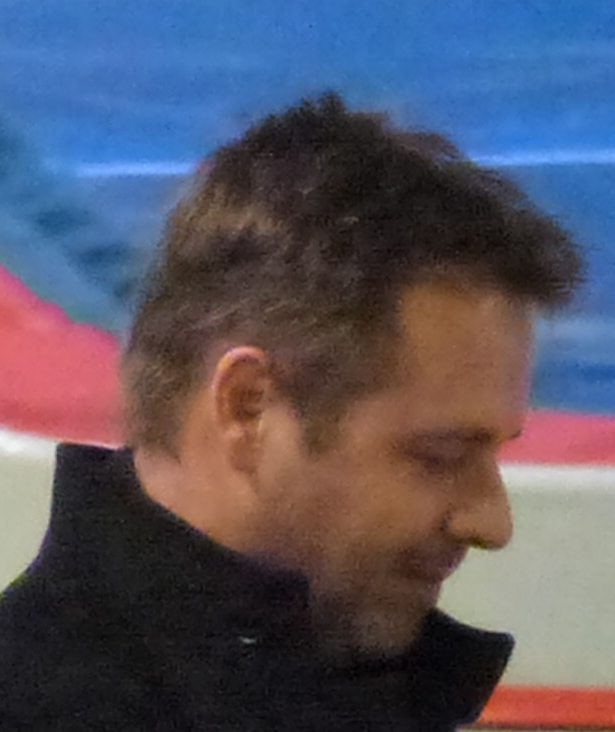

Personal information
- Born: 13 December 1963 (age 62) Nancy, France
- Height: 1.77 m (5 ft 10 in)
- Weight: 76 kg (168 lb)

Sport
- Sport: Athletics
- Event: Pole vault
- Club: ASPTT Grenoble
Medal record
Men's athletics
Representing France
European Championships
Bronze medal – third place	1986 Stuttgart	Pole vault
European Indoor Championships
Bronze medal – third place	1986 Madrid	Pole vault
Universiade
Silver medal – second place	1985 Kobe	Pole vault

Philippe Collet (born 13 December 1963) is a retired French pole vaulter. He twice competed at the Olympic Games, in 1988 and 1992, reaching the final on both occasions. In addition, he represented Europe at the World Cup three times finishing second in 1985 and 1992 and first in 1989.

His personal bests in the event are 5.85 metres outdoors (Paris 1986) and 5.94 metres indoors (Grenoble 1990).

He now coaches his two sons, Thibaut and Mathieu.

== International competitions ==
Year	Competition	Venue	Position	Notes
Representing France
1983	Universiade	Edmonton, Canada	6th	5.20 m
1985	Universiade	Kobe, Japan	2nd	5.70 m
1985	World Cup	Canberra, Australia	2nd	5.50 m^{1}
1986	European Indoor Championships	Madrid, Spain	3rd	5.65 m
1986	European Championships	Stuttgart, West Germany	3rd	5.75 m
1987	European Indoor Championships	Liévin, France	4th	5.75 m
1988	European Indoor Championships	Budapest, Hungary	5th	5.60 m
1988	Olympic Games	Seoul, South Korea	5th	5.70 m
1989	World Cup	Barcelona, Spain	1st	5.75 m^{1}
1990	European Championships	Split, Yugoslavia	4th	5.70 m
1991	World Championships	Tokyo, Japan	—	NM
1992	European Indoor Championships	Genoa, Italy	11th	5.40 m
1992	Olympic Games	Barcelona, Spain	7th	5.55 m
1992	World Cup	Havana, Cuba	2nd	5.40 m^{1}
1994	European Championships	Helsinki, Finland	4th	5.80 m

^{1}Representing Europe

== See also ==
- French all-time top lists - Pole vault
