= František Jansa =

Czech pole vaulter

Personal information
- Born: 12 September 1962 (age 63)
- Height: 1.80 m (5 ft 11 in)
- Weight: 72 kg (159 lb)

Sport
- Sport: Athletics
- Event: Pole vault

František Jansa (born 12 September 1962) is a Czech former athlete who specialised in the pole vault. He represented Czechoslovakia at the 1983 World Championships finishing tenth in the final. In addition, he was the 1981 European Junior Championships gold medallist.

His personal bests in the event are 5.62 metres outdoors (Prague 1983) and 5.55 metres indoors (Prague 1985).

== International competitions ==
Year	Competition	Venue	Position	Notes
Representing Czechoslovakia
1981	European Junior Championships	Utrecht, Netherlands	1st	5.35 m
1982	European Indoor Championships	Milan, Italy	12th	5.00 m
1982	European Championships	Athens, Greece	7th	5.50 m
1983	European Indoor Championships	Budapest, Hungary	7th	5.40 m
1983	World Championships	Helsinki, Finland	10th	5.40 m
1984	European Indoor Championships	Gothenburg, Sweden	12th	5.20 m
1985	World Indoor Games	Paris, France	10th	5.20 m
1985	European Indoor Championships	Piraeus, Greece	12th	5.30 m
1986	European Indoor Championships	Madrid, Spain	5th	5.50 m
1986	Goodwill Games	Moscow, Soviet Union	7th	5.40 m
1986	European Championships	Stuttgart, West Germany	9th	5.35 m
