= Linn–Benton Community College =

Public college in Linn County, Oregon, US

Coordinates: 44°35′13″N 123°06′54″W

Linn-Benton Community College
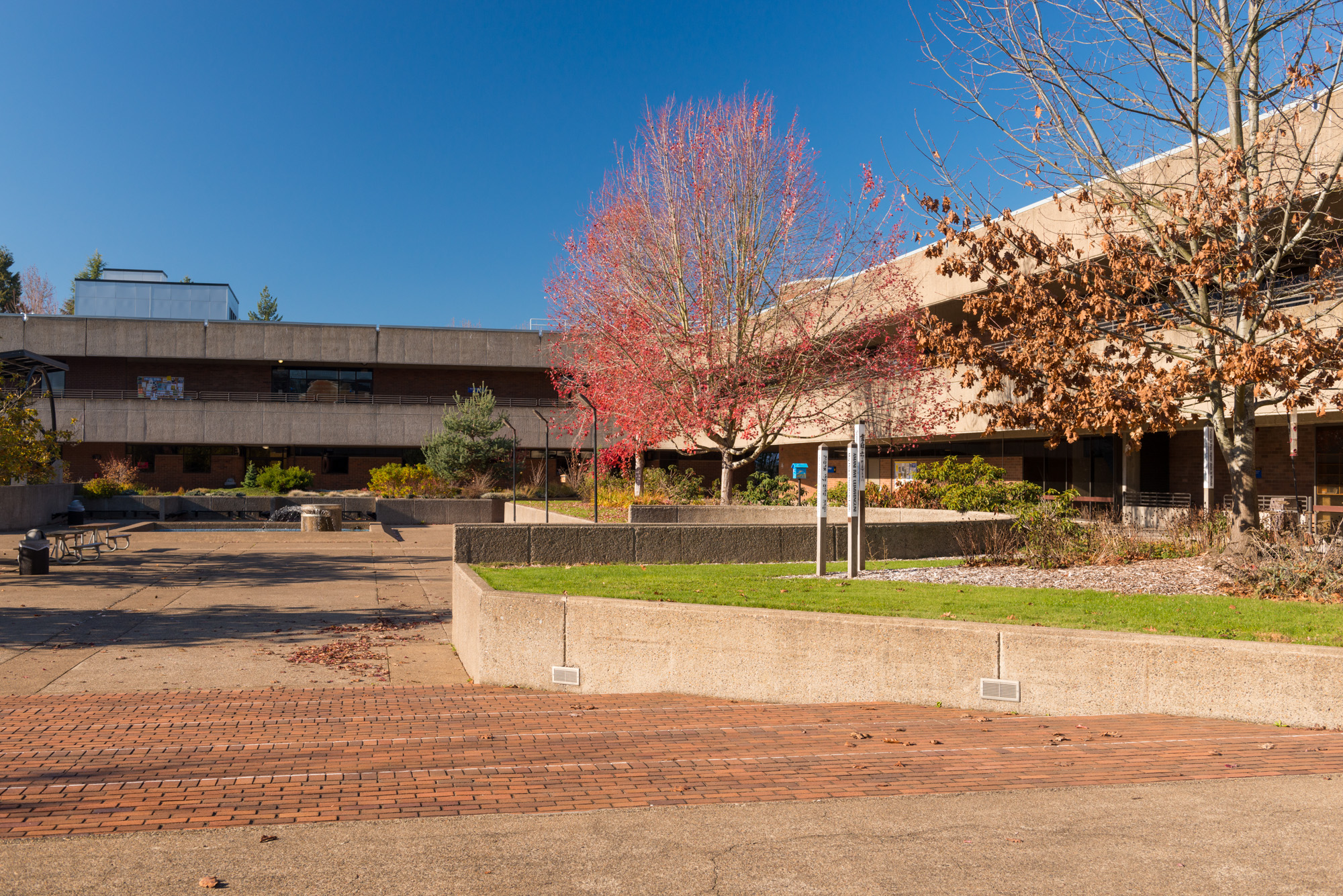
- Linn-Benton Community College near Albany.
- Type: Public community college
- Established: 1966; 60 years ago
- Accreditation: NWCCU
- Academic affiliations: Space-grant
- President: Lisa Avery
- Total staff: 409 (spring 2023)
- Students: 12,557 (spring 2023
- Location: Albany, Oregon, United States
- Campus: Albany, Corvallis & Lebanon
- Colors: Blue, gold and white
- Sporting affiliations: NWAC
- Mascot: Rocky the Roadrunner
- Website: www.linnbenton.edu

Linn–Benton Community College (LBCC) is a public community college with five locations in Linn and Benton County, Oregon. LBCC is the sixth largest of Oregon's seventeen community colleges, educating more than 12,000 students per year. The college offers more than 80 degree programs and certificates.

== History ==
LBCC was established in 1966 with the purpose of supporting the citizens of Linn and Benton counties.

In the 1960s a community college was a conceptual idea, however, it wasn't until 1964 that a study was conducted to assess the need of such an institution. The results of this study showed that post-high school opportunities, educationally, were non-existent and that many graduating high school students were interested in a local community college.

It was then that Linn County asked for the support of Benton County in assistance for foundation of a college in the mid-Willamette Valley. This partnership reached success on December 6, 1966, when, by referendum vote, Linn and Benton County voters approved the formation of a college district by nearly 3:1.

The first classes began in 1967 during the same year LBCC started operations full-time. The campus headquarters was located on the corner of First St. and Ellsworth St., however, classes were offered at rented locations throughout the LBCC college district. Before the current campus in Albany was dedicated in 1974, students were called "Roadrunners" since the campus was scattered in several locations all over Albany, forcing students to commute between buildings across town.

During this time, six occupational programs were offered. This included a sewage waste/treatment program that was described to be the "first of its kind offered in the country". Tuition was $60 per term.

In February 1970 a permanent campus was slated for construction based on a vote by voters in Linn and Benton counties. Voters agreed that bonds should be issued to pay for construction. The ideal location for the campus was two miles (3.2 km) south of Albany, off of Pacific Blvd. The campus was dedicated in October 1974. Takena Hall, the campus student union was completed in 1979.

In May 1998, a dual enrollment program was established between Oregon State University and LBCC in the fields of agricultural sciences, business and engineering. This was extended to all programs in 1999.

In July 2009 the LBCC-OSU dual enrollment program was honored nationally by National Association of Student Personnel Administrators as an "exemplary and innovative program." In the fall of 2009, there were nearly 1,500 students in the program.

In 2022, the Linn County community passed a $16 million general obligation bond, which will be used to construct a new Agriculture Center three miles from the main Albany LBCC campus, renovate and re-open the LBCC childcare center, and make critical repairs to aging facilities. This bond opened a matching appropriation from the state of Oregon for $8 million.

In 2023, enrollment had decreased by over 30 percent since the record enrollment height of 2018. As a result of this, the extension center in Sweet Home was closed. Enrollment in 2023 was just over 12,500, with 2,500 full-time students, over 3,000 in the OSU-LBCC Dual Enrollment Program, 1,000 in Western Oregon University-LBCC Dual Enrollment Program and 1,000 in the Oregon Tech-LBCC Dual Enrollment Program.

== Academics ==
LBCC is accredited by the Northwest Commission on Colleges and Universities. Lower division collegiate credits earned at LBCC may be transferred to any public university in Oregon. There is also a degree partnership with Oregon State University for those seeking a bachelor's degree. The college offers more than 80 degree programs and certificates. LBCC is the sixth largest of Oregon's seventeen community colleges, educating more than 12,000 students per year, with an academic staff of over 400 (as of Spring 2023)

== Campuses ==
The main campus is located on 104 acres (42 ha) on Oregon Route 99E (Pacific Blvd) in Albany, Oregon, just 11 miles (18 km) east of Corvallis, Oregon. It consists of 13 brick buildings in the Brutalist style, and 7 additional contemporary buildings, for a total of 20. These buildings are on the perimeter of a large courtyard, while a covered walkway connects the buildings and is adjacent to the courtyard. A geologic timeline covering Earth's history stretches along the sidewalk on the south side of the buildings.

The main campus is home to the LBCC bookstore, a coffee shop, and 2 eateries; the Courtyard Café and the Santiam Café & Bistro.

There are also three art galleries in the main campus buildings: The South Santiam Hall Gallery, the North Santiam Hall Galleries, and the Calapooia Gallery.

The Russell Tripp Performance Center on campus has seating for up to 456 guests, with an additional wheelchair-accessible row (total occupancy: 469), with professional sound and stage lighting with 'Proscenium style' theater seating, with ample wing/backstage space.

The Takena Hall Student Union is the main hub on campus.

To the West of the main brick structure is The "LBCC Activities Center", which was built in 1971.The LB Activities Center is the central hub of athletics and recreation on campus. The main gymnasium features a newly installed (2018) wood floor and bleacher seating for 1,000 spectators. The Activities Center is home to all athletics staff, Health and Human Performance academic programs and faculty, classrooms, locker rooms and administrative operations. The "LB Fitness Center" was opened in 1996 as an addition to the Activities Center building. The facility includes free weights, circuit training machines and a variety of cardiovascular training equipment. The facility is used by LBCC teams for strength and conditioning training, Health and Human Performance program classes, as well as by campus students, faculty and staff for recreational use.

Adjacent to the "LBCC Activities Center" is the LBCC 8 lane track and field. Adjacent to the track field is the LBCC baseball stadium and "Dick McClain Field." To the Northwest is the campuses farming section, including a small vegetable garden.

There is also a "Wellness Trail", tennis courts and sand volleyball courts adjacent to the track field.

=== Satellite campuses ===
Besides the main Albany Campus, Linn–Benton Community College has 2 satellite campuses: "The Corvallis Campus" with The Benton Center, and Chinook Hall, is located near the 9th Street Commercial District in Corvallis, 11 miles west of the main campus in Albany. "The Lebanon Campus" consist of The Healthcare Occupations Center and The Advanced Transportation Technology & Heavy Equipment Centers, and is located 13 miles to the east of the main campus.

Chinook Hall, on the "Corvallis Campus", opened in 2022, with the focus to offer more transfer courses that serve OSU dual-enrolled students.

=== Extension center ===
"The LBCC Horse Center" houses the Equine Management program and is located just 1.5 miles north of the main Albany Campus. These extension centers serve students in rural areas and commonly offer many evening, weekend, community education, English Language Acquisition (ELA), and GED classes.

== Student life ==
The colors of LBCC are blue, gold and white. Its mascot is “Rocky the Roadrunner”. Before the current campus in Albany was dedicated in 1974, students were called "Roadrunners" since the campus was scattered in several locations all over Albany, forcing students to commute between buildings across town.

The Takena Hall is the doorway to campus

The Student Union in Forum 121 is the main student life hub on campus.

The main campus is home to the LBCC bookstore, a coffee shop, and two eateries operated by students in the Culinary Arts program.

=== Student Leadership ===
LBCC has a very active student government (Student Leadership Council, or SLC for short). Associated Students of Linn-Benton Community College (ASLBCC). Operating within a shared governance model, the SLC acts as the official representative voice of the student body, advocating for student interests and actively participating in college decision-making.

The SLC is composed of up to 20 voting members and several non-voting members, including a President and Vice President elected through campus-wide elections. Additional members are appointed through a structured selection process outlined in the ASLBCC Constitution and SLC Bylaws.

Functions and Responsibilities The SLC manages student government fees, allocates budgets for student clubs and programming, appoints student representatives to college councils and committees, and organizes events to foster engagement. Members are also required to participate in leadership development training and maintain academic eligibility standards.

Key initiatives supported by the SLC include: Affordability Programs (e.g., food insecurity relief, textbook subsidies) Volunteer LBCC, the college’s student volunteer program Graduation Support (including cap and gown subsidies) Leadership Training and student advocacy at the institutional level.

Governance and Policy The SLC operates under a Memorandum of Understanding with LBCC administration that outlines mutual responsibilities and respect for student voice. Its policies are also guided by LBCC Board Policy 7015 and associated administrative rules.

Elections and Student Voice SLC engages students in decisions like fee increases and policy updates via referendums, ensuring transparency and student input.

=== Clubs ===
There are over two dozen active clubs led by students on the LBCC campuses. There are currently 30 inactive clubs waiting to be revived.

=== Media ===
LBCC has an award winning student-run weekly newspaper called The Commuter.

=== Art galleries ===
There are three art galleries in the main campus buildings: The South Santiam Hall Gallery, the North Santiam Hall Galleries, and the Calapooia Gallery.

=== Sporting events ===
The LBCC Activities Center is the central hub of athletics and recreation on campus. The main gymnasium has a wood floor and bleacher seating for 1,000 spectators. The Activities Center is home to all athletics staff, Health and Human Performance academic programs and faculty, classrooms, locker rooms, and administrative operations.

Adjacent to the LBCC track field is the LBCC baseball stands and "Dick McClain Field".

=== Fitness ===
The “LB Fitness Center” includes free weights, circuit training machines, and cardiovascular training equipment. The facility is used by LBCC teams for strength and conditioning training, Health and Human Performance program classes, as well as by campus students, faculty, and staff for recreational use.

Adjacent to the LBCC Activities Center is the LBCC 8 lane track and field open to the public, students and staff. There is also a “Wellness Trail”, tennis courts and sand volleyball courts adjacent to the track field.

== Athletics ==
Linn-Benton Community College athletic teams began competing in 1970. The LBCC athletic teams are known as the "Roadrunners" ("The Runners" for short) or are nicknamed "The Beaks", and compete in the Northwest Athletic Association of Community Colleges (NWAC) league, consisting of community college teams throughout the states of Oregon and Washington. The "Roadrunners" nickname stems from before the current campus in Albany was dedicated in 1974. Students were nicknamed "Roadrunners" since the campus was scattered in several locations all over Albany, forcing students to commute between buildings across town. During this period the LBCC Roadrunners began playing men's basketball in 1970-71 without a gym on campus, which left them scrambling for spaces to practice and play games.

In 2021 the athletic program celebrated the 50-year anniversary of LB athletics with a "50-for-50" celebration and recognition of former athletes, coaches, teams, supporters and memorable moments from the past five decades of Roadrunner Athletics.

=== Facilities ===
==== LBCC Activities Center ====
The LBCC Activities Center was built in 1974 and is the home of the Roadrunners men's and women's basketball teams and the women's volleyball team. The main gymnasium has a wood floor and bleacher seating for 1,000 spectators and has home and away locker rooms. It was last renovated in 2018.

==== Track and Field ====
The LB Track and Field was built in 1974. The track program produced multiple All-Americans and National Champions but was shuttered due to budget cuts in 1992. The track was last renovated in 1998 for community use and is primarily only used now for community events and local community joggers. The track is just west of the LBCC Fitness Center and the LBCC Activities Center.

==== Tennis courts ====
The LB outdoor tennis courts were built in 1974, renovated in 1996 and renovated again in 2018. They are next to the LB sand volleyball courts and sit adjacent to the LB track and the LBCC Activities Center.

==== Sand volleyball courts ====
Built in 1996 the LB sand volleyball courts sit adjacent to the LB track and the LBCC Activities Center.

== See also ==
- List of Oregon community colleges
