= Alberto Ruiz =

Spanish pole vaulter

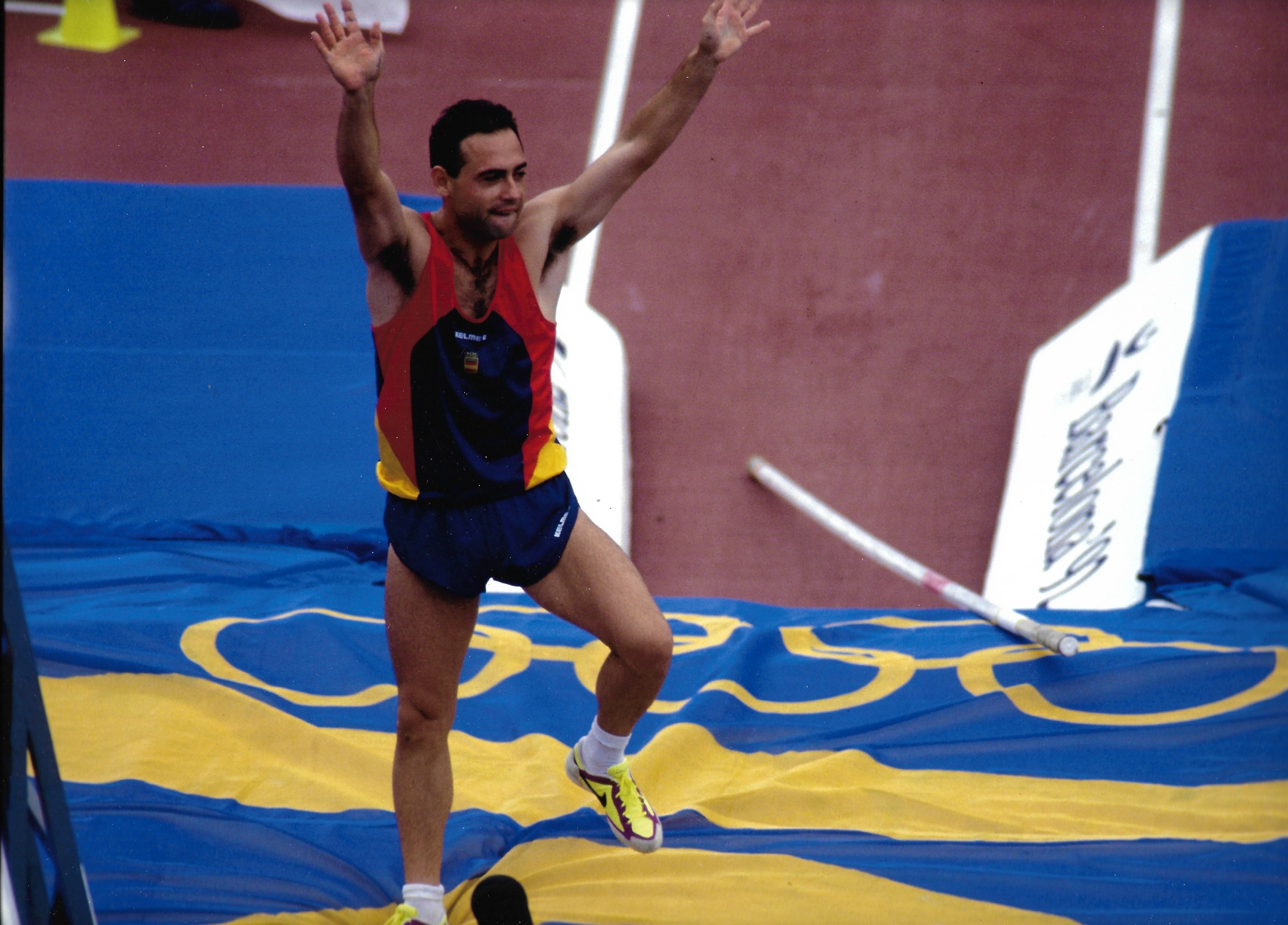
Alberto Benito

Alberto Ruiz Benito (born 22 December 1961 in Barcelona) is a retired Spanish pole vaulter.

His personal best jump was 5.61 metres, achieved in June 1986 in Manresa.

== International competitions ==
Year	Competition	Venue	Position	Notes
Representing Spain
1983	European Indoor Championships	Budapest, Hungary	10th	5.30 m
1983	World Championships	Helsinki, Finland	20th	5.10 m
1983	Mediterranean Games	Casablanca, Morocco	–	NM
1983	Ibero-American Championships	Barcelona, Spain	1st	5.20 m
1984	European Indoor Championships	Gothenburg, Sweden	8th	5.30 m
1984	Olympic Games	Los Angeles, United States	9th	5.20 m
1985	World Indoor Games	Paris, France	6th	5.50 m
1985	European Indoor Championships	Piraeus, Greece	6th	5.50 m
1986	European Indoor Championships	Madrid, Spain	10th	5.15 m
1986	Ibero-American Championships	La Habana, Cuba	1st	5.20 m
1988	Ibero-American Championships	Mexico City, Mexico	1st	5.30 m A
1989	European Indoor Championships	The Hague, Netherlands	12th	5.40 m
1989	World Indoor Championships	Budapest, Hungary	7th	5.50 m
1992	Ibero-American Championships	Seville, Spain	3rd	5.20 m
1992	Olympic Games	Barcelona, Spain	10th	5.30 m
