= Dean Starkey =

American pole vaulter (born 1967)

Personal information
- Born: March 27, 1967 (age 59) Park Ridge, Illinois, United States

Sport
- Sport: Track and field
Medal record
Representing United States
World Championships
Bronze medal – third place	1997 Athens	Pole vault
Summer Universiade
Silver medal – second place	1989 Duisburg	Pole vault

Dean Starkey (born March 27, 1967) is an American pole vaulter. His personal best is 5.92 meters, and he won a bronze medal at the 1997 World Championships. Starkey broke the record for most vaults over 19-feet by an American in 1994 when he leaped over the barrier seven times. Starkey competed for the Illinois Fighting Illini track and field team.

== Results ==
- 1999: best of 18–4.5... tied for 7th at USA Outdoors (18–0.5).
- 1998: best of 18–8.25...3rd at USA Outdoors (18–6.5)...5th in Goodwill Games (18–4.5)...ranked #4 U.S. by T&FN.
- 1997: best of 19–4.75...tied for 5th at USA Indoor (18–8.25)...2nd in USA Outdoors (19–2.25)...bronze in World Champs (19–4.75)...ranked #9 in world (#2 U.S.) by T&FN.
- 1996: best of 19–0.25...5th in USA Indoor (18–4.5)...7th in Olympic Trials (18–8.25)...ranked #6 U.S. by T&FN.
- 1995: best of 19–0.25...3rd in USA Indoor (18–8.25)...2nd in USA Outdoors (18–10.25)...8th in World Champs (18–4.5)...7th in GP Final (18–0.5)...ranked #8 in world (#2 U.S.) by T&FN.
- 1994: best of 19–5...tied for 5th in USA Indoor (18–0.5)...2nd in USA Outdoors (18–8.25)...ranked #4 in world (#1 U.S.) by T&FN.
- 1993: best of 18–8.25...2nd in USA Outdoors (18–8.25)...tied for 17th in qualifying at World Champs...ranked #8 U.S. by T&FN.
- 1992: best of 19–4.75...won USA Indoor (18–8.25)...4th in Olympic Trials (18–8.25)...ranked #8 in world (#2 U.S.) by T&FN.
- 1991: best of 19–0.75...no height at USA Outdoors...ranked #6 U.S. by T&FN.
- 1990: best of 18–8.25...tied for 3rd at USA Outdoors...ranked #7 U.S. by T&FN.
- 1989: best of 18–8...won NCAA Indoor (18–6.5)...tied for 7th at NCAA...4th in USA Outdoors...2nd in World University Games...ranked #8 U.S. by T&FN.
- 1988: best of 18–3.25...won NCAA Indoor (17–10.5)...3rd at NCAA...7th in USA Outdoors...tied for 17th in qualifying at USA Champs.
- 1987: best of 18–0.5...no height in NCAA Indoor...no height in qualifying at NCAA...no height in qualifying at USA Outdoors.
- 1986: best of 17–7.75...no height in NCAA Indoor...tied for 15th in qualifying at NCAA...tied for 3rd at USA Juniors.
- 1985: best of 16–3...2nd in Illinois HS state meet...11th at USA Juniors.
- 1984: best of 15–2.
