= 1990 European Athletics Championships – Men's pole vault =

Men's pole vault at the European Athletics Championships

These are the official results of the Men's Pole Vault event at the 1990 European Championships in Split, Yugoslavia, held at Stadion Poljud on 28 and 30 August 1990. There were a total number of nineteen participating athletes.

== Medalists ==
Gold	Radion Gataullin; Soviet Union
Silver	Grigoriy Yegorov; Soviet Union
Bronze	Hermann Fehringer; Austria

== Results ==
=== Qualification ===
Qualification standard: Qualification Performance 5.60 or at least 12 best performers advance to the final

Rank	Group	Athlete	Nationality	4.90	5.10	5.30	5.40	5.50	Result	Notes
1	A	Sergey Bubka	Soviet Union	–	–	–	–	xxo	5.50	q
2	A	Hermann Fehringer	Austria						5.40	q
3	A	Philippe Collet	France						5.30	q
4	A	Ferenc Salbert	France						5.30	q
5	A	Petri Peltoniemi	Finland						5.30	q
6	A	Marco Andreini	Italy						5.10	
7	A	Ruhan Işım	Turkey						4.90	
	A	Peter Widén	Sweden						NM	
	A	Sazan Fisheku	Albania						NM	
	A	Nikolay Nikolov	Bulgaria						NM	
1	B	Grigoriy Yegorov	Soviet Union						5.40	q
2	B	Radion Gataullin	Soviet Union	–	–	–	xxo		5.40	q
3	B	Galin Nikov	Bulgaria						5.30	q
4	B	Thierry Vigneron	France						5.30	q
5	B	Javier García	Spain						5.30	q
6	B	Jani Lehtonen	Finland						5.30	q
7	B	István Bagyula	Hungary						5.30	q
8	B	Mike Edwards	Great Britain						5.10	
	B	Bernhard Zintl	West Germany						NM	

=== Final ===
Rank	Name	Nationality	5.20	5.40	5.60	5.70	5.75	5.80	5.85	5.90	6.08	Result	Notes
1st place, gold medalist(s)	Radion Gataullin	Soviet Union				xo			o	x-	xx	5.85	=CR
2nd place, silver medalist(s)	Grigoriy Yegorov	Soviet Union			o		xo		x–	xx		5.75	
3rd place, bronze medalist(s)	Hermann Fehringer	Austria										5.75	
4	Philippe Collet	France				o	–	xr				5.70	
5	Javier García	Spain				xo						5.70	
6	Sergey Bubka	Soviet Union	–	–	–	xxo	–	xxx				5.70	
7	Ferenc Salbert	France		o	o	xxx						5.60	
8	Petri Peltoniemi	Finland										5.40	
9	Galin Nikov	Bulgaria										5.40	
10	István Bagyula	Hungary										5.20	
	Thierry Vigneron	France										NM	
	Jani Lehtonen	Finland										NM	

== Participation ==
According to an unofficial count, 19 athletes from 13 countries participated in the event.

- Albania (1)
- Austria (1)
- Bulgaria (2)
- Finland (2)
- France (3)
- Hungary (1)
- Italy (1)
- Soviet Union (3)
- Spain (1)
- Sweden (1)
- Turkey (1)
- United Kingdom (1)
- West Germany (1)

== See also ==
- 1988 Men's Olympic Pole Vault (Seoul)
- 1991 Men's World Championships Pole Vault (Tokyo)
- 1992 Men's Olympic Pole Vault (Barcelona)
- 1994 Men's European Championships Pole Vault (Helsinki)
