= Kory Tarpenning =

American pole vaulter (born 1962)

Personal information
- Nationality: American
- Born: 27 February 1962 (age 64) Portland, Oregon, USA
- Height: 80 cm (2 ft 7 in)
- Weight: 75 kg (165 lb)

Sport
- Sport: Athletics
- Event: pole vault
- Club: Pacific Coast Club / Nike, Beaverton

Kory Merrill Tarpenning (born February 27, 1962) is an American retired pole vaulter best known for finishing fourth at the 1992 Summer Olympics in Barcelona, having previously competed at the 1988 Summer Olympics in Seoul.

== Biography ==
Tarpenning competed for Linn-Benton Community College and for the Oregon Ducks track and field team in the NCAA and was an All-American in 1984.

Tarpenning won the British AAA Championships title in the pole vault event at the 1985 AAA Championships.

His personal best vault was 5.89 m (19 ft 3 3/4 in), achieved in July 1988 in Indianapolis.

Aside from his Olympic appearances, he came fourth at both the 1991 IAAF World Indoor Championships and 1994 IAAF Grand Prix Final. He also competed at the 1992 IAAF World Cup, but failed to register a valid mark. He was a four time national champion in his discipline, having won at the USA Outdoor Track and Field Championships in 1988 and 1989 and the USA Indoor Track and Field Championships in 1991 and 1994. He also came second at the 1994 Prefontaine Classic, losing out to Sergey Bubka. Tarpenning tested positive for anabolic steroid use in 1997 and was suspended for two years.

After his athletic career, he moved to Monaco and was involved in the opening of the first Starbucks coffee house in the principality. In January 2022, he was sentenced to three months in federal prison for tax fraud.
