= Hermann Fehringer =

Austrian pole vaulter

Medal record

Men's athletics

Representing Austria

European Championships
| Bronze medal – third place | 1990 Split | Pole vault |

Hermann Fehringer (born 8 December 1962 in Amstetten) is a former pole vaulter from Austria.

His personal best was 5.77 metres, achieved in July 1991 in Linz. This is the current Austrian record.

== International competitions ==
| Year | Competition | Venue | Position | Notes |
Representing Austria
| 1983 | European Indoor Championships | Budapest, Hungary | 16th | 5.20 m |
| 1985 | World Indoor Games | Paris, France | 15th | 5.00 m |
| 1985 | European Indoor Championships | Piraeus, Greece | 9th | 5.40 m |
| 1986 | European Championships | Stuttgart, West Germany | 14th (q) | 5.30 m |
| 1987 | European Indoor Championships | Liévin, France | 10th | 5.40 m |
| 1987 | World Indoor Championships | Indianapolis, United States | 13th | 5.30 m |
| 1988 | European Indoor Championships | Budapest, Hungary | 7th | 5.50 m |
| 1988 | Olympic Games | Seoul, South Korea | 13th | 5.40 m |
| 1989 | European Indoor Championships | The Hague, Netherlands | 8th | 5.40 m |
| 1989 | World Indoor Championships | Budapest, Hungary | – | NM |
| 1990 | European Indoor Championships | Glasgow, United Kingdom | 3rd | 5.70 m |
| 1990 | European Championships | Split, Yugoslavia | 3rd | 5.75 m |
| 1991 | World Indoor Championships | Seville, Spain | 5th | 5.70 m |
| 1991 | World Championships | Tokyo, Japan | 7th | 5.60 m |
| 1992 | European Indoor Championships | Genoa, Italy | 7th | 5.60 m |
