= Joe Dial =

American pole vualter

Medal record

Men's athletics

Representing the United States

World Indoor Championships
Bronze medal – third place	1989 Budapest	Pole vault

Joe Dial (born October 26, 1962, in Marlow, Oklahoma) is a retired American pole vaulter, best known for winning the bronze medal at the 1989 World Indoor Championships in Budapest. His personal best was 5.96 metres, achieved in June 1987 in Norman, Oklahoma.

While competing for Marlow High School, he was Track and Field News "High School Athlete of the Year" in 1981.

Since retiring from the sport, Dial has turned to coaching. He was the head coach of the men's and women's track and cross country programs at Oral Roberts University in Tulsa, Oklahoma from 1993-2022. During his tenure at ORU, he coached 50 All-Americans and turned ORU into a powerhouse in the Mid-Continent Conference.

In spite of his coaching a rival school, Dial is still a popular alum of Oklahoma State University, and was named to the OSU Hall of Fame in 2002. He and his wife Shawna, an assistant coach at ORU, have three sons.

In July 2022, Dial was hired as head coach of Jenks High School's boys' cross country, and boys' track and field.

Awards
Preceded by Steve Stubblefield	Track & Field News High School Boys Athlete of the Year; 1981	Succeeded by Darrell Robinson
