= Aleksandrs Obižajevs =

Latvian pole vaulter

Aleksandrs Obižajevs (born 16 September 1959) is a retired pole vaulter who represented the USSR and later Latvia. His personal best jump was 5.80 metres, achieved in July 1987 in Bryansk. His result of 5.74 metres in 1983 placed him second on the top performers list during the indoor season that year, behind American Billy Olson.

He competed for Latvia at the 1992 Summer Olympics and the 1996 Summer Olympics.

== Achievements ==
Year	Competition	Venue	Position	Notes
1983	European Indoor Championships	Budapest, Hungary	2nd	
1987	World Championships	Rome, Italy	9th	
