= Marco Andreini =

Italian pole vaulter (born 1961)

Luigi Benedetti
Personal information
- Nationality: Italian
- Born: October 8, 1961 (age 64) Italy

Sport
- Country: Italy
- Sport: Athletics
- Event: Pole vault
- Club: G.S. Fiamme Gialle

Achievements and titles
- Personal best: Pole vault: 5.68 m (1990)
Medal record
Mediterranean Games
Bronze medal – third place	1991 Athens	Pole vault

Marco Andreini (born 8 October 1961) is an Italian retired pole vaulter.

== Biography ==
He won the bronze medal at the 1991 Mediterranean Games, ten centimetres behind Philippe d'Encausse and Jean-Marc Tailhardat. He also finished sixteenth at the 1977 European Indoor Championships, and competed at the 1990 European Championships without reaching the final.

He became Italian champion in 1988 and 1989. He succeeded Gianni Stecchi as champion and was succeeded by Gianni Iapichino. He also became Italian indoor champion in 1985 and 1986. His personal best jump was 5.68 metres, achieved in September 1990 in Siderno.

== Masters athletics ==
Its measure of 4.90 m obtained on 10 June 2001 at age 41 is the 14th all-time performance in the category M45.

== Achievements ==
Year	Competition	Venue	Position	Event	Notes
Representing Italy
1990	European Championships	Split, Yugoslavia	13th (q)	Pole vault	5.10 m

== National titles ==
MArco Andreini has won four times the individual national championship.

- 2 wins in Pole vault (1988, 1989)
- 2 wins in Pole vault indoor (1985, 1986)

== See also ==
- Italian all-time top lists - Pole vault
