= Philippe d'Encausse =

French pole vaulter (born 1967)

Personal information
- Born: 24 March 1967 (age 59) Clermont-Ferrand, France

Sport
- Sport: Track and field
Medal record
Representing France
Mediterranean Games
Gold medal – first place	1991 Athens	Pole vault

Philippe d'Encausse (French pronunciation: [filip dɑ̃kos]; born 24 March 1967) is a retired French pole vaulter. He competed in two consecutive Olympic Games, representing France.

Philippe's father, Hervé d'Encausse, was a European record holder and 1968 Olympic finalist in pole vault.

He has previously coached Renaud Lavillenie and Marion Fiack.

== Achievements ==
Year	Competition	Venue	Position	Event	Notes
Representing France
1988	Olympic Games	Seoul, South Korea	8th	Pole vault	5.60 m
1989	Jeux de la Francophonie	Casablanca, Morocco	3rd	Pole vault	5.35 m
1991	Mediterranean Games	Athens, Greece	1st	Pole vault	5.60m CR
1992	Olympic Games	Barcelona, Spain	15th(q)	Pole vault	5.50 m
