= Ferenc Salbert =

French pole vaulter

Ferenc Salbert (born 5 August 1960) is a retired pole vaulter who represented France after switching from Hungary.

== Biography ==
His indoor result of 5.90 metres in 1987 placed him second on the top performers list that year, behind Sergey Bubka. Salbert was elected vice president of the Hungarian Athletic Federation on 10 November 2002.

== Achievements ==
Year	Competition	Venue	Position	Notes
Representing Hungary
1982	European Championships	Athens, Greece	15th (q)	5.25 m
Representing France
1987	European Indoor Championships	Liévin, France	2nd	5.85 m
1987	World Indoor Championships	Indianapolis, United States	4th	5.80 m
1987	World Championships	Rome, Italy	10th	5.50 m
1989	Jeux de la Francophonie	Casablanca, Morocco	1st	5.65 m
1990	European Championships	Split, Yugoslavia	7th	5.60 m
1991	World Indoor Championships	Seville, Spain	3rd	5.70 m

== See also ==
- French all-time top lists - Pole vault
