= Stanimir Penchev =

Bulgarian pole vaulter

Personal information
- Born: 19 February 1959 (age 67)

Sport
- Sport: Track and field

Stanimir Penchev (Bulgarian: Станимир Пенчев; born 19 February 1959) is a retired Bulgarian pole vaulter.

He finished ninth at the 1987 European Indoor Championships.

His personal best jump was 5.70 metres, achieved in August 1986 in Sofia. This ranks him fourth among Bulgarian pole vaulters, behind Spas Bukhalov, Atanas Tarev, Nikolay Nikolov, and joint with Iliyan Efremov and Delko Lesev.
