= Asko Peltoniemi =

Finnish pole vaulter

Asko Peltoniemi (born 7 February 1963 in Ikaalinen) is a retired Finnish pole vaulter, now is Fitness Coach from FC Haka.

== Achievements ==
Year	Competition	Venue	Position	Notes
1987	World Indoor Championships	Indianapolis, United States	13th	
	European Indoor Championships	Liévin, France	8th	
1988	Olympic Games	Seoul, South Korea	9th	
1989	World Indoor Championships	Budapest, Hungary	9th	
1990	European Indoor Championships	Glasgow, Scotland	9th	
1991	World Indoor Championships	Seville, Spain	13th	
1992	Olympic Games	Barcelona, Spain	6th	
