= Atanas Tarev =

Bulgarian pole vaulter

Medal record

Men's athletics

Representing Bulgaria

European Championships
Bronze medal – third place	1982 Athens	Pole vault

Atanas Kirilov Tarev (Bulgarian: Атанас Кирилов Търев; born 31 January 1958 in Plovdiv Province) is a retired pole vaulter from Bulgaria. He won a bronze medal at the inaugural World Championships in 1983, and won the European Indoor Championships in 1986. The same year he jumped 5.80 metres, a personal best.

== International competitions ==
Year	Competition	Venue	Position	Notes
Representing Bulgaria
1977	European Junior Championships	Donetsk, Soviet Union	3rd	5.10 m
1979	European Indoor Championships	Vienna, Austria	10th	5.20 m
1980	European Indoor Championships	Sindelfingen, West Germany	11th	5.40 m
1980	Olympic Games	Moscow, Soviet Union	13th (q)	5.25 m
1981	European Indoor Championships	Grenoble, France	8th	5.50 m
1982	European Indoor Championships	Milan, Italy	5th	5.55 m
1982	European Championships	Athens, Greece	3rd	5.60 m
1983	European Indoor Championships	Budapest, Hungary	4th	5.55 m
1983	World Championships	Helsinki, Finland	3rd	5.60 m
1984	Friendship Games	Moscow, Soviet Union	7th	5.40 m
1985	European Indoor Championships	Piraeus, Greece	3rd	5.60 m
1986	European Indoor Championships	Madrid, Spain	1st	5.70 m
1986	European Championships	Stuttgart, West Germany	4th	5.70 m
1987	European Indoor Championships	Liévin, France	7th	5.60 m
1987	World Indoor Championships	Indianapolis, United States	6th	5.70 m
1987	World Championships	Rome, Italy	8th	5.60 m
1988	European Indoor Championships	Budapest, Hungary	3rd	5.70 m
1988	Olympic Games	Seoul, South Korea	–	NM
1989	European Indoor Championships	The Hague, Netherlands	7th	5.50 m
1989	World Indoor Championships	Budapest, Hungary	11th	5.40 m
