= Radion Gataullin =

Soviet and Russian pole vaulter

Personal information
- Native name: Радион Аксанович Гатауллин
- Full name: Radion Aksanovich Gataullin
- Nationality: Russian
- Born: 23 November 1965 (age 60) Tashkent, Uzbek SSR, Soviet Union
- Height: 1.89 m (6 ft 2 in)
- Weight: 79 kg (174 lb)

Sport
- Country: Soviet Union; Russia
- Sport: Athletics
- Event: Pole vault

Achievements and titles
- Personal bests: 6.00 m (outdoors 1989); 6.02 m (indoors 1989)
Medal record
Men's athletics
Representing Soviet Union
Olympic Games
Silver medal – second place	1988 Seoul	Pole vault
World Championships
Bronze medal – third place	1987 Rome	Pole vault
World Indoor Championships
Gold medal – first place	1989 Budapest	Pole vault
European Championships
Gold medal – first place	1990 Split	Pole vault
Summer Universiade
Gold medal – first place	1985 Kobe	Pole vault
Silver medal – second place	1987 Zagreb	Pole vault
Representing Russia
World Indoor Championships
Gold medal – first place	1993 Toronto	Pole vault
European Championships
Gold medal – first place	1994 Helsinki	Pole vault

Radion Aksanovich Gataullin (Russian: Радио́н Аксанович Гатау́ллин; born 23 November 1965) is a retired pole vaulter who represented the Soviet Union and later Russia. He is the 1988 Olympic silver medallist, the 1987 World bronze medallist, a two-time European champion (1990/94) and a two-time World Indoor champion (1989/93). He is also a former world indoor record holder with clearances of 6.00m and 6.02m in 1989.

== Career ==
Born in Tashkent, Uzbek SSR, Soviet Union), Gautaullin trained at Burevestnik in Tashkent and represented the USSR and later Russia. He is of Tatar origin.

Gataullin was the second vaulter to break the 6.00 metre barrier after Sergey Bubka, and was the first vaulter to clear 6.00 metres indoors, first achieving it on 22 January 1989 in Leningrad, before improving his personal best jumps to 6.02 metres (indoors) on 4 February 1989 in Gomel and 6.00 metres (outdoors) on 16 September 1989 in Tokyo. He would also achieve 6.00 metre clearances twice more indoors (both February 1993) and twice more outdoors in June 1993 and August 1994.

He later became the national pole vault coach of Russia. His younger brother Ruslan Gataullin has represented Russia in the long jump. He is married to Tatyana Reshetnikova, an Olympic hurdler for Russia. Their daughter Aksana Gataullina is the current U20 European champion in pole vault.

== Achievements ==
Year	Competition	Venue	Position	Notes
Representing the Soviet Union
1985	Universiade	Kobe, Japan	1st	5.75 m =CR
1986	Goodwill Games	Moscow, Soviet Union	2nd	5.80 m
1986	European Championships	Stuttgart, Germany	NH (q)	—
1987	Universiade	Zagreb, Yugoslavia	2nd	5.60 m
1987	World Championships	Rome, Italy	3rd	5.80 m
1988	European Indoor Championships	Budapest, Hungary	1st	5.75 m
1988	Olympic Games	Seoul, South Korea	2nd	5.85 m
1989	World Indoor Championships	Budapest, Hungary	1st	5.85 m =CR
1990	European Indoor Championships	Glasgow, Scotland	1st	5.80 m
1990	Goodwill Games	Seattle, United States	1st	5.92 m
1990	European Championships	Split, Yugoslavia	1st	5.85 m =CR
1991	World Championships	Tokyo, Japan	4th	5.85 m
Representing Russia
1993	World Indoor Championships	Toronto, Canada	1st	5.90 m
1994	European Championships	Helsinki, Finland	1st	6.00 m =PB, CR
Gataullin no-heighted in the qualifying round at the 1986 European Championships

== See also ==
- 6 metres club

Sporting positions
Preceded by (Soviet Union) Sergey Bubka	Men's Pole Vault Best Year Performance; 1989–1990	Succeeded by (Soviet Union) Sergey Bubka
