= Nikolay Nikolov (pole vaulter) =

Bulgarian pole vaulter

Personal information
- Born: 15 October 1964 (age 61) Beloslav, Bulgaria

Sport
- Sport: Track and field
Medal record
Representing Bulgaria
European Indoor Championships
Silver medal – second place	1988 Budapest	Pole vault

Nikolay Nikolov (Bulgarian: Николай Николов; born 15 October 1964) is a retired Bulgarian pole vaulter. He is best known for winning a silver medal at the 1988 European Indoor Championships.

His personal best jump was 5.72 metres, achieved in July 1991 in Sofia. This ranks him third among Bulgarian pole vaulters, only behind Spas Bukhalov and Atanas Tarev.

== Achievements ==
Year	Competition	Venue	Position	Notes
Representing Bulgaria
1986	Balkan Games	Ljubljana, Yugoslavia	1st	5.60 m
1986	European Championships	Stuttgart, West Germany	9th	5.35 m
1987	World Indoor Championships	Indianapolis, United States	7th	5.60 m
1987	European Indoor Championships	Liévin, France	6th	5.60 m
1987	World Championships	Rome, Italy	5th	5.70 m
1988	European Indoor Championships	Budapest, Hungary	2nd	5.70 m
1989	Balkan Games	Serres, Greece	1st	5.50 m
1990	European Indoor Championships	Glasgow, Scotland	6th	5.60 m
1990	European Championships	Split, Yugoslavia	—	NH
1992	European Indoor Championships	Genoa, Italy	8th	5.60 m
