= 1981 European Athletics Indoor Championships – Men's pole vault =

The men's pole vault event at the 1981 European Athletics Indoor Championships was held on 22 February.

== Results ==
Rank	Name	Nationality	5.00	5.15	5.25	5.35	5.45	5.50	5.55	5.60	5.65	5.70	5.75	Result	Notes
1st place, gold medalist(s)	Thierry Vigneron	France	−	−	−	xo	−	o	−	o	−	o	xxx	5.70	=WR, CR
2nd place, silver medalist(s)	Aleksandr Krupskiy	Soviet Union	−	−	o	−	o	−	o	o	o	x−	xx	5.65	
3rd place, bronze medalist(s)	Jean-Michel Bellot	France	−	−	−	o	−	xo	−	−	xo	xxx		5.65	
4	Patrick Desruelles	Belgium	−	−	o	−	o	−	o	o	xxx			5.60	
5	Mariusz Klimczyk	Poland	−	−	−	xxo	−	xo	o	−	xxx			5.55	
6	Philippe Houvion	France	−	−	o	−	o	−	xo	−	xxx			5.55	
7	Vladimir Polyakov	Soviet Union	−	−	o	−	o	−	xo	−	xxx			5.55	
8	Atanas Tarev	Bulgaria	−	−	o	−	xxo	o	x−	x−	x			5.50	
9	Brian Hooper	Great Britain	o	−	o	xo	xxo	xxx						5.45	
10	Aleksandr Chernyayev	Soviet Union	−	o	−	o	−	xxx						5.35	
11	Günther Lohre	West Germany	−	−	o	xo	xxx							5.35	
12	Rauli Pudas	Finland	−	−	xo	xo	xxx							5.35	
13	Ivo Yanchev	Bulgaria	−	o	xo	xo	−	xr						5.35	
14	Miro Zalar	Sweden	−	−	xo	xxo	xx−	x						5.35	
15	Tapani Haapakoski	Finland	−	o	o	xxx								5.25	
16	Roger Oriol	Spain	−	xxo	o	xxx								5.25	
17	Petr Habel	Czechoslovakia	xo	o	xxx									5.15	
	Ilkka Pekkala	Finland	xxx											NM	
	Keith Stock	Great Britain	−	xxx										NM	
	Bernd Müller	West Germany	xxx											NM	
	Zbigniew Matyka	Poland	xxx											NM	
