= 1979 European Athletics Indoor Championships – Men's pole vault =

The men's pole vault event at the 1979 European Athletics Indoor Championships was held on 25 February in Vienna.

== Results ==
Rank	Name	Nationality	Result	Notes
1st place, gold medalist(s)	Władysław Kozakiewicz	Poland	5.58	AR, CR
2nd place, silver medalist(s)	Konstantin Volkov	Soviet Union	5.45	
3rd place, bronze medalist(s)	Vladimir Trofimenko	Soviet Union	5.45	
4	Günther Lohre	West Germany	5.40	
5	Wojciech Buciarski	Poland	5.40	
6	Mariusz Klimczyk	Poland	5.40	
7	Philippe Houvion	France	5.40	
8	Brian Hooper	Great Britain	5.30	
9	Rauli Pudas	Finland	5.20	
10	Atanas Tarev	Bulgaria	5.20	
11	Roger Oriol	Spain	5.20	
12	Kimmo Pallonen	Finland	5.20	
13	Domenico D'Alisera	Italy	5.10	
	Patrick Abada	France	NM	
	Tapani Haapakoski	Finland	NM	
	Thierry Vigneron	France	NM	
	Yuriy Prokhorenko	Soviet Union	NM	
