= Athletics at the 1979 Summer Universiade – Men's pole vault =

The men's pole vault event at the 1979 Summer Universiade was held at the Estadio Olimpico Universitario in Mexico City on 8 and 13 September 1979.

== Medalists ==
Gold	Silver	Bronze
Władysław Kozakiewicz; Poland	Philippe Houvion; France	Patrick Abada; France

== Results ==
=== Qualification ===
Qualification height: 5.00 m

Rank	Group	Athlete	Nationality	Result	Notes
?	?	Harold Heer	Canada	5.00	Q
?	?	Dave Parker	Canada	5.00	Q
?	?	Liang Weigiang	China	5.00	Q
?	?	Veijo Vannesluoma	Finland	5.00	Q
?	?	Patrick Abada	France	5.00	Q
?	?	Philippe Houvion	France	5.00	Q
?	?	Elias Sakeliaridis	Greece	5.00	Q
?	?	Dimitrios Kyteas	Greece	5.00	Q
?	?	Władysław Kozakiewicz	Poland	5.00	Q
?	?	Vladimir Trofimenko	Soviet Union	5.00	Q
?	?	Konstantin Volkov	Soviet Union	5.00	Q
?	?	Roger Oriol	Spain	5.00	Q
?	?	Julio Rifaterra	Spain	5.00	Q
?	?	Roger Thorstensson	Sweden	5.00	Q
?	?	Billy Olson	United States	5.00	Q
?	?	Günther Lohre	West Germany	5.00	Q
?	?	Paul Pilla	United States	5.00	Q
17	?	József Novobáczky	Hungary	4.80	
17	?	Enrique Goytizolo	Peru	4.40	

=== Final ===
Rank	Athlete	Nationality	5.00	5.20	5.35	5.40	5.50	5.55	5.60	Result	Notes
1st place, gold medalist(s)	Władysław Kozakiewicz	Poland								5.60	
2nd place, silver medalist(s)	Philippe Houvion	France								5.60	
3rd place, bronze medalist(s)	Patrick Abada	France								5.55	
4	Günther Lohre	West Germany								5.55	
5	Vladimir Trofimenko	Soviet Union								5.50	
6	Konstantin Volkov	Soviet Union								5.40	
7	Veijo Vannesluoma	Finland								5.35	
8	Roger Oriol	Spain	xo	o	xxo	xxx				5.35	=NR
9	Elias Sakeliaridis	Greece								5.15	
10	Harold Heer	Canada								5.00	
11	Dimitrios Kyteas	Greece								5.00	
12	Dave Parker	Canada								4.80	
	Roger Thorstensson	Sweden								NM	
	Paul Pilla	United States								NM	
	Liang Weigiang	China								DNS	
	Julio Rifaterra	Spain								DNS	
