= 1977 European Athletics Indoor Championships – Men's pole vault =

The men's pole vault event at the 1977 European Athletics Indoor Championships was held on 12 March in San Sebastián.

== Results ==
Rank	Name	Nationality	4.40	5.00	5.10	5.20	5.30	5.35	5.40	5.45	5.51	5.60	Result	Notes
1st place, gold medalist(s)	Władysław Kozakiewicz	Poland	–	–	–	o	–	xo	–	xo	o	xxx	5.51	CR
2nd place, silver medalist(s)	Antti Kalliomäki	Finland	–	–	xo	–	o	–	xxx				5.31	
3rd place, bronze medalist(s)	Mariusz Klimczyk	Poland	–	o	–	o	xxx						5.20	
4	Leszek Hołownia	Poland	o	xo	o	xxx							5.10	
5	Felix Böhni	Switzerland	o	xxo	o	xxx							5.10	
6	Roger Oriol	Spain	o	xxo	xxo	xxx							5.10	
7	Jacques Desbois	France	–	o	–	xxx							5.00	
8	Tapani Haapakoski	Finland	–	xxo	–	xxx							5.00	
	Jean-Michel Bellot	France											NM	
	Viktor Spasov	Soviet Union											NM	
	Philippe Houvion	France											NM	
