= 1978 European Athletics Championships – Men's pole vault =

Men's pole vault at the European Athletics Championships

The men's pole vault at the 1978 European Athletics Championships was held in Prague, then Czechoslovakia, at Stadion Evžena Rošického on 30 August and 1 September 1978.

== Medalists ==
| Gold | Vladimir Trofimenko; Soviet Union |
| Silver | Antti Kalliomäki; Finland |
| Bronze | Rauli Pudas; Finland |

== Results ==
=== Final ===
1 September

| Rank | Name | Nationality | Result | Notes |
|---|---|---|---|---|
| 1st place, gold medalist(s) | Vladimir Trofimenko | Soviet Union | 5.55 | CR |
| 2nd place, silver medalist(s) | Antti Kalliomäki | Finland | 5.50 | |
| 3rd place, bronze medalist(s) | Rauli Pudas | Finland | 5.45 | |
| 4 | Władysław Kozakiewicz | Poland | 5.45 | |
| 5 | Yevgeniy Tananyka | Soviet Union | 5.40 | |
| 6 | Philippe Houvion | France | 5.40 | |
| 7 | François Tracanelli | France | 5.30 | |
| 7 | Brian Hooper | Great Britain | 5.30 | |
| 9 | Patrick Abada | France | 5.30 | |
| 10 | Tapani Haapakoski | Finland | 5.30 | |
| 11 | Günther Lohre | West Germany | 5.20 | |
| | Mariusz Klimczyk | Poland | NH | |
| | Roger Oriol | Spain | DNS | |

=== Qualification ===
30 August

| Rank | Name | Nationality | Result | Notes |
|---|---|---|---|---|
| | Władysław Kozakiewicz | Poland | 5.25 | Q |
| | Günther Lohre | West Germany | 5.25 | Q |
| | Mariusz Klimczyk | Poland | 5.25 | Q |
| | Yevgeniy Tananyka | Soviet Union | 5.15 | q |
| | Philippe Houvion | France | 5.15 | q |
| | Rauli Pudas | Finland | 5.15 | q |
| | François Tracanelli | France | 5.15 | q |
| | Vladimir Trofimenko | Soviet Union | 5.15 | q |
| | Patrick Abada | France | 5.15 | q |
| | Brian Hooper | Great Britain | 5.15 | q |
| | Roger Oriol | Spain | 5.15 | q |
| | Tapani Haapakoski | Finland | 5.15 | q |
| | Antti Kalliomäki | Finland | 5.15 | q |
| | Domenico D'Alisera | Italy | 4.90 | |
| | Roman Zrun | Czechoslovakia | 4.90 | |
| | Elias Sakellariadis | Greece | 4.90 | |
| | Peter Jensen | Denmark | 4.90 | |
| | Reinhard Lechner | Austria | 4.90 | |
| | Tadeusz Ślusarski | Poland | NH | |
| | Jiří Lesák | Czechoslovakia | NH | |
| | Antonín Hadinger | Czechoslovakia | NH | |
| | Keith Stock | Great Britain | NH | |
| | Patrick Desruelles | Belgium | NH | |

== Participation ==
According to an unofficial count, 23 athletes from 13 countries participated in the event.

- Austria (1)
- Belgium (1)
- Czechoslovakia (3)
- Denmark (1)
- Finland (3)
- France (3)
- Greece (1)
- Italy (1)
- Poland (3)
- Soviet Union (2)
- Spain (1)
- Great Britain (2)
- West Germany (1)
