= Athletics at the 1983 Summer Universiade – Men's pole vault =

The men's pole vault event at the 1983 Summer Universiade was held at the Commonwealth Stadium in Edmonton, Canada on 7 and 8 July 1983.

== Medalists ==
Gold	Silver	Bronze
Konstantin Volkov; Soviet Union	Thierry Vigneron; France	Jeff Ward; United States

== Results ==
=== Qualification ===
Rank	Athlete	Nationality	Result	Notes
?	Thierry Vigneron	France	5.10	
?	Philippe Collet	France	5.10	
?	Daniel Aebischer	Switzerland	5.10	
?	Daniel Forter	Switzerland	5.10	
?	Konstantin Volkov	Soviet Union	5.10	
?	Vladimir Polyakov	Soviet Union	5.10	
?	Victor Drechsel	Italy	5.10	
?	Teruhisa Kamiya	Japan	5.10	
?	Jeff Buckingham	United States	5.10	
?	Anton Paskalev	Bulgaria	5.10	
?	Jeff Ward	United States	5.10	
?	Peter Volmer	West Germany	5.10	
?	Stanimir Penchev	Bulgaria	5.10	
?	Gerald Heinrich	West Germany	5.10	
15	George Barber	Canada	5.00	

=== Final ===
Rank	Athlete	Nationality	Result	Notes
1st place, gold medalist(s)	Konstantin Volkov	Soviet Union	5.65	
2nd place, silver medalist(s)	Thierry Vigneron	France	5.60	
3rd place, bronze medalist(s)	Jeff Ward	United States	5.50	
4	Vladimir Polyakov	Soviet Union	5.40	
5	Jeff Buckingham	United States	5.40	
6	Daniel Aebischer	Switzerland	5.20	
6	Philippe Collet	France	5.20	
6	Stanimir Penchev	Bulgaria	5.20	
6	Peter Volmer	West Germany	5.20	
6	Anton Paskalev	Bulgaria	5.20	
6	Gerald Heinrich	West Germany	5.20	
12	Victor Drechsel	Italy	5.20	
13	Teruhisa Kamiya	Japan	5.00	
	Daniel Forter	Switzerland	NM	
