= 1978 European Athletics Indoor Championships – Men's pole vault =

The men's pole vault event at the 1978 European Athletics Indoor Championships was held on 11 March in Milan.

== Results ==
| Rank | Name | Nationality | Result | Notes |
|---|---|---|---|---|
| 1st place, gold medalist(s) | Tadeusz Ślusarski | Poland | 5.45 | |
| 2nd place, silver medalist(s) | Vladimir Trofimenko | Soviet Union | 5.40 | |
| 3rd place, bronze medalist(s) | Vladimir Sergiyenko | Soviet Union | 5.40 | |
| 4 | Yuriy Prokhorenko | Soviet Union | 5.40 | |
| 5 | Władysław Kozakiewicz | Poland | 5.40 | |
| 6 | Günther Lohre | West Germany | 5.30 | |
| 7 | François Tracanelli | France | 5.20 | |
| 8 | Philippe Houvion | France | 5.20 | |
| 9 | Kjell Isaksson | Sweden | 5.00 | |
| 10 | Leszek Hołownia | Poland | 5.00 | |
| 11 | Ivo Yanchev | Bulgaria | 5.00 | |
| 12 | Rauli Pudas | Finland | 5.00 | |
| 13 | Brian Hooper | Great Britain | 5.00 | |
| | Tapani Haapakoski | Finland | NM | |
| | Ilias Sakelladiris | Greece | NM | |
| | Felix Böhni | Switzerland | NM | |
