= 1980 European Athletics Indoor Championships – Men's pole vault =

The men's pole vault event at the 1980 European Athletics Indoor Championships was held on 1 March in Sindelfingen.

== Results ==
Rank	Name	Nationality	Result	Notes
1st place, gold medalist(s)	Konstantin Volkov	Soviet Union	5.60	CR
2nd place, silver medalist(s)	Vladimir Polyakov	Soviet Union	5.60	CR
3rd place, bronze medalist(s)	Patrick Abada	France	5.55	
4	Władysław Kozakiewicz	Poland	5.50	
5	Sergey Kulibaba	Soviet Union	5.50	
6	Antti Kalliomäki	Finland	5.50	
7	Anton Paskalev	Bulgaria	5.50	
8	Mariusz Klimczyk	Poland	5.40	
9	Thierry Vigneron	France	5.40	
10	Patrick Desruelles	Belgium	5.40	
11	Atanas Tarev	Bulgaria	5.40	
12	Miro Zalar	Sweden	5.30	
13	Günther Lohre	West Germany	5.30	
14	Ferenc Salbert	Hungary	5.20	
15	Gerald Heinrich	West Germany	5.10	
16	Ernö Makó	Hungary	4.90	
