= Athletics at the 1981 Summer Universiade – Men's pole vault =

The men's pole vault event at the 1981 Summer Universiade was held at the Stadionul Naţional in Bucharest on 22 and 23 July 1981.

== Medalists ==
Gold	Silver	Bronze
Konstantin Volkov; Soviet Union	Vladimir Polyakov; Soviet Union	Philippe Houvion; France

== Results ==
=== Qualification ===
Qualifying mark: 5.00 m

Rank	Athlete	Nationality	Result	Notes
?	Philippe Houvion	France	5.00	Q
?	Thierry Vigneron	France	5.00	Q
?	Roger Oriol	Spain	5.00	Q
?	Viktor Drechsel	Italy	5.00	Q
?	Mauro Barrella	Italy	5.00	Q
?	Konstantin Volkov	Soviet Union	5.00	Q
?	Vladimir Polyakov	Soviet Union	5.00	Q
?	Jürgen Winkler	West Germany	5.00	Q
?	Anton Paskalev	Bulgaria	5.00	Q
?	Brad Pursley	United States	5.00	Q
?	Rubén Camino	Cuba	5.00	Q
?	Dimitrios Kyteas	Greece	5.00	Q
?	Marian Kolasa	Poland	5.00	Q
?	Stanimir Penchev	Bulgaria	5.00	Q
?	Gerald Heinrich	East Germany	5.00	Q
?	Tomomi Takahashi	Japan	5.00	Q
?	Timo Kuusisto	Finland	5.00	Q
?	Ernö Makó	Hungary	5.00	Q
?	Ilkka Pekkala	Finland	5.00	Q

=== Final ===
Rank	Athlete	Nationality	Result	Notes
1st place, gold medalist(s)	Konstantin Volkov	Soviet Union	5.75	UR
2nd place, silver medalist(s)	Vladimir Polyakov	Soviet Union	5.70	
3rd place, bronze medalist(s)	Philippe Houvion	France	5.65	
4	Thierry Vigneron	France	5.60	
5	Jürgen Winkler	West Germany	5.40	
6	Anton Paskalev	Bulgaria	5.40	
7	Brad Pursley	United States	5.30	
8	Rubén Camino	Cuba	5.30	
9	Dimitrios Kyteas	Greece	5.30	
10	Marian Kolasa	Poland	5.30	
11	Stanimir Penchev	Bulgaria	5.20	
12	Roger Oriol	Spain	5.10	
13	Gerald Heinrich	East Germany	5.00	
13	Mauro Barella	Italy	5.00	
13	Viktor Drechsel	Italy	5.00	
	Tomomi Takahashi	Japan	NM	
	Timo Kuusisto	Finland	NM	
	Ernö Makó	Hungary	NM	
	Ilkka Pekkala	Finland	NM	
