= 1982 European Athletics Indoor Championships – Men's pole vault =

The men's pole vault event at the 1982 European Athletics Indoor Championships was held on 7 March.

== Results ==
Rank	Name	Nationality	Results	Notes
1st place, gold medalist(s)	Viktor Spasov	Soviet Union	5.70	=AR, =CR
2nd place, silver medalist(s)	Konstantin Volkov	Soviet Union	5.65	SB
3rd place, bronze medalist(s)	Władysław Kozakiewicz	Poland	5.60	=SB
4	Aleksandr Krupskiy	Soviet Union	5.55	SB
5	Atanas Tarev	Bulgaria	5.55	SB
6	Jean-Michel Bellot	France	5.40	SB
7	Mauro Barella	Italy	5.40	PB
8	Miro Zalar	Sweden	5.40	SB
9	Daniel Aebischer	Switzerland	5.30	PB
10	Reinhard Lechner	Austria	5.20	PB
10	Alain Donias	France	5.20	PB
12	František Jansa	Czechoslovakia	5.00	SB
13	Jürgen Winkler	West Germany	5.00	
13	Roger Oriol	Spain	5.00	SB
	Vincenzo Bellone	Italy	NM	
	Günther Lohre	West Germany	NM	
	Rauli Pudas	Finland	NM	
