= 1984 European Athletics Indoor Championships – Men's pole vault =

The men's pole vault event at the 1984 European Athletics Indoor Championships was held on 4 March.

== Results ==
Rank	Name	Nationality	5.20	5.30	5.40	5.50	5.55	5.60	5.65	5.70	5.75	5.80	5.85	5.90	6.00	Result	Notes
1st place, gold medalist(s)	Thierry Vigneron	France	–	–	o	–	–	o	–	o	–	xo	o	–	xx	5.85	WR, CR
2nd place, silver medalist(s)	Pierre Quinon	France	–	–	xo	–	–	o	–	–	o	–	–	xxx		5.75	
3rd place, bronze medalist(s)	Aleksandr Krupskiy	Soviet Union														5.60	
4	Gerhard Schmidt	West Germany	o	–	xxo	–	o	–	xxx							5.55	
5	Peter Volmer	West Germany	–	xo	–	o	–	xxx								5.50	
6	Marian Kolasa	Poland														5.50	
7	Mariusz Klimczyk	Poland														5.40	
8	Philippe Houvion	France														5.30	
8	Alberto Ruiz	Spain														5.30	
8	Miro Zalar	Sweden														5.30	
11	Kimmo Pallonen	Finland														5.30	
12	Viktor Drechsel	Italy														5.20	
12	František Jansa	Czechoslovakia														5.20	
14	Asko Peltoniemi	Finland														5.20	
15	Sigurður Sigurðsson	Iceland														5.20	
