= Pierre Quinon =

French pole vaulter (1962–2011)

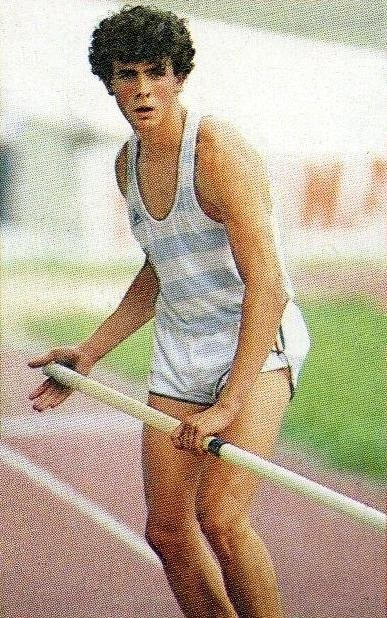
- Pierre Quinon in 1986

Personal information
- Full name: Pierre Jean Guy Quinon
- Nationality: French
- Born: 20 February 1962 Lyon, France
- Died: 17 August 2011 (aged 49) Hyères, France
- Height: 1.80 m (5 ft 11 in)
- Weight: 74 kg (163 lb)

Sport
- Sport: pole vault
- Club: Racing Club de France
Medal record
Men's athletics
Representing France
Olympic Games
Gold medal – first place	1984 Los Angeles	Pole vault
European Indoor Championships
Silver medal – second place	1984 Gothenburg	Pole vault
European Junior Championships
Silver medal – second place	1981 Utrecht	Pole vault

Pierre Quinon (20 February 1962 – 17 August 2011) was a pole vaulter from France who won the 1984 Olympic Games pole vault gold medal and held the pole vault outdoor world record for just four days in the summer of 1983.

== Pole vaulting career ==
=== Before the 1984 Olympic Games ===
Pierre Quinon, whose father was an 800 metres runner, started his pole vaulting career at the Rhodia Club Omnisports (athletics section), which is based in the town of Salaise-sur-Sanne (in the department of Isère). Pierre's father coached him at that club. Pierre did his first pole vaulting training session in the Lyon suburb of Saint-Priest under the supervision of his coach, Christian Bourguignon, who was from Lyon. He made his pole vault competition debut in 1976, at the age of 14, in the town of Le Péage-de-Roussillon (in the department of Isère). He became the French national champion at the youth level (under the age of 18 years) in 1979. He burst onto the scene at the national level in 1981 thanks to a height clearance of 5.50 metres outdoors. He won the silver medal at the 1981 European Junior Championships in Utrecht by clearing a height of 5.30 metres. In 1981, Quinon joined the Racing Club de France in Paris and trained there on a group basis with Patrick Abada, Jean-Michel Bellot and Thierry Vigneron (a former pole vault world record holder), all under the supervision of Jean-Claude Perrin, who was a member of the club's coaching staff.

Quinon's participation at the inaugural 1983 World Championships in Helsinki was a flop; he did not manage to clear a single height in his three attempts. This was to be Quinon's only appearance in an outdoor or indoor World Championships.

On 28 August 1983, during an athletics meeting in the German city of Cologne, Quinon set a new pole vault outdoor world record of 5.82 metres, beating Vladimir Polyakov's 26-month-old outdoor world record by one centimetre. On that day, immediately after winning the pole vault contest, Quinon became the first pole vaulter to attempt to clear 6.00 metres in an official athletics meeting. Although Quinon failed by a significant margin, his coach Jean-Claude Perrin told the French media that Quinon "did not make a fool of himself". "To be alone in front of a bar (in an attempt to set a new world record after having won the contest) was not a fun thing. I preferred fighting the other competitors," Quinon would say later, regarding his failed, world record attempt of 6.00 metres in Cologne. However, Quinon's outdoor world record was very short-lived. On 1 September 1983, in the Italian capital Rome, his countryman Thierry Vigneron beat it by one centimetre.

Quinon won the silver medal with a height of 5.75m at the 1984 European Indoor Championships held in March 1984 in the Swedish city of Gothenburg, with Vigneron taking the gold medal. He also won three Championnats de France d'athlétisme (French National Athletics Championships) outdoor pole vault titles at the senior level in 1982, 1983 and 1984 with heights of 5.55m, 5.65m and 5.70m respectively.

=== 1984 Olympic Games ===
At the 1984 Olympic Games in Los Angeles, in the absence of Sergey Bubka because of the Soviet-led boycott of the 1984 Summer Olympics, Quinon, Vigneron and two Americans - Earl Bell and Mike Tully - were the favorites to win the pole vault title. All four of them had cleared 5.80m or higher prior to these Olympic Games. After Bell and Vigneron had missed three consecutive attempts at 5.70m, Quinon and Tully battled each other for the gold medal. Quinon was leading at 5.70m (he had cleared this height on his first attempt) and Tully was in second position at 5.65m when the bar was raised to 5.75m, with Quinon vaulting first. The Frenchman cleared the 5.75m on his first attempt. Although clearing this height would have put Tully in a tie for first place, he elected to pass. Neither man was successful at clearing 5.80m. Quinon thus won the gold medal with a height of 5.75m, becoming the first French Olympic male pole vault champion (the French had never even won a single medal in this event in previous Olympic Games) and the first French Olympic male or female gold medallist in any jumping event. Fernand Gonder won the 1906 Intercalated Games pole vault gold medal, but medals won in those games are not officially recognized by the International Olympic Committee today. This was to be Quinon's only appearance at the Olympic Games. Tully won the silver medal (5.65m), with Vigneron and Bell each receiving a bronze medal (5.60m). Just after winning the Olympic gold medal, Quinon told L'Équipe in an interview, "I had made it my mission to succeed there (at the Olympic Games) where the other Frenchmen had failed." In the same interview, Quinon considered his Olympic title as a "collective reward" and opined that "the pole vault training programmes started and carried out by Maurice Houvion (who was the coach of Jean Galfione, the 1996 Olympic pole vault champion, for Galfione's entire pole vaulting career) and Jean-Claude Perrin had borne fruit."

=== After the 1984 Olympic Games ===
On 16 July 1985 at the Meeting Nikaïa de Nice in the French city of Nice, Quinon achieved his outdoor personal best of 5.90 metres, exactly 10 centimetres less than the new, outdoor world record set by Sergey Bubka in Paris only three days earlier.

An ankle injury sustained in 1986 and other injuries sustained thereafter adversely affected Quinon's pole vault performance in the later years of his career. He never again pole-vaulted at the standard similar to that of the first half of the 1980s. He did not make the cut for the 1988 Olympics pole vault event in Seoul. Philippe Collet, Philippe d'Encausse and Thierry Vigneron were instead selected to represent France at those Olympics.

In 1989, Quinon settled in Bordeaux. He became a member of a sports club there and was coached by Georges Martin. He lived in Bordeaux until his retirement from pole vaulting in 1993.

== Later life ==
After his retirement, from 1993 onwards, Quinon settled in the Mediterranean coast of the department of Var, in the communes of Le Lavandou, Bormes-les-Mimosas and then Hyères. He would live in the Var until his death. He went into business - he owned a chicken rotisserie business, running it from a van based in Hyères.

In the late 1990s, Quinon created the 'Sports en lumière' in Bormes-les-Mimosas, in co-operation with its town council. The Sports en lumière is an annual sporting event held in Bormes-les-Mimosas that is especially meant for children, during which free workshops on various sports are conducted.

Quinon acted as an advisor to the French pole vaulter Romain Mesnil in 2004, an experience which Quinon deemed as a "failure" when his protégé failed to qualify for the 2004 Olympic Games pole vault final in Athens.

Quinon did abstract painting during the last five years of his life, starting from 2006. He started painting after a meeting with the artist Colin Raffer in the same year. He stated that he had always been interested in painting and that Nicolas de Staël and Jackson Pollock were his role models who inspired him. He exhibited his works regularly in the Var with some success. The first exhibition of his works in February 2010 was a success.

Quinon supported and promoted the bid of his native city - Lyon - to host the 2015 World Masters Athletics Championships. He worked on the preparations for the bid and accompanied his country's senior sports officials to the United States as part of his duties. On 14 July 2011, the three bid cities - Bydgoszcz, Lyon and Perth - made their bidding presentations to the World Masters Athletics General Assembly in Sacramento, California. Quinon's concluding speech made during the bidding presentations seemed to be a major factor in Lyon receiving the greatest number of votes from the General Assembly for both rounds of voting held on the same day immediately after the bidding presentations. Lyon was thus chosen as the host city of the 2015 World Masters Athletics Championships.

== Death ==
Quinon died on 17 August 2011 in Hyères. The manner of death was suicide. Quinon was survived by his mother, his sister (Isabelle), his ex-wife (Caroline Large) and his two sons (Robin and Jean-Baptiste, from his marriage to Caroline Large).

In an interview with the French radio network Europe 1, Jean-Claude Perrin, Quinon's former coach, said, "When a life is lost like that, titles and records do not count any more."

Bernard Amsalem, the president of the Fédération française d'athlétisme, said Quinon "was a great champion. He was atypical in the world of athletics, but he was very likable".

Jean Galfione, the 1996 Olympic Games pole vault gold medallist, said, "Pierre was someone whom I admired. It (a poster of Quinon) was the only poster that I owned in my bedroom when I was a kid." Galfione described Quinon as his role model. Galfione said that they would train together when he was at the beginning of his pole vaulting career and Quinon was nearing the end of his, and that they became close.

=== Funeral and tributes ===
Quinon's funeral took place in the commune of Bormes-les-Mimosas in the department of Var in the afternoon of 23 August 2011. It was attended by more than 200 persons, among them his two sons (Robin and Jean-Baptiste), his ex-wife (Caroline Large), his sister (Isabelle), his mother, Jean-Claude Perrin (his former coach) and notable, retired French athlete like Stéphane Diagana, Maryse Éwanjé-Épée, Thierry Vigneron, Christian Plaziat and William Motti.

The funeral started in front of the town hall, in front of which was placed Quinon's coffin that was draped with the French flag. Two giant, black and white posters of Quinon hung from the balcony of the town hall. The French President Nicolas Sarkozy had a wreath of flowers delivered to the funeral. Albert Vatinet, the mayor of Bormes-les-Mimosas, was the first to deliver a eulogy in praise of his friend. "At present, you are next to the stars, at the summit of Mount Olympus," said Vatinet at the end of his eulogy. The French Sports Minister Chantal Jouanno sent a message of condolence that was read out to the crowd by a representative. In her message, Jouanno recalled the magical moment on 8 Aug 1984 when Quinon became an Olympic champion and announced that all French athletes at the upcoming 2011 World Championships in Athletics would wear black armbands. A very moved Stéphane Diagana, who was a friend of Quinon, read a hand-written letter from Jean Galfione, the 1996 Olympic Games pole vault gold medallist. In his letter, Galfione, who was then in the French city of Brest for a sailing competition (he had been practising sailing competitively since 2007), wrote, "It is thanks to you, Pierre, that I made my first pole vault. You will remain the best." and also expressed his admiration of Quinon - his "hero" - of whom he had a poster in his bedroom. In his eulogy, Diagana described Quinon as an "aesthete of life" who "took great delight in beautiful things".

The French national anthem, La Marseillaise, rang out. The cortege then walked in silence to the Roman Catholic Church of Saint-Trophyme in Bormes-les-Mimosas for a religious ceremony conducted by the parish priest, Father Lopez. During the religious ceremony, Robbie Williams's song Angels, which was chosen by Quinon's family to bid farewell to him, rang out inside the church. In his eulogy, Quinon's older son, Robin, who was then 24 years old, called his father "the hero of his life". In accordance with his wish, Quinon was then buried in the cemetery of Bormes-les-Mimosas. Only family members were present during the burial.

== Legacy ==
On 23 April 2004, Salaise-sur-Sanne's collège gymnasium was renamed "gymnase Pierre Quinon".

The gymnasium in Bormes-les-Mimosas was renamed "gymnase Pierre Quinon" in early September 2011, less than one month after Quinon's death. It was inaugurated on 20 February 2012, on what would have been Quinon's 50th birthday. The inauguration ceremony was attended by Quinon's two sons (Robin and Jean-Baptiste), his ex-wife (Caroline Large), Albert Vatinet (the mayor of Bormes-les-Mimosas), Bernard Amsalem (the president of the Fédération française d'athlétisme), and notable French athletes such as Laurence Bily, Stéphane Diagana, Jean Galfione, Joseph Mahmoud and William Motti.

A newly constructed sports indoor stadium in Nantes, the stadium métropolitain Pierre-Quinon, was opened in September 2013.

== Awards ==
- Chevalier de la Légion d'honneur

== International competition record ==
- only the position and height in the final are indicated

Year	Competition	Venue	Position	Notes
1981	European Junior Championships	Utrecht, Netherlands	2nd	5.30 m
1982	European Championships	Athens, Greece	12th	5.35 m
1983	World Championships	Helsinki, Finland	not ranked	NM
1984	European Indoor Championships	Gothenburg, Sweden	2nd	5.75 m
1984	Olympic Games	Los Angeles, United States	1st	5.75 m
1985	Grand Prix Final	Rome, Italy	3rd	5.70 m

== See also ==
- French all-time top lists - Pole vault
- Men's pole vault world record progression

Records
Preceded by (Soviet Union) Vladimir Polyakov	Men's Pole Vault World Record Holder; 28 August 1983 – 1 September 1983	Succeeded by (France) Thierry Vigneron
