= Athletics at the 1980 Summer Olympics – Men's pole vault =

Men's pole vault at the Games of the XXII Olympiad
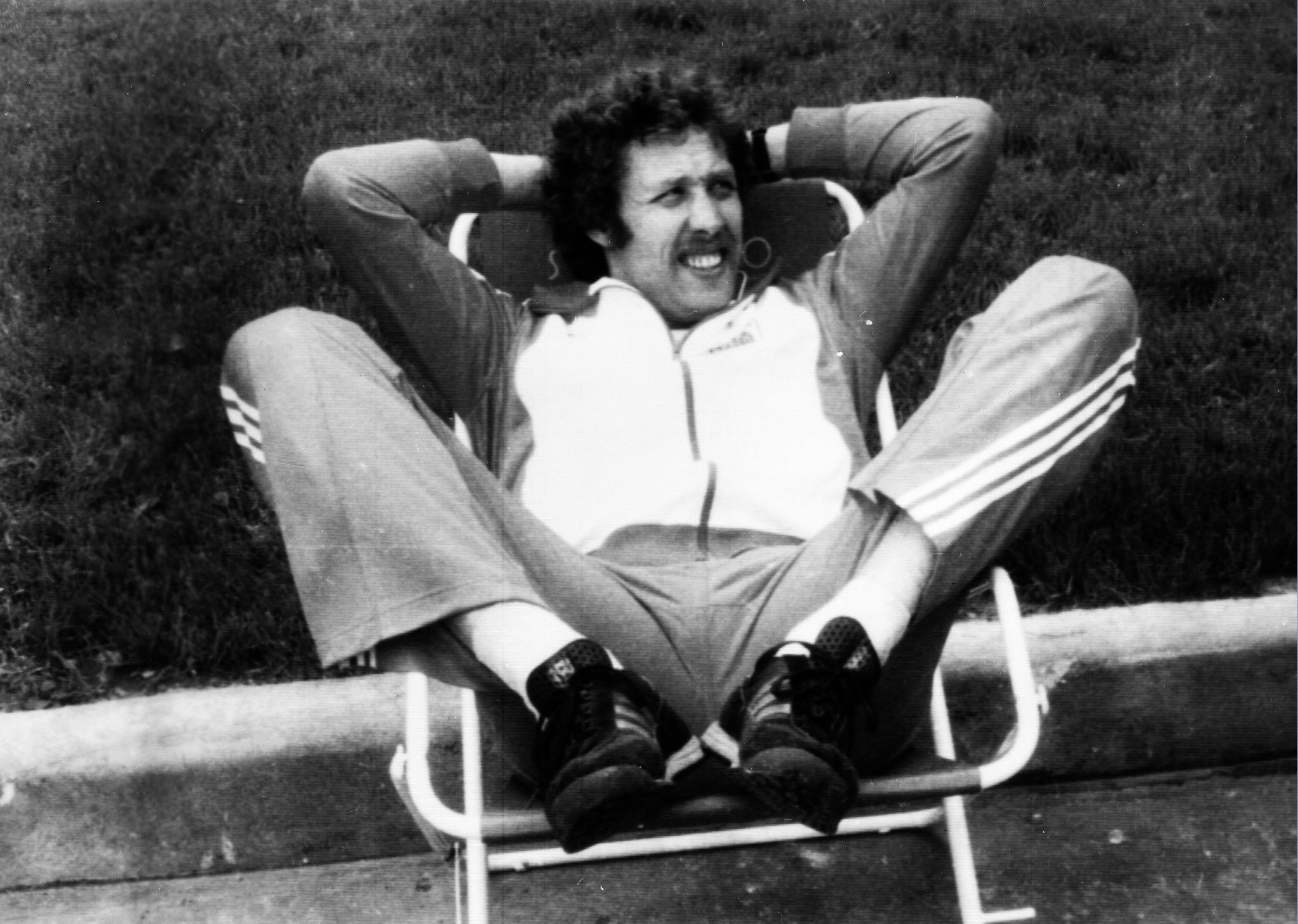
- Władysław Kozakiewicz
- Venue: Luzhniki Stadium
- Date: 28 July 1980 (qualifying); 30 July 1980 (final)
- Competitors: 19 from 10 nations
- Winning height: 5.78 WR

Medalists
| 1st place, gold medalist(s) | | Władysław Kozakiewicz; Poland |
| 2nd place, silver medalist(s) | | Konstantin Volkov; Soviet Union |
| 2nd place, silver medalist(s) | | Tadeusz Ślusarski; Poland |

Official Video

The men's pole vault event at the 1980 Summer Olympics in Moscow, Soviet Union had an entry list of 19 competitors from 10 nations. The maximum number of athletes per nation had been set at 3 since the 1930 Olympic Congress. The final was held on Wednesday July 30, 1980. The top twelve and ties and all those clearing 5.40 metres advanced to the final. The event was won by Władysław Kozakiewicz of Poland, the nation's second consecutive victory in the men's pole vault. His countryman Tadeusz Ślusarski, who had won the event four years earlier, became the fifth man to earn two medals in the event when he finished in a tie for silver. The other silver went to Konstantin Volkov and was the Soviet Union's first pole vault medal.

Throughout the event, home town fans were cheering for Volkov, while booing, whistling and jeering at the Polish Ślusarski and Kozakiewicz. There were even accusations that the Soviet facility management were opening and closing giant doors to the stadium to change the wind pattern against opposing vaulters.

When Kozakiewicz secured his gold medal position, Kozakiewicz made the bras d'honneur gesture which became known as "Kozakiewicz's gesture" (gest Kozakiewicza). in defiance to the Soviet crowd. He later confirmed his dominance over the competition by breaking the world record, clearing at 5.78 meters.

The photos of this incident circled the globe with the exception of the Soviet Union and its satellites, although the event was broadcast live on TV in many countries of the Bloc.

Kozakiewicz's act received much support in Polish society, which resented Soviet control over Eastern Europe: Poland was in the midst of labor strikes that led to the creation of the labor union Solidarity less than two months later.

After the 1980 Olympics ended, the Soviet ambassador to Poland demanded that Kozakiewicz be stripped of his medal over his "insult to the Soviet people". The official response of the Polish government was that Kozakiewicz's arm gesture had been an involuntary muscle spasm caused by his exertion.

== Background ==
This was the 19th appearance of the event, which is one of 12 athletics events to have been held at every Summer Olympics. The returning finalists from the 1976 Games were gold medalist Tadeusz Ślusarski of Poland, silver medalist Antti Kalliomäki of Finland, seventh-place finisher Jean-Michel Bellot of France, tenth-place finisher Yuriy Prokhorenko of the Soviet Union, eleventh-place finisher Władysław Kozakiewicz of Poland, fifteenth-place finisher Tapani Haapakoski of Finland, and sixteenth-place finisher Brian Hooper of Great Britain. While American dominance of the event had been broken in the 1970s, the boycott still affected the event by keeping out strong contenders Mike Tully and Tom Hintnaus. France competed and had two of the top vaulters: Thierry Vigneron (who had broken the world record twice in the lead-up to the Games) and Philippe Houvion (who held the world record, having broken Vigneron's best). The Polish team was also very strong, including returning champion Ślusarski as well as Kozakiewicz, who had held the world record before Vigneron. Soviet Konstantin Volkov was the home-nation favorite.

No nations made their pole vaulting debut in 1980. France made its 15th appearance, the most of any nation competing, though behind the absent United States' 18 appearances.

== Competition format ==
The competition used the two-round format introduced in 1912, with results cleared between rounds. Vaulters received three attempts at each height. Ties were broken by the countback rule. At the time, total attempts was used after total misses.

In the qualifying round, the bar was set at 5.15 metres, 5.25 metres, 5.35 metres, and 5.40 metres. All vaulters clearing 5.40 metres advanced to the final. If fewer than 12 cleared that height, the top 12 (including ties) advanced.

In the final, the bar was set at 5.15 metres, 5.25 metres, 5.35 metres, 5.45 metres, and then increased by 5 centimetres as a time.

== Records ==
Prior to the competition, the existing world and Olympic records were as follows.

| World record | Philippe Houvion (FRA) | 5.77 | Paris, France | 17 July 1980 |
| Olympic record | Wolfgang Nordwig (GDR) | 5.50 | Munich, East Germany | 2 September 1972 |

Six men broke the Olympic record, clearing 5.55 metres or 5.60 metres, all on their first attempt. Four of them were successful at 5.65 metres, with Władysław Kozakiewicz taking the lead by being the only one to clear it on the first attempt, maintaining his perfect round, while Konstantin Volkov, Tadeusz Ślusarski and Philippe Houvion cleared it on their third. Volkov and Ślusarski had perfect rounds before 5.65 and were tied in silver medal position. Kozakiewicz took sole control of the new Olympic record by winning the event at 5.70 metres, responding to the Soviet biased crowd with his Kozakiewicz's gesture. He was not done. He extended it further by clearing 5.75 metres maintaining his perfect round, before setting his sights on the world record. On his second attempt at 5.78 metres, he cleared the bar to set a new world record.

== Schedule ==
All times are Moscow Time (UTC+3)

| Date | Time | Round |
|---|---|---|
| Monday, 28 July 1980 | 10:00 | Qualifying |
| Wednesday, 30 July 1980 | 16:30 | Final |

== Results ==
Key

- o = Height cleared
- x = Height failed
- – = Height passed
- r = Retired
- SB = Season's best
- PB = Personal best
- NR = National record
- AR = Area record
- OR = Olympic record
- WR = World record
- WL = World lead
- NM = No mark
- DNS = Did not start
- DQ = Disqualified

=== Qualifying ===
The qualifying round was held on Monday July 28, 1980. Qualification rule: Qualifying performance 5.40 (Q) or at least 12 best performers (q) advance to the final.

| Rank | Group | Athlete | Nation | 5.15 | 5.25 | 5.35 | 5.40 | Height | Notes |
|---|---|---|---|---|---|---|---|---|---|
| 1 | A | Tadeusz Ślusarski | Poland | – | xo | – | o | 5.40 | Q |
| 1 | B | Mariusz Klimczyk | Poland | – | xo | – | o | 5.40 | Q |
| 3 | A | Jean-Michel Bellot | France | – | o | xo | o | 5.40 | Q |
| 4 | A | Thierry Vigneron | France | xo | xo | xo | o | 5.40 | Q |
| 5 | A | Władysław Kozakiewicz | Poland | – | o | – | xo | 5.40 | Q |
| 6 | B | Miro Zalar | Sweden | o | o | o | xo | 5.40 | Q |
| 7 | B | Tapani Haapakoski | Finland | – | o | xo | xo | 5.40 | Q |
| 8 | A | Konstantin Volkov | Soviet Union | – | o | o | – | 5.35 | q |
| 9 | B | Rauli Pudas | Finland | – | o | o | xxx | 5.35 | q |
| 10 | B | Brian Hooper | Great Britain | o | o | xo | xxx | 5.35 | q |
| 11 | A | Sergey Kulibaba | Soviet Union | – | xo | xo | – | 5.35 | q |
| 12 | A | Philippe Houvion | France | o | xxo | xo | x | 5.35 | q |
| 13 | B | Atanas Tarev | Bulgaria | – | xo | xxx | — | 5.25 | |
| 14 | A | Felix Böhni | Switzerland | o | xxx | — | | 5.15 | |
| 15 | B | Axel Weber | East Germany | xo | xxx | — | | 5.15 | |
| — | A | Antti Kalliomäki | Finland | – | – | xxx | — | No mark | |
| — | A | Yuriy Prokhorenko | Soviet Union | – | – | xxx | — | No mark | |
| — | B | Patrick Desruelles | Belgium | xxx | — | | | No mark | |
| — | B | Ivo Yanchev | Bulgaria | xxx | — | | | No mark | |

=== Final ===
The final was held on Wednesday July 30, 1980.

| Rank | Athlete | Nation | 5.15 | 5.25 | 5.35 | 5.45 | 5.50 | 5.55 | 5.60 | 5.65 | 5.70 | 5.75 | 5.78 | 5.82 | Height | Notes |
|---|---|---|---|---|---|---|---|---|---|---|---|---|---|---|---|---|
| 1st place, gold medalist(s) | Władysław Kozakiewicz | Poland | – | – | o | – | o | – | o | o | o | o | xo | xxx | 5.78 | WR |
| 2nd place, silver medalist(s) | Konstantin Volkov | Soviet Union | – | – | o | – | – | o | – | xxo | xx– | x | — | | 5.65 | |
| 2nd place, silver medalist(s) | Tadeusz Ślusarski | Poland | – | – | o | – | – | o | – | xxo | xxx | — | | | 5.65 | |
| 4 | Philippe Houvion | France | – | xo | – | xo | – | o | – | xxo | xxx | — | | | 5.65 | |
| 5 | Jean-Michel Bellot | France | – | – | o | – | o | – | o | xxx | — | | | | 5.60 | |
| 6 | Mariusz Klimczyk | Poland | – | o | – | xo | – | o | – | xxx | — | | | | 5.55 | |
| 7 | Thierry Vigneron | France | – | o | – | o | – | xxx | — | | | | | | 5.45 | |
| 8 | Sergey Kulibaba | Soviet Union | – | xo | – | o | – | xxx | — | | | | | | 5.45 | |
| 9 | Tapani Haapakoski | Finland | – | xo | – | xo | – | xxx | — | | | | | | 5.45 | |
| 10 | Miro Zalar | Sweden | – | o | o | xx– | x | — | | | | | | | 5.35 | |
| 11 | Brian Hooper | Great Britain | o | o | xxo | xxx | — | | | | | | | | 5.35 | |
| 12 | Rauli Pudas | Finland | – | o | – | xxx | — | | | | | | | | 5.25 | |

== See also ==
- Kozakiewicz's gesture
- 1982 Men's European Championships Pole Vault (Athens)
- 1983 Men's World Championships Pole Vault (Helsinki)
- 1984 Men's Olympic Pole Vault (Los Angeles)
- 1986 Men's European Championships Pole Vault (Stuttgart)
- 1987 Men's World Championships Pole Vault (Rome)
