= 1985 IAAF Grand Prix Final =

- Host city: Rome, Italy
- Events: 16
- Dates: 7 September
- Main venue: Stadio Olimpico

The 1985 IAAF Grand Prix Final was the first edition of the season-ending competition for track and field, organised by the International Association of Athletics Federations. It was held at the Stadio Olimpico in Rome, Italy on 7 September 1985. Americans Doug Padilla (5000 metres) and Mary Slaney (3000 metres) were the overall points winners of the tournament.

== Medal summary ==
=== Men ===
Event	Gold		Silver		Bronze	
200 metres	Calvin Smith (USA)	20.54	Kirk Baptiste (USA)	20.57	Desai Williams (CAN)	20.76
400 metres	Mike Franks (USA)	44.87	Ray Armstead (USA)	45.24	Mark Rowe (USA)	45.56
1500 metres	José Manuel Abascal (ESP)	3:36.21	Omer Khalifa (SUD)	3:36.45	Steve Scott (USA)	3:36.88
5000 metres	Doug Padilla (USA)	13:27.79	Sydney Maree (USA)	13:28.04	Thomas Wessinghage (FRG)	13:29.01
110 m hurdles	Tonie Campbell (USA)	13.27	Andre Phillips (USA)	13.29	Sam Turner (USA)	13.44
Pole vault	Sergey Bubka (URS)	5.85 m	Thierry Vigneron (FRA)	5.80 m	Aleksandr Krupskiy (URS) Pierre Quinon (FRA)	5.70 m
Long jump	Mike Conley, Sr. (USA)	8.22 m	Larry Myricks (USA)	8.22 m	László Szalma (HUN)	8.11 m
Discus throw	Imrich Bugár (TCH)	66.26 m	Knut Hjeltnes (NOR)	64.60 m	Géjza Valent (TCH)	63.44 m
Javelin throw	Tom Petranoff (USA)	90.80 m	Duncan Atwood (USA)	90.30 m	Dave Ottley (GBR)	84.32 m

=== Women ===
Event	Gold		Silver		Bronze	
100 metres	Florence Griffith (USA)	11.00	Alice Brown (USA)	11.04	Merlene Ottey (JAM)	11.09
800 metres	Jarmila Kratochvílová (TCH)	1:59.09	Milena Strnadová (TCH)	2:00.09	Kirsty McDermott (GBR)	2:00.23
3000 metres	Mary Slaney (USA)	8:25.83	Maricica Puică (ROM)	8:27.83	Zola Budd (GBR)	8:28.83
400 m hurdles	Judi Brown-King (USA)	54.38	Debbie Flintoff (AUS)	54.80	Tonja Brown (USA)	54.86
High jump	Stefka Kostadinova (BUL)	2.00 m	Louise Ritter (USA)	1.98 m	Tamara Bykova (URS)	1.95 m
Long jump	Jackie Joyner (USA)	6.91 m	Galina Chistyakova (URS)	6.83 m	Carol Lewis (USA)	6.73 m
Shot put	Mihaela Loghin (ROM)	20.82 m	Helena Fibingerová (TCH)	20.32 m	Natalya Lisovskaya (URS)	19.86 m

== Points leaders ==
=== Men ===
Event	Gold		Silver		Bronze	
Overall	Doug Padilla (USA)	63	Mike Franks (USA)	60	Sergey Bubka (URS)	59
200 metres	Calvin Smith (USA)	59	Kirk Baptiste (USA)	48	Desai Williams (CAN)	35.5
400 metres	Mike Franks (USA)	60	Ray Armstead (USA)	47	Mark Rowe (USA)	44
1500 metres	Steve Scott (USA)	46	Pierre Délèze (SUI)	44	José Manuel Abascal (ESP)	40
5000 metres	Doug Padilla (USA)	63	Sydney Maree (USA)	47	Thomas Wessinghage (FRG)	42
110 m hurdles	Mark McKoy (CAN)	52	Andre Phillips (USA)	41	Tonie Campbell (USA)	37
Pole vault	Sergey Bubka (URS)	59	Pierre Quinon (FRA)	53	Thierry Vigneron (FRA)	49
Long jump	Mike Conley, Sr. (USA)	49	Larry Myricks (USA)	37	Sergey Layevskiy (URS)	34
Discus throw	Imrich Bugár (TCH)	52	Knut Hjeltnes (NOR)	41	Géjza Valent (TCH)	41
Javelin throw	Tom Petranoff (USA)	55	Dave Ottley (GBR)	50	Einar Vilhjálmsson (ISL)	45

=== Women ===
Event	Gold		Silver		Bronze	
Overall	Mary Slaney (USA)	69	Stefka Kostadinova (BUL)	63	Judi Brown-King (USA)	63
100 metres	Alice Brown (USA)	46	Merlene Ottey (JAM)	45	Florence Griffith (USA)	39
800 metres	Jarmila Kratochvílová (TCH)	59	Doina Melinte (ROM)	53	Milena Strnadová (TCH)	43
3000 metres	Mary Slaney (USA)	69	Maricica Puică (ROM)	53	Lynn Williams (CAN)	37
400 m hurdles	Judi Brown-King (USA)	63	Genowefa Błaszak (POL)	53	Debbie Flintoff (AUS)	46
High jump	Stefka Kostadinova (BUL)	63	Louise Ritter (USA)	53	Tamara Bykova (URS)	43.5
Long jump	Galina Chistyakova (URS)	36	Tatyana Rodionova (URS)	30	Jackie Joyner (USA)	25
Shot put	Helena Fibingerová (TCH)	30	Natalya Lisovskaya (URS)	30	Mihaela Loghin (ROM)	24
