= Athletics at the 1977 Summer Universiade – Men's pole vault =

The men's pole vault event at the 1977 Summer Universiade was held at the Vasil Levski National Stadium in Sofia on 20 and 21 August.

== Medalists ==
| Gold | Silver | Bronze |
|---|---|---|
| Władysław Kozakiewicz; Poland | Tadeusz Ślusarski; Poland | Vladimir Trofimenko; Soviet Union |

== Results ==
=== Qualification ===
| Rank | Group | Athlete | Nationality | Result | Notes |
|---|---|---|---|---|---|
| ? | ? | Roger Oriol | Spain | 5.00 | |
| ? | ? | Ilias Sakelariadis | Greece | 5.00 | |
| ? | ? | Lakhdar Rahal | Algeria | 5.00 | |
| ? | ? | Stefan Stefanov | Bulgaria | 5.00 | |
| ? | ? | Bruce Simpson | Canada | 5.00 | |
| ? | ? | Dimitrios Kiteas | Greece | 5.00 | |
| ? | ? | Philippe Houvion | France | 5.00 | |
| ? | ? | Roberto Moré | Cuba | 5.00 | |
| ? | ? | Wolfgang Reinhard | West Germany | 5.00 | |
| ? | ? | Vladimir Kishkun | Soviet Union | 5.00 | |
| ? | ? | Jeff Taylor | United States | 5.00 | |
| ? | ? | Charlie Brown | United States | 5.00 | |
| ? | ? | Vladimir Trofimenko | Soviet Union | 5.00 | |
| ? | ? | Tadeusz Ślusarski | Poland | 5.00 | |
| ? | ? | Władysław Kozakiewicz | Poland | 5.00 | |
| ? | ? | Tomomi Takahashi | Japan | 4.80 | |
| ? | ? | Vesselin Tsonev | Bulgaria | 4.80 | |
| ? | ? | Heinz Speckbacher | Austria | 4.60 | |
| | ? | Dominique Herbert-Suffrin | France | NM | |

=== Final ===
| Rank | Athlete | Nationality | Result | Notes |
|---|---|---|---|---|
| 1st place, gold medalist(s) | Władysław Kozakiewicz | Poland | 5.55 | |
| 2nd place, silver medalist(s) | Tadeusz Ślusarski | Poland | 5.50 | |
| 3rd place, bronze medalist(s) | Vladimir Trofimenko | Soviet Union | 5.50 | |
| 4 | Wolfgang Reinhard | West Germany | 5.30 | |
| 5 | Vladimir Kishkun | Soviet Union | 5.20 | |
| 6 | Philippe Houvion | France | 5.20 | |
| 6 | Lakhdar Rahal | Algeria | 5.20 | |
| 8 | Jeff Taylor | United States | 5.20 | |
| 9 | Roberto Moré | Cuba | 5.00 | |
| 10 | Bruce Simpson | Canada | 5.00 | |
| 11 | Ilias Sakelariadis | Greece | 5.00 | |
| 12 | Stefan Stefanov | Bulgaria | 4.80 | |
| | Roger Oriol | Spain | NM | |
| | Dimitrios Kiteas | Greece | NM | |
| | Charlie Brown | United States | NM | |
