= Athletics at the Friendship Games – Men's pole vault =

The men's pole vault event at the Friendship Games was held on 18 August 1984 at the Grand Arena of the Central Lenin Stadium in Moscow, Soviet Union.

== Results ==
Rank	Name	Nationality	Result	Notes
1st place, gold medalist(s)	Konstantin Volkov	Soviet Union	5.80	
2nd place, silver medalist(s)	Sergej Bubka	Soviet Union	5.70	
3rd place, bronze medalist(s)	Aleksandr Krupskiy	Soviet Union	5.70	
–	Vladimir Polyakov	Soviet Union	5.60	
–	Pavel Bogatyryov	Soviet Union	5.60	
4	Ivo Yanchev	Bulgaria	5.60	
5	Marian Kolasa	Poland	5.50	
6	Władysław Kozakiewicz	Poland	5.40	
7	Atanas Tarev	Bulgaria	5.40	
8	Andreas Kramss	East Germany	5.20	

== See also ==
- Athletics at the 1984 Summer Olympics – Men's pole vault
