= Mariusz Klimczyk =

Polish pole vaulter

Medal record

Men's athletics

Representing Poland

European Indoor Championships
Bronze medal – third place	1977 San Sebastián	Pole vault

Mariusz Klimczyk (born 16 September 1956 in Bydgoszcz) is a retired pole vaulter from Poland.

== International competitions ==
Year	Competition	Venue	Position	Notes
1975	European Junior Championships	Athens, Greece	4th	4.80 m
1976	European Indoor Championships	Munich, West Germany	11th	4.90 m
1977	European Indoor Championships	San Sebastián, Spain	3rd	5.20 m
1978	European Championships	Prague, Czech Republic	1st (q)	5.25 m^{1}
1979	European Indoor Championships	Vienna, Austria	6th	5.40 m
1980	European Indoor Championships	Sindelfingen, West Germany	8th	5.40 m
1980	Olympic Games	Moscow, Soviet Union	6th	5.55 m
1981	European Indoor Championships	Grenoble, France	5th	5.55 m
1984	European Indoor Championships	Gothenburg, Sweden	7th	5.40 m
1985	World Indoor Games	Paris, France	7th	5.50 m
1985	European Indoor Championships	Piraeus, Greece	15th	5.30 m

^{1}No mark in the final
