= Rauli Pudas =

Finnish pole vaulter (born 1954)

Medal record

Men's athletics

Representing Finland

European Championships
Bronze medal – third place	1978 Prague	Pole vault

Rauli Antero Pudas (September 13, 1954 Alavieska) is a retired male pole vaulter from Finland. His personal best jump was 5.60 metres, achieved in July 1980 in Raahe. He became the Finnish champion in 1980.

== Achievements ==
Year	Competition	Venue	Position	Notes
1978	European Indoor Championships	Milan, Italy	11th	5.00 m
1978	European Championships	Prague, Czechoslovakia	3rd	5.45 m
1979	European Indoor Championships	Vienna, Austria	9th	5.20 m
1980	Olympic Games	Moscow, Soviet Union	12th	5.25 m
1981	European Indoor Championships	Grenoble, France	12th	5.35 m
1982	European Indoor Championships	Milan, Italy	–	NM
1982	European Championships	Athens, Greece	–	NM
