= Władysław Kozakiewicz =

Polish pole vaulter

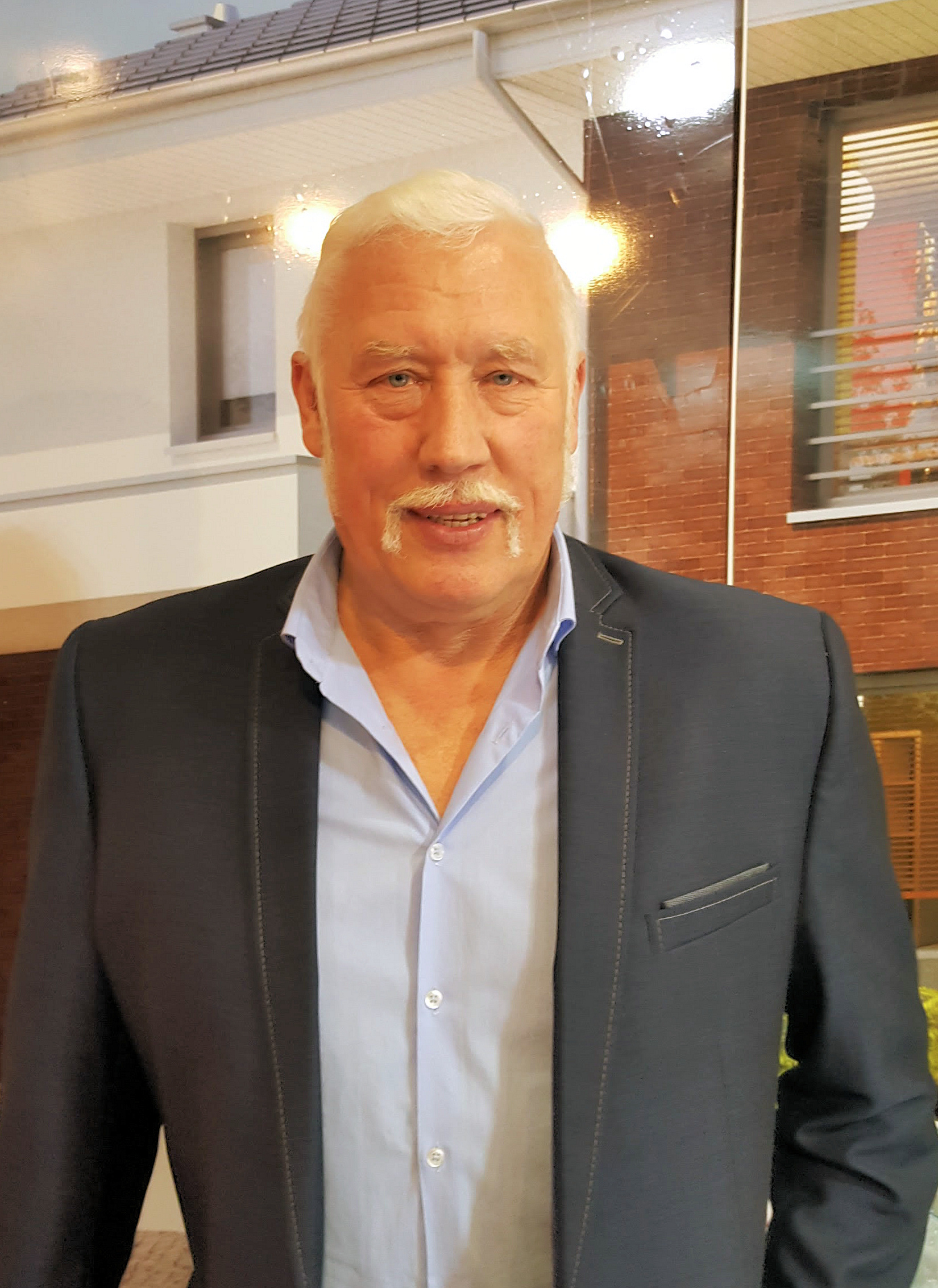
- Kozakiewicz in 2016

Personal information
- Nickname: Wolly
- Nationality: Polish/German
- Born: 8 December 1953 (age 72) Šalčininkai, Lithuanian SSR, Soviet Union (now Lithuania)
- Education: Poznań University of Physical Education
- Height: 1.87 m (6 ft 1 1/2 in)
- Weight: 82 kg (181 lb)

Sport
- Country: Poland
- Sport: Athletics
- Event: Pole vault
- Club: KS Bałtyk Gdynia (1966–1985); Turn-Klub zu Hannover (1985–1989)
- Coached by: Walenty Wejman (1966–1974); Ryszard Tomaszewski (1974–1981, 1983–1985); Edward Kozakiewicz (1981–1983)
- Retired: 1989

Achievements and titles
- Personal best: Pole vault: 5.78 m (1980)
Medal record
Men's athletics
Representing Poland
Olympic Games
Gold medal – first place	1980 Moscow	Pole vault
European Championships
Silver medal – second place	1974 Rome	Pole vault
European Indoor Championships
Gold medal – first place	1977 San Sebastián	Pole vault
Gold medal – first place	1979 Vienna	Pole vault
Bronze medal – third place	1975 Katowice	Pole vault
Bronze medal – third place	1982 Milan	Pole vault
Universiade
Gold medal – first place	1977 Sofia	Pole vault
Gold medal – first place	1979 Mexico City	Pole vault

Władysław Kozakiewicz (Polish pronunciation: [vwaˈdɨswaf kɔzaˈkʲɛvit͡ʂ]; born 8 December 1953) is a Lithuanian-born retired Polish athlete who specialised in the pole vault. He is best known for winning the gold medal at the 1980 Summer Olympics in Moscow and the bras d'honneur gesture which he showed to the hostile Soviet crowd. In Poland, where the gesture was viewed as a symbol of resistance against Soviet dominance, it became known as "Kozakiewicz's gesture" (gest Kozakiewicza). In addition, he won several medals at continental level, won two Summer Universiades and broke the pole vault world record three times, twice outdoors and once indoors. He is also a ten-time Polish champion.

== Early years ==
Kozakiewicz was born on 8 December 1953 to a Polish family in Šalčininkai, Lithuanian SSR, near Vilnius as the fourth and youngest of four siblings. His father Stanisław was a tailor, his mother Franciszka a housewife. As he revealed in his 2013 autobiography, he was physically abused by his father during his childhood as was his entire family. The family moved to Poland in 1958 as part of the last wave of the post-war repatriations of Poles living in the Soviet Union, first staying in a refugee camp in Gryfice before settling in Gdynia where Władysław's father found a job as a dockworker.

== Athletics career ==
Władysław's older brother Edward (b. 1948) was an aspiring pole vaulter (later switched to decathlon) at the local club, Bałtyk Gdynia, and one day in 1966 encouraged his then 13-year-old brother to also give athletics a try. He showed his brother how to pole vault and Władysław's talent was soon noticed by Walenty Wejman who became his first coach. In 1972 Władysław Kozakiewicz broke Polish junior records both indoors and out, also breaking the 5 metres barrier for the first time. A year later, after changing the coach to Ryszard Tomaszewski, he broke the Polish senior record with 5.35 metres and made his major international debut taking silver at the 1974 European Championships in Rome. In 1975 at the European Indoor Championships in Katowice, he won a bronze medal and later in the season at the Janusz Kusociński Memorial he jumped 5.60 metres setting a new European record.

=== The dominant years ===
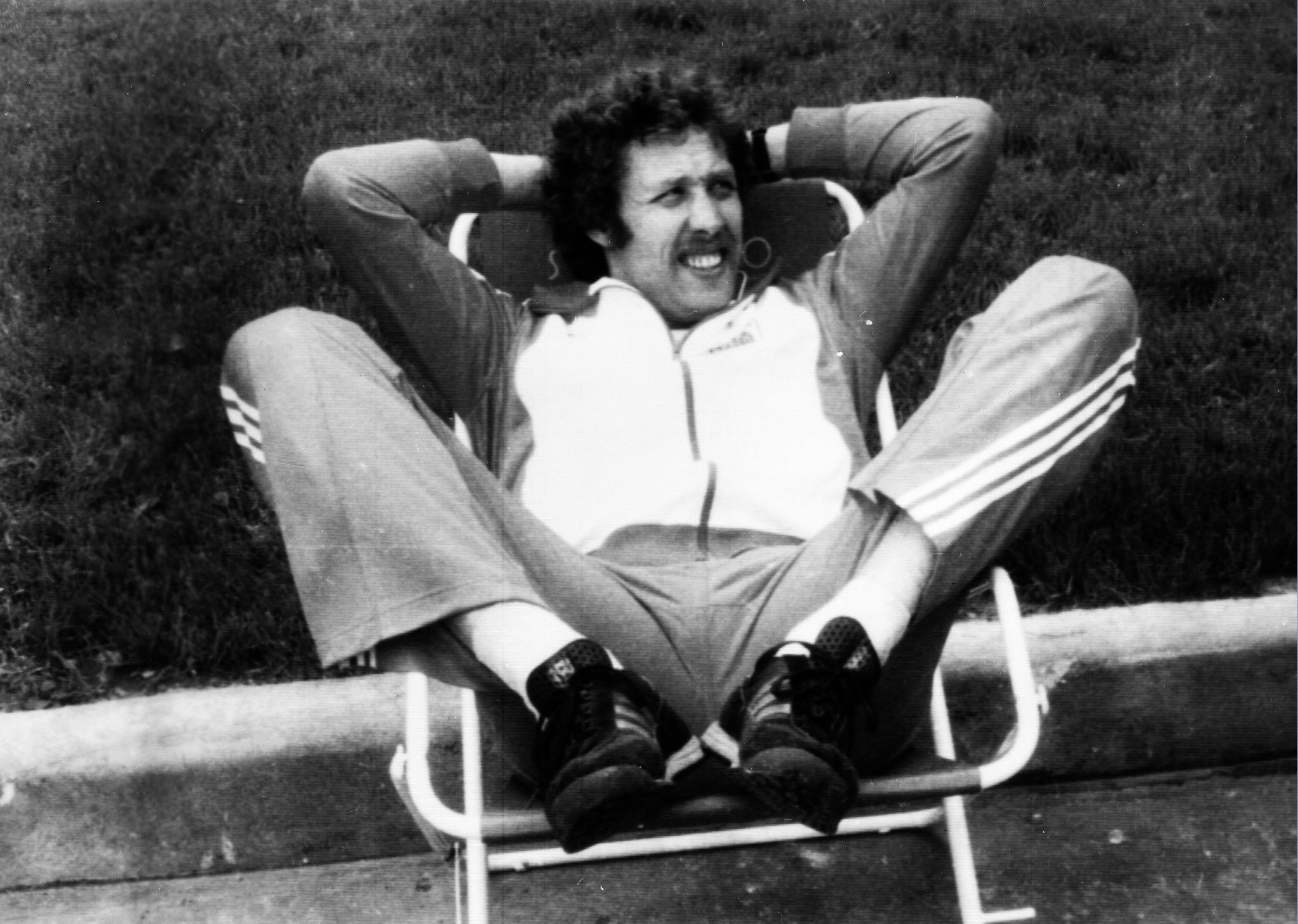
Kozakiewicz in 1980.

At the 1976 Summer Olympics in Montreal, Kozakiewicz was one of the favourites for the gold but the Olympic debut ended in a disappointment. During a warm-up jump before the final, he ruptured his joint capsule and was later only able to clear 5.25 metres which gave him the 11th place. The competition was won by his unheralded compatriot, Tadeusz Ślusarski. Kozakiewicz was able to return to competition just three weeks after Montreal. Soon after, however, he was disqualified by the Polish Athletic Association (PZLA) for competing in the shoes of the Japanese manufacturer Onitsuka Tiger, with which he signed a contract a year earlier, instead of Adidas, which was then the official sponsor of the federation. This resulted in Kozakiewicz being barred from competing abroad for six months and marked the beginning of a series of disputes with the national federation and bans for insubordination.

The disqualification was eventually shortened so that Kozakiewicz could compete at the 1977 European Indoor Championships in San Sebastián which he won in a new championships record of 5.51 metres. This started a very successful season in which he, among others, won the Summer Universiade in Sofia and set a new European record of 5.66 metres in the European Cup semifinal in Warsaw. In the entire year he suffered only one loss, at the 1977 World Cup, where, representing Europe, he came second behind the American Mike Tully.

The next season while again full of victories at various meetings, saw Kozakiewicz narrowly missing out on medals at two major international competitions. First he came fifth at the 1978 European Indoor Championships in Milan, and then, affected by an illness, fourth at the 1978 European Championships in Prague. The latter performance was deemed a big loss by the federation and he was handed another half-year disqualification.

In 1979 Kozakiewicz won the European Indoor Championships in Vienna, his second gold at this competition, improving the indoor European record to 5.58 metres. He later won the 1979 Summer Universiade in Mexico City where at altitude he jumped 5.60 metres.

The 1980 season did not start very well as he finished only fourth at the 1980 European Indoor Championships in Sindelfingen, West Germany, the competition won by the Soviet Konstantin Volkov, who would be Kozakiewicz's main rival at the upcoming Moscow Olympics. However, in May that year at a meeting in Milan, Kozakiewicz for the first time in his career broke the world record with a mark of 5.72 metres. The record was later that summer bettered by two Frenchmen, first Thierry Vigneron added three centimetres to it and then Philippe Houvion another two, setting it at 5.77 metres.

=== Olympic gold and Kozakiewicz's gesture ===
Kozakiewicz's gesture.

The sporting level in the Olympic final which took place on 30 July 1980 at the Central Lenin Stadium in Moscow, was significantly higher than four years earlier with no less than six athletes jumping higher than the previous Olympic record. The atmosphere at the stadium, however, as it was for the entire games was very hostile with the local Soviet crowd booing, hissing, and whistling at every non-Soviet competitor's attempt. Soviet officials even tried to disrupt Kozakiewicz by opening doors to the stadium during his jumps so wind conditions would disturb him.

This irritated Kozakiewicz who, after jumping 5.70 metres, higher than any other competitor that day, showed the bras d'honneur gesture in defiance to the jeering spectators. He then repeated the gesture after clearing 5.75 metres which ensured his victory over the local favourite, Konstantin Volkov. He finally confirmed his dominance over the competition by breaking the world record with 5.78 meters. This was the first time since 1920 that the world record in pole vault was broken at the Olympic Games.

The photos of the incident circled the globe, with the exception of the Soviet Union and its satellites, although the event was broadcast live on TV in many countries of the Eastern Bloc. While international observers varied in their reaction to the incident, Kozakiewicz's act received much support in Polish society, which resented Soviet control over Eastern Europe (Poland was in the midst of labour strikes that led to the creation of the labour union Solidarity less than two months later). After the 1980 Olympics ended, the Soviet ambassador to Poland demanded that Kozakiewicz be stripped of his medal over his "insult to the Soviet people". The official response of the Polish government was that Kozakiewicz's arm gesture had been an involuntary muscle spasm caused by his exertion.

In an interview years later, Kozakiewicz gave his thoughts about the incident:

The Russian crowd was whistling... at any non-Russian contestant. They were whistling to distract us, you can only imagine the noise: 70,000 people at the Luzhniki Stadium, probably only 10,000 of them were tourists.

It occurred to me that I'm the only person in the world who got whistled at for breaking the world record. So when I landed, I showed them this 'Polish shaft', the nicest one you can imagine. I expressed my anger at the whistling Soviet audience; nobody whistles in athletics. If you take a look at TV broadcasts, you find that people either clap rhythmically when they feel like it, or simply sit quietly.

=== After Moscow ===
In 1982, struggling to get into form after splitting from his long-time coach Ryszard Tomaszewski, Kozakiewicz won what would be his last medal for Poland, a bronze at the 1982 European Indoor Championships in Milan. In the summer, he decided to skip the outdoor European Championships citing poor form, for which he received another 6-month disqualification from PZLA. The following 1983 season did not begin well for Kozakiewicz as he finished only 9th at the 1983 European Indoor Championships in Budapest. After that poor showing he reunited with coach Tomaszewski and tried to build form for the 1983 World Championships in Helsinki. He eventually finished eighth in that event clearing 5.40 metres. In the Olympic year of 1984, Kozakiewicz jumped much better reaching 5.75 metres in July. However, due to a Soviet-led boycott of the Los Angeles Olympics most athletes from the Eastern bloc could not compete in the Games. Instead, an alternative event was organised for the socialist countries, the Friendship Games, with men's athletics being contested in Moscow. Kozakiewicz, not willing to take part in what he saw as a farcical event, took only one successful attempt at 5.40 metres before feigning an injury and calling it quits. His performance angered the Polish federation which demanded that he immediately return to Poland from a meeting in Brussels in which he took part soon after the Friendship Games and after he refused he was disqualified again.

=== Defection to West Germany ===
Even after his disqualification ended in 1985, Kozakiewicz was not allowed to participate in meetings abroad unless he jumped 5.70 metres. Given he was recovering from a knee surgery this did not seem realistic and not being able to support his family he decided to flee Poland. He last competed for his native country in April in São Paulo and in July 1985 he defected to West Germany. A move which was intended to be a temporary means to earn some money before retiring would later turn out to be permanent. He based himself in Hannover, and joined a local club where he also became a pole vaulting coach. In May 1986 Kozakiewicz gained West German citizenship as his wife's grandparents were born in Germany. Soon after he set a new West German record of 5.70 metres which lasted until 1994. In 1988 Kozakiewicz jumped 5.62 metres, the standard for the 1988 Olympic Games in Seoul, however, according to the rules, the Polish federation had to give him permission to compete for a new country at the Olympics, which it did not. Kozakiewicz retired from professional athletics in 1989.

== After athletics ==
In the 1980s and 1990s apart from training young talents, he also worked as a manager for many professional athletes, mostly from the former Soviet Union. Between 1998 and 2002 he was a member of the Gdynia city council. In 2011, he ran unsuccessfully for the Polish parliament from the lists of the Polish People's Party.

== Personal life ==
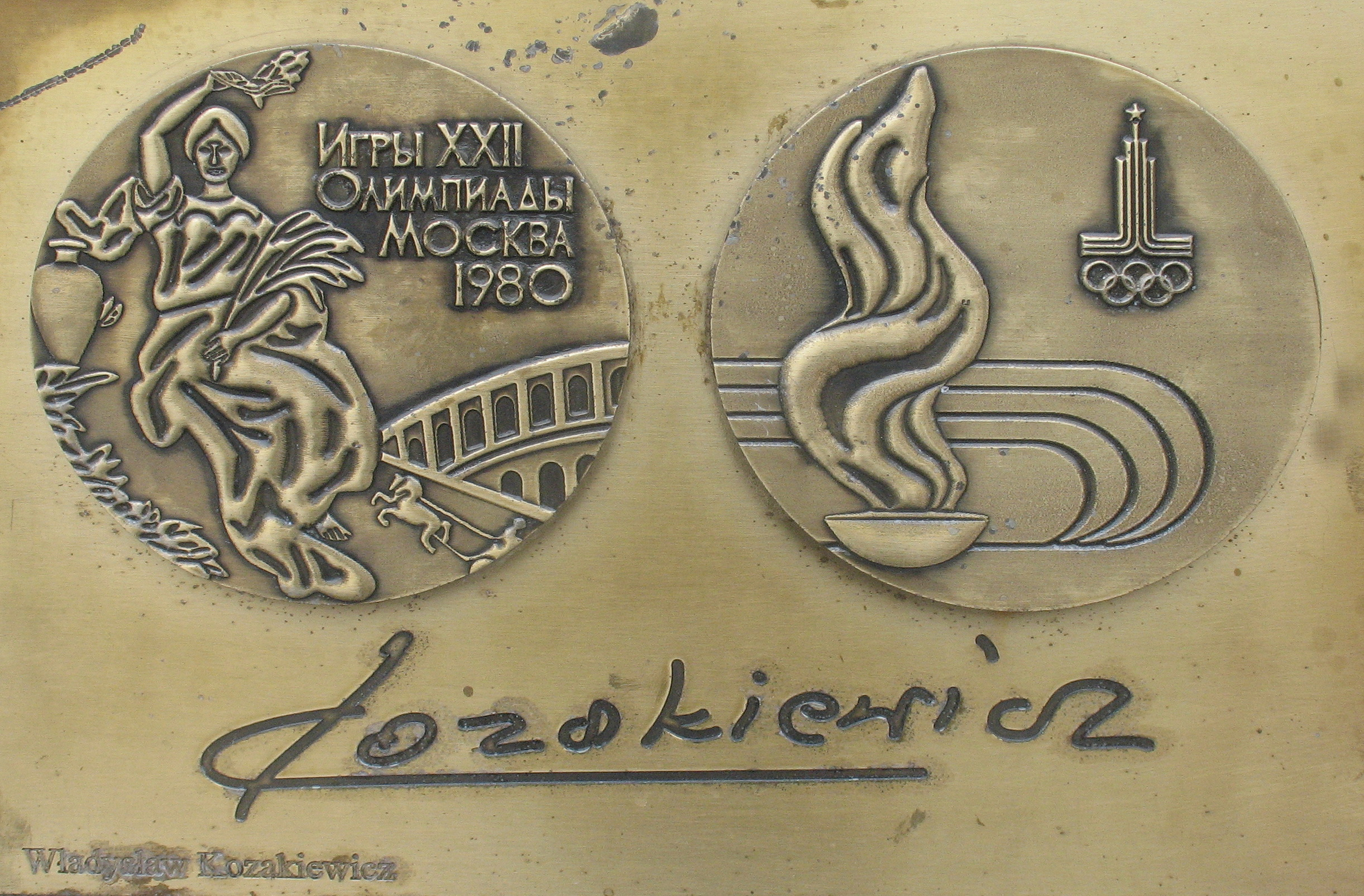
Copy of W. Kozakiewicz medal and autograph in Sports Star Avenue in Dziwnów

Since 1977 he has been married to Anna Kozakiewicz, a former swimmer. They have two daughters Katarzyna (b. 1979) and Małgorzata (b. 1983). In December 1986, he settled in Bissendorf, Lower Saxony, northwestern Germany, where he lives to this day.

== International competitions ==
Year	Competition	Venue	Position	Notes
Representing Poland
1974	European Championships	Rome, Italy	2nd	5.35 m
1975	European Indoor Championships	Katowice, Poland	3rd	5.30 m
1976	Olympic Games	Montreal, Canada	11th	5.25 m
1977	European Indoor Championships	San Sebastián, Spain	1st	5.51 m
1977	Universiade	Sofia, Bulgaria	1st	5.55 m
1977	World Cup	Düsseldorf, West Germany	2nd	5.55 m
1978	European Indoor Championships	Milan, Italy	5th	5.40 m
1978	European Championships	Prague, Czechoslovakia	4th	5.45 m
1979	European Indoor Championships	Vienna, Austria	1st	5.58 m
1979	Universiade	Mexico City, Mexico	1st	5.60 m
1980	European Indoor Championships	Sindelfingen, West Germany	4th	5.50 m
1980	Olympic Games	Moscow, Soviet Union	1st	5.78 m
1982	European Indoor Championships	Milan, Italy	3rd	5.60 m
1983	European Indoor Championships	Budapest, Hungary	9th	5.30 m
1983	World Championships	Helsinki, Finland	8th	5.40 m
1984	Friendship Games	Moscow, Soviet Union	6th	5.40 m

== Season bests ==
- 1969 – 3.85
- 1971 – 4.65
- 1972 – 5.02
- 1973 – 5.35
- 1974 – 5.38
- 1975 – 5.60
- 1976 – 5.62
- 1977 – 5.66
- 1978 – 5.62
- 1979 – 5.61
- 1980 – 5.78
- 1981 – 5.62
- 1982 – 5.60
- 1983 – 5.62
- 1984 – 5.70
- 1985 – 5.55i
- 1986 – 5.70
- 1987 – 5.65
- 1988 – 5.55
- 1989 – 5.50

== See also ==
- 1968 Olympics Black Power salute

Records
Preceded by (United States) David Roberts	Men's Pole Vault World Record Holder; 11 May 1980 – 29 June 1980	Succeeded by (France) Thierry Vigneron
Preceded by (France) Philippe Houvion	Men's Pole Vault World Record Holder; 30 July 1980 – 20 June 1981	Succeeded by (France) Thierry Vigneron
Sporting positions
Preceded by (United States) Dave Roberts	Men's Pole Vault Best Year Performance; 1977	Succeeded by (United States) Mike Tully
Preceded by (France) Patrick Abada (France) Philippe Houvion	Men's Pole Vault Best Year Performance; 1980	Succeeded by (Soviet Union) Vladimir Polyakov
