= Athletics in France =

Athletics in France is governed by Fédération française d'athlétisme founded on 20 November 1920.

== World records ==
Event	Performance	Athlete	Venue	Date
Pole vault	3.69	Fernand Gonder	(France) Paris	23 June 1904
Pole vault	3.74	Fernand Gonder	(France) Bordeaux	6 August 1905
10,000 metres	30:58:8	Jean Bouin	(France) Paris	16 November 1911
Hours	19.219 km	Jean Bouin	(Sweden) Stockholm	6 July 1913
20 km race walk	1:37:57	Émile Anthoine	(France) Paris	13 July 1913
800 metres	1:50:6	Séraphin Martin	(France) Paris	14 July 1928
1500 metres	3:49:2	Jules Ladoumègue	(France) Paris	5 October 1930
100 metres	10:0	Roger Bambuck	(United States) Sacramento	20 June 1968
110 metres hurdles	13:0	Guy Drut	(Germany) Berlin	22 August 1975
Pole vault	5.77 m 5.82 m 5.91 m	Philippe Houvion; Pierre Quinon; Thierry Vigneron	(France) Paris (Germany) Cologne (Italy) Rome	17 July 1980; 28 August 1983; 31 August 1984
4 x 100 metres relay	37:79	Max Morinière; Daniel Sangouma; Jean-Charles Trouabal; Bruno Marie-Rose	(Croatia) Split	1 September 1990
Pole vault	6.16 m	Renaud Lavillenie	(Ukraine) Donetsk	15 February 2014
50 kilometres race walk	3:32:33	Yohann Diniz	(Switzerland) Zurich	15 August 2014

== All-time top lists ==
=== Pole vault ===
Men

#	Athlete	Born	Performance	Venue	Date
1	Renaud Lavillenie	1986	6.16 m (i)	(Ukraine) Donetsk	15 February 2014
2	Jean Galfione	1971	6.00 m (i)	(Japan) Maebashi	6 March 1999
3	Romain Mesnil	1977	5.95 m	(France) Castres	6 August 2003
3	Thibaut Collet	1999	5.95 m	(France) Grenoble	19 June 2024
5	Philippe Collet	1963	5.94 m (i)	(France) Grenoble	10 March 1990
6	Thierry Vigneron	1960	5.91 m	(Italy) Rome	31 August 1984
6	Baptiste Thiery	2001	5.91 m (i)	(France) Clermont-Ferrand	28 February 2025
8	Ferenc Salbert	1963	5.90 m (i)	(France) Grenoble	14 March 1987
8	Pierre Quinon	1962	5.90 m	(France) Nice	16 July 1985
10	Axel Chapelle	1995	5.88 m (i)	(France) Clermont-Ferrand	25 February 2018

Women

#	Athlete	Born	Performance	Venue	Date
1	Ninon Guillon-Romarin	1995	4.75 m	Monaco	20 July 2018
2	Marion Fiack	1992	4.71 m (i)	(France) Aubiere	10 January 2015
2	Margot Chevrier	1999	4.71 m	(France) Paris	9 June 2023
2	Marie-Julie Bonnin	2001	4.71 m (i)	(France) Roubaix	15 February 2025
5	Vanessa Boslak	1982	4.70 m	(Spain) Málaga	28 June 2006
6	Marion Lotout	1989	4.60 m	(France) Grenoble	12 June 2013
7	Alix Dehaynain	1997	4.53 m (i)	(France) Rouen	24 February 2024
8	Elina Giallurachis	2001	4.51 m	(France) Pessac	13 July 2022
9	Marion Buisson	1988	4.50 m	(France) Albi	25 July 2008
10	Marie Poissonnier	1979	4.46 m	(France) Saint-Étienne	13 July 2002
10	Albane Dordain	1998	4.46 m (i)	(France) Rouen	5 March 2022

== See also ==
- Fédération française d'athlétisme
- French records in athletics
