= Tapani Haapakoski =

Finnish pole vaulter (born 1953)

Jouni Tapani ("Tapsa") Haapakoski (born 14 June 1953 in Ylivieska, Oulu) is a retired Finnish pole vaulter.

He became Finnish champion in 1976.

His personal best jump was 5.55 metres, achieved in July 1980 in Raahe.

== Achievements ==
Year	Competition	Venue	Position	Notes
1976	Olympic Games	Montreal, Canada	15th	5.20 m
1977	European Indoor Championships	San Sebastián, Spain	8th	5.00 m
1978	European Indoor Championships	Milan, Italy	–	NM
1978	European Championships	Prague, Czechoslovakia	10th	5.30 m
1979	European Indoor Championships	Vienna, Austria	–	NM
1980	Olympic Games	Moscow, Soviet Union	9th	5.45 m
1981	European Indoor Championships	Grenoble, France	15th	5.25 m
1983	World Championships	Helsinki, Finland	–	NM
