= Leland Stanford Scott =

American pole vaulter

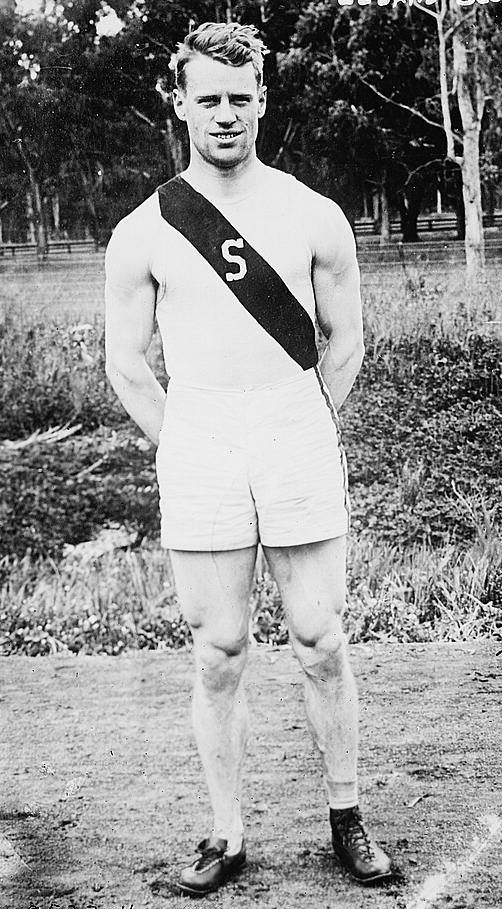
Leland Stanford Scott (c. 1910)

Leland Stanford Scott, Sr. (September 13, 1887 - March 19, 1979) set the Amateur Athletic Union record in the pole vault at a meet between Stanford University and Colorado State University on May 27, 1910. He cleared 12 feet 10 7/8 inches (3.934 m). In 1912 he set the intercollegiate record at 12 feet 10 3/15 inches (3.917 m).

== Biography ==
He set the Amateur Athletic Union record in the pole vault at a meet between Stanford University and Colorado State University on May 27, 1910.

In 1912 he had an appendix removed at Pablola Hospital.

He married Maria Ann McHenry around 1915 and had a son, Leland Stanford Scott, Jr. (1917–1995). By 1918 he was working for the Hall-Scott Motor Car Company and living in Piedmont, California.

He died on March 19, 1979, in Oakland, California.

== See also ==
- Men's pole vault world record progression for the International Association of Athletics Federations
