= David Roberts (pole vaulter) =

American pole vaulter (born 1951)

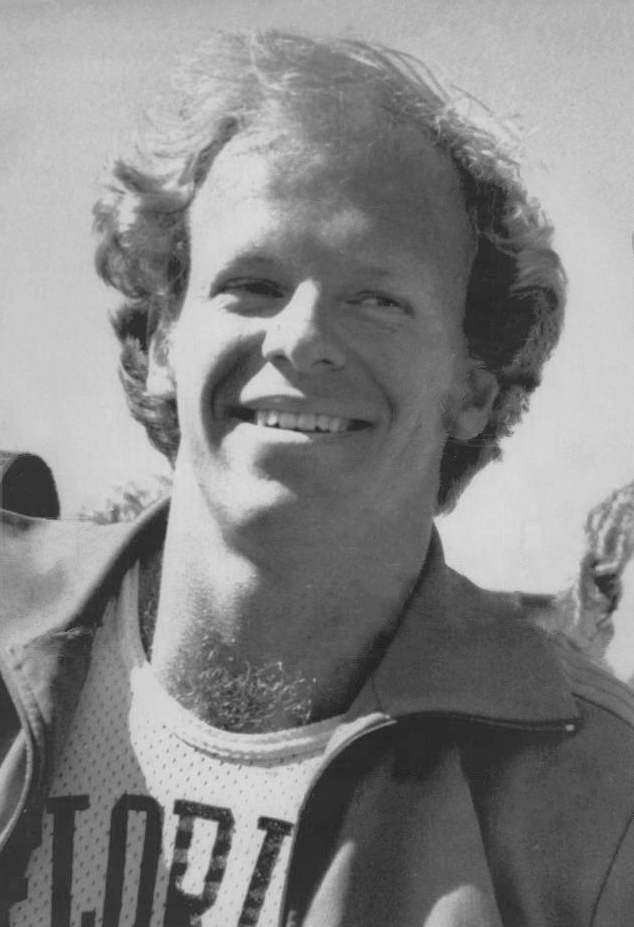
- Roberts in 1976

Personal information
- Born: July 23, 1951 (age 75) Stillwater, Oklahoma, U.S.
- Education: Rice University
- Height: 188 cm (6 ft 2 in)
- Weight: 81 kg (179 lb)

Sport
- Sport: Athletics
- Event: Pole vault
- Club: FTC, Gainesville

Achievements and titles
- Personal best: 5.70 m (1976)
Medal record
Representing the United States
Olympic Games
Bronze medal – third place	1976 Montreal	Pole vault
Pan American Games
Silver medal – second place	1971 Cali	Pole vault

David Luther Roberts (born July 23, 1951) is an American retired pole vaulter and practicing physician. He won a silver medal at the 1971 Pan America Games and a bronze at the 1976 Olympics. Domestically he held the NCAA title in 1971–1973 and the AAU title in 1972 and 1974. He set two world records, in 1975 and 1976.

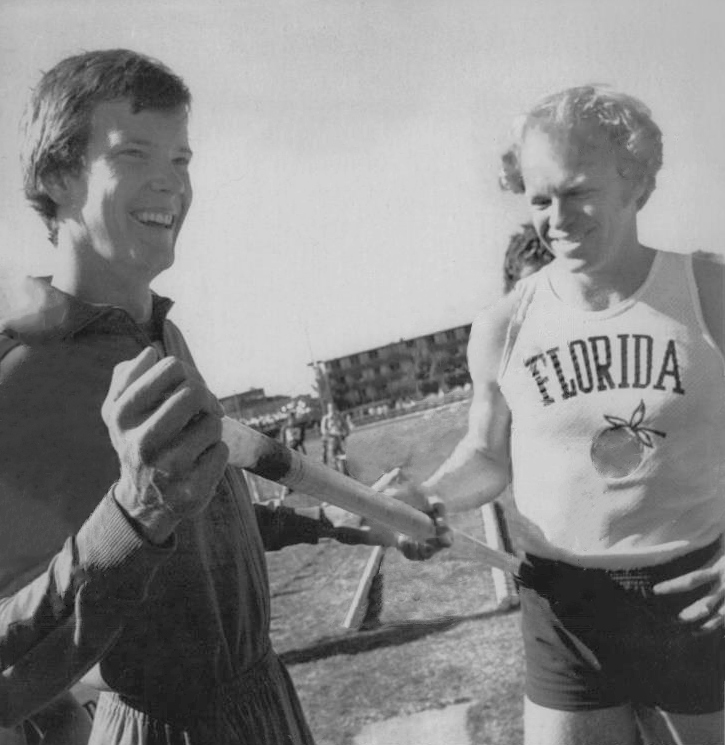
Roberts (right) returns a borrowed pole to Bell at the 1976 Olympic Trials

During the 1976 U.S. Olympic Trials, Roberts broke his pole. His rival and then world record holder Earl Bell lent him his pole, and Roberts won the Trials with a new world record of 5.70 m. At the Olympics, he and two other athletes cleared 5.50 m. He passed at 5.55 m and his rivals failed to clear that height. He was unable to clear the next height at 5.60 m, as it had begun to rain. He finished third on the attempts count.

Roberts graduated from Rice University in 1974. He graduated from the University of Florida College of Medicine in 1979, and is currently an assistant clinical professor of emergency medicine at that institution.

Records
Preceded by (United States) Bob Seagren	Men's Pole Vault World Record Holder; March 28, 1975 – May 29, 1976	Succeeded by (United States) Earl Bell
Preceded by (United States) Earl Bell	Men's Pole Vault World Record Holder; June 22, 1976 – May 11, 1980	Succeeded by (Poland) Władysław Kozakiewicz
Sporting positions
Preceded by (United States) Steve Smith	Men's Pole Vault Best Year Performance; 1975–1976	Succeeded by (Poland) Władysław Kozakiewicz
