= Thierry Vigneron =

French pole vaulter (born 1960)

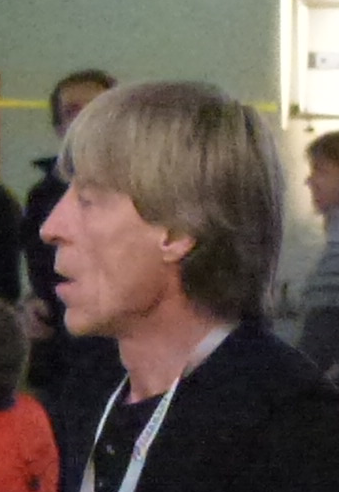
- Thierry Vigneron in 2012

Personal information
- Born: 9 March 1960 (age 66)
Medal record
Men's Athletics
Representing France
Olympic Games
Bronze medal – third place	1984 Los Angeles	Pole vault
World Championships
Silver medal – second place	1987 Rome	Pole vault
World Indoor Championships
Silver medal – second place	1985 Paris	Pole vault
Bronze medal – third place	1987 Indianapolis	Pole vault
European Indoor Championships
Gold medal – first place	1981 Grenoble	Pole vault
Gold medal – first place	1984 Gothenburg	Pole vault
Gold medal – first place	1987 Liévin	Pole vault
Bronze medal – third place	1990 Glasgow	Pole vault
Summer Universiade
Silver medal – second place	1983 Edmonton	Pole vault
Mediterranean Games
Silver medal – second place	1993 Languedoc-Roussillon	Pole vault

Thierry Vigneron (born 9 March 1960 in Gennevilliers, Hauts-de-Seine) is a retired French pole vaulter. In the 1980s, he was among the world's leading pole vaulters. He broke the world record in the event four times and was the last man to hold the world record (for only a few minutes in August 1984) before Sergey Bubka, who would hold on to it almost 30 years until February 2014.

== Biography ==
Vigneron burst onto the world stage by unexpectedly beating the 5.72 m outdoor world record of Poland's Władysław Kozakiewicz with a jump of 5.75 m on 1 June 1980. Vigneron equaled his own outdoor world record of 5.75 m on 29 June 1980. Although Vigneron lost his outdoor world record to another Frenchman, Philippe Houvion, on 17 July 1980, he was one of the favorites at the 1980 Summer Olympics. However, Vigneron could not rise to the challenge; he could only finish in 7th position at 5.45 m. The 1980 Olympics pole vault title was won by Kozakiewicz, who also reclaimed the outdoor world record from Houvion with a jump of 5.78 m in that Olympic final. On 20 June 1981 Vigneron reclaimed the outdoor world record with a 5.80 m jump, only to lose it to the Soviet Union's Vladimir Polyakov six days later.

After yet another Frenchman, Pierre Quinon, raised the outdoor world record to 5.82 m on 28 August 1983, Vigneron vaulted to another outdoor world record again with 5.83 m on 1 September 1983. This record remained unbeaten until 26 May 1984, when Sergey Bubka cleared 5.85 m just weeks before the 1984 Summer Olympics in Los Angeles, in which Vigneron took the bronze medal while Bubka was absent due to the Soviet-led boycott. On 31 August 1984, less than three weeks after the 1984 Olympics had ended, Bubka beat Vigneron in a memorable contest in Rome in which the Frenchman briefly retook the outdoor world record with 5.91 m and the Ukrainian cleared 5.94 m immediately afterwards. It was the last time that anyone other than Bubka held the outdoor world record. (Bubka continued to hold the outdoor world record until 17 September 2020 with a 6.14m mark). However, Bubka's indoor world record of 6.15m was previously beaten by another Frenchman, Renaud Lavillenie, who vaulted 6.16m, on 15 February 2014. Ironically, both marks were set in Donetsk, Ukraine, which is Bubka's hometown.)

This was the high-water mark of Vigneron's career. Despite a bronze medal at the 1984 Summer Olympics, a silver medal at the World Indoor Championships in 1985, a bronze medal at the World Indoor Championships in 1987, and a silver medal at the 1987 World Championships in Rome, Vigneron was never able again to match Bubka who brought the outdoor world record to 6.14 m.

Vigneron retired from pole vaulting in 1996.

== International competitions ==
Year	Competition	Venue	Position	Notes
Representing France
1979	European Indoor Championships	Vienna, Austria	–	NM
1979	European Junior Championships	Bydgoszcz, Poland	3rd	5.40 m
1980	European Indoor Championships	Sindelfingen, West Germany	8th	5.40 m
1980	Olympic Games	Moscow, Soviet Union	7th	5.45 m
1981	European Indoor Championships	Grenoble, France	1st	5.70 m
1981	Universiade	Bucharest, Romania	4th	5.60 m
1982	European Championships	Athens, Greece	5th	5.50 m
1983	European Indoor Championships	Budapest, Hungary	–	NM
1983	Universiade	Edmonton, Canada	2nd	5.60 m
1983	World Championships	Helsinki, Finland	8th	5.40 m
1984	European Indoor Championships	Gothenburg, Sweden	1st	5.85 m
1984	Olympic Games	Los Angeles, United States	3rd	5.60 m
1985	World Indoor Games	Paris, France	2nd	5.70 m
1985	European Indoor Championships	Piraeus, Greece	–	NM
1986	European Championships	Stuttgart, West Germany	1st (q)	5.50 m^{1}
1987	European Indoor Championships	Liévin, France	1st	5.85 m
1987	World Indoor Championships	Indianapolis, United States	3rd	5.80 m
1987	World Championships	Rome, Italy	2nd	5.80 m
1988	Olympic Games	Seoul, South Korea	5th	5.70 m
1990	European Indoor Championships	Glasgow, United Kingdom	3rd	5.70 m
1990	European Championships	Split, Yugoslavia	6th (q)	5.30 m^{1}
1991	World Championships	Tokyo, Japan	8th	5.60 m
1993	World Indoor Championships	Toronto, Canada	6th (q)	5.50 m^{1}
1993	Mediterranean Games	Narbonne, France	2nd	5.50 m

^{1}No mark in the final

== See also ==
- French all-time top lists - Pole vault
- Men's pole vault world record progression

Records
Preceded by (Poland) Władysław Kozakiewicz	Men's Pole Vault World Record Holder; 1 June 1980 – 17 July 1980	Succeeded by (France) Philippe Houvion
Preceded by (Poland) Władysław Kozakiewicz	Men's Pole Vault World Record Holder; 20 June 1981 – 26 June 1981	Succeeded by (Soviet Union) Vladimir Polyakov
Preceded by (France) Pierre Quinon	Men's Pole Vault World Record Holder; 1 September 1983 – 26 May 1984	Succeeded by (Soviet Union) Sergey Bubka
Preceded by (Soviet Union) Sergey Bubka	Men's Pole Vault World Record Holder; 31 August 1984 – 31 August 1984	Succeeded by (Soviet Union) Sergey Bubka
Sporting positions
Preceded by (United States) Dave Volz (France) Jean-Michel Bellot	Men's Pole Vault Best Year Performance; 1983	Succeeded by (Soviet Union) Sergey Bubka
