= David Volz =

American pole vaulter (born 1962)

Personal information
- Born: May 2, 1962 (age 64) Long Beach, California, United States
Medal record
Men's Athletics
Representing the United States
Summer Universiade
Bronze medal – third place	1985 Kobe	Pole Vault

David Alan Volz (born May 2, 1962) is a retired American pole vaulter, who finished fifth at the 1992 Summer Olympics in Barcelona. In addition, he won a bronze medal at the 1985 Summer Universiade. With 5.75 meters in 1982, Volz and Jean-Michel Bellot shared the number one spot on the top performers list that year.

His name is memorialized for creating a technique, now illegal, of steadying or even replacing the bar while still in mid-air to prevent it from falling off, known as "Volzing".

He now resides in Bloomington, Indiana, where he is vice president of Cook, Inc. He is married to Marci Endris Volz, who teaches at Bloomington High School South. His three sons, Drake, Drew, and Deakin all pole vaulted for Bloomington High School South.

Sporting positions
Preceded by (Soviet Union) Vladimir Polyakov	Men's Pole Vault Best Year Performance alongside Jean-Michel Bellot (FRA); 1982	Succeeded by (France) Thierry Vigneron
