= Philippe Houvion =

French pole vaulter (born 1957)

Personal information
- Born: 5 October 1957 (age 68) Briey, France

Sport
- Sport: Track and field
Medal record
Representing France
Mediterranean Games
Gold medal – first place	1979 Split	Pole vault
Summer Universiade
Silver medal – second place	1979 Mexico City	Pole vault
Bronze medal – third place	1981 Bucharest	Pole vault

Philippe Houvion (born 5 October 1957) is a retired French pole vaulter. On 17 July 1980 in Paris, Houvion jumped 5.77 metres, beating the world record of Thierry Vigneron by two centimetres. The record only lasted until 30 July 1980, when Władysław Kozakiewicz of Poland jumped 5.78 metres in Moscow. Houvion was born in Briey, Meurthe-et-Moselle. He was coached by his father, Maurice Houvion, after being talked out of a career in football.

== International competitions ==
Year	Competition	Venue	Position	Notes
1977	European Indoor Championships	San Sebastián, Spain	–	NM
1977	Universiade	Sofia, Bulgaria	6th	5.20 m
1978	European Indoor Championships	Milan, Italy	8th	5.20 m
1978	European Championships	Prague, Czechoslovakia	6th	5.40 m
1979	European Indoor Championships	Vienna, Austria	7th	5.40 m
1979	Universiade	Mexico City, Mexico	2nd	5.60 m
1979	Mediterranean Games	Split, Yugoslavia	1st	5.30 m
1980	Olympic Games	Moscow, Soviet Union	4th	5.65 m
1981	European Indoor Championships	Grenoble, France	6th	5.55 m
1981	Universiade	Bucharest, Romania	3rd	5.65 m
1984	European Indoor Championships	Gothenburg, Sweden	8th	5.30 m
1985	European Indoor Championships	Piraeus, Greece	12th	5.30 m
1986	European Indoor Championships	Madrid, Spain	6th	5.30 m
1986	Goodwill Games	Moscow, Soviet Union	8th	5.40 m

Records
Preceded by (France) Thierry Vigneron	Men's Pole Vault World Record Holder; July 17, 1980 – July 30, 1980	Succeeded by (Poland) Władysław Kozakiewicz
Sporting positions
Preceded by (United States) Mike Tully	Men's Pole Vault Best Year Performance alongside (France) Patrick Abada; 1979	Succeeded by (Poland) Władysław Kozakiewicz
