= Volzing =

Illegal pole vaulting technique

Volzing is a now illegal technique in the pole vault once popularized by its namesake, American David Volz. For a period of time during his career, until rules were written to outlaw it, Volz and later others who learned the technique, would be able to steady the bar, or even replace the bar back to its pegs after they had dislodged it all while still in mid air. It was outlawed by USATF Rule 183 5d; IAAF Rule 183 2d; NCAA 6-2b; NFHS Rule 7-5-29g.
