= Patrick Abada =

French pole vaulter (born 1954)

Personal information
- Born: 20 March 1954 (age 72) Paris, France
- Height: 189 cm (6 ft 2 in)
- Weight: 80 kg (176 lb; 12 st 8 lb)

Sport
- Sport: Track and field
Medal record
Representing France
European Indoor Championships
Bronze medal – third place	1980 Sindelfingen	Pole vault
Summer Universiade
Bronze medal – third place	1979 Mexico City	Pole vault

Patrick Abada (born 20 March 1954) is a retired French pole vaulter and Olympian, having competed in the 1976 Summer Olympics. His best vault was one of 5.70 m, made on 26 August 1983, in Brussels. As of August 2001, that mark was the 126th best pole vault of all time. He represented France in pole vaulting 25 times between 1973 and 1985.

== International competitions ==
Year	Competition	Venue	Position	Notes
Representing France
1973	European Indoor Championships	Rotterdam, Netherlands	6th	5.20 m
1973	European Junior Championships	Duisburg, West Germany	–	NM
1974	European Championships	Rome, Italy	9th	5.10 m
1976	Olympic Games	Montreal, Canada	4th	5.45 m
1978	European Championships	Prague, Czechoslovakia	9th	5.30 m
1979	European Indoor Championships	Vienna, Austria	–	NM
1979	World Cup	Montreal, Canada	2nd	5.45 m^{1}
1979	Universiade	Mexico City, Mexico	3rd	5.55 m
1980	European Indoor Championships	Sindelfingen, West Germany	3rd	5.55 m
1983	European Indoor Championships	Budapest, Hungary	3rd	5.55 m
1983	Mediterranean Games	Casablanca, Morocco	1st	5.55 m
1983	World Championships	Helsinki, Finland	6th	5.55 m
1985	World Indoor Games	Paris, France	4th	5.50 m

^{1}Representing Europe

== Current work ==
He is currently president of the athletics section of the Racing Club de France.

== Personal life ==
Abada is from an Algerian family of Turkish origin.

== Notes ==
Sporting positions
Preceded by (United States) Mike Tully	Men's Pole Vault Best Year Performance alongside (France) Philippe Houvion; 1979	Succeeded by (Poland) Władysław Kozakiewicz
