= Mike Tully =

American pole vaulter (born 1956)

Personal information
- Full name: Michael Scott Tully
- Born: October 21, 1956 (age 70) Long Beach, California, U.S.
Medal record
Men's athletics
Representing United States
Olympic Games
Silver medal – second place	1984 Los Angeles	Pole vault
Pan American Games
Gold medal – first place	1983 Caracas	Pole vault
Gold medal – first place	1987 Indianapolis	Pole vault

Michael Scott Tully (born October 21, 1956) is an American pole vaulter. He represented the United States twice in the Olympics, earning a silver in 1984, and held the American pole vault record from 1984 to 1985.

== Early career ==
Born in Long Beach, California, he went to college at UCLA and was the NCAA champion in the pole vault in 1978 with a height of 5.53 metres. He won three national titles in 1977, 1979 and 1986. He also took the AAA Championships in 1976 and 1979 and the French championship in 1977.

He enjoyed great success at the Mt. SAC Relays, winning four pole vault titles, each at a meet record height. His last victory came at a height exactly one foot higher than the first. He also holds the distinction of being the first vaulter to clear 18 feet in the competition. His efforts earned him the honor of induction into the Mt. SAC relays hall of fame in 1994.

== International career ==
Tully won the first two World Cup competitions, the 1977 and 1979 IAAF World Cup. He qualified for the 1980 U.S. Olympic team but was unable to compete due to the 1980 Summer Olympics boycott. Tully did however receive one of 461 Congressional Gold Medals created especially for the spurned athletes. He competed at the 1983 World Championships without registering a valid mark. In a one-month period in 1984 he raised the American record three times by a total of almost three inches. He concluded the season with a silver medal at the 1984 Olympic Games. He took the American record from Jeff Buckingham, but his national record was broken in 1985.

At the Pan American Games he won gold medals in 1983 and 1987 Pan American Games, both times with championship records, first 5.45 metres then 5.71 metres. He also finished fourth at the 1986 Goodwill Games.

Sporting positions
Preceded by Władysław Kozakiewicz	Season's best performance, men's pole vault 1978	Succeeded by Philippe Houvion; Patrick Abada
