= Viktor Spasov =

Soviet pole vaulter

Personal information
- Born: 19 July 1959 Kyiv, Soviet Union
- Died: 15 August 2005 (aged 46) Kyiv, Ukraine

Sport
- Sport: Track and field
Medal record
Representing Soviet Union
European Indoor Championships
Gold medal – first place	1982 Milan	Pole vault
Summer Universiade
Gold medal – first place	1987 Zagreb	Pole vault

Viktor Spasov (19 July 1959 – 15 August 2005) was a pole vaulter, who represented the Soviet Union during his career. He set his personal best (5.70 metres) on 7 March 1982 at the European Indoor Championships in Milan, earning him the gold medal.

== Achievements ==
Year	Competition	Venue	Position	Notes
1982	European Indoor Championships	Milan, Italy	1st	5.70
1987	Summer Universiade	Zagreb, Yugoslavia	1st	
