= Sergey Kulibaba =

Soviet pole vaulter

Personal information
- Nationality: Soviet
- Born: 24 July 1959 (age 66)

Sport
- Sport: Athletics
- Event: Pole vault

Sergey Kulibaba (born 24 July 1959) is a former Soviet pole vaulter. He competed in the men's pole vault at the 1980 Summer Olympics.
