= Konstantin Volkov (pole vaulter) =

Russian pole vaulter (born 1960)

Personal information
- Born: 28 February 1960 (age 66) Irkutsk
- Children: Matvei Volkov

Sport
- Sport: Athletics
- Event: Pole Vault

Achievements and titles
- Personal best: 5.85 m (19 ft 2 1/4 in)
Medal record
Representing Soviet Union
Olympic Games
Silver medal – second place	1980 Moscow	Pole vault
World Championships
Silver medal – second place	1983 Helsinki	Pole vault
European Indoor Championships
Gold medal – first place	1980 Sindelfingen	Pole vault
Silver medal – second place	1979 Vienna	Pole vault
Silver medal – second place	1982 Milan	Pole vault
Universiade
Gold medal – first place	1981 Bucharest	Pole vault
Gold medal – first place	1983 Edmonton	Pole vault

Konstantin Yuryevich Volkov (Russian: Константин Юрьевич Волков; born 28 February 1960 in Irkutsk) is a retired pole vaulter.

== Biography ==
He represented the USSR. In 1980 he won the European Indoor Championships with a championship record of 5.60 metres (which was beaten the following year). He also won an Olympic silver medal at the 1980 Summer Olympics in Moscow. In 1983 he won a silver medal at the inaugural World Championships in 1983, and the next year he jumped 5.85 metres, his personal best.

He is the father of the Belarusian pole vaulter Matvei Volkov.

== International competitions ==
Year	Competition	Venue	Position	Notes
Representing the Soviet Union
1979	European Indoor Championships	Vienna, Austria	2nd	5.45 m
1979	Universiade	Mexico City, Mexico	6th	5.40 m
1979	World Cup	Montreal, Canada	3rd	5.30 m
1980	European Indoor Championships	Sindelfingen, West Germany	1st	5.60 m
1980	Olympic Games	Moscow, Soviet Union	2nd	5.65 m
1981	Universiade	Bucharest, Romania	1st	5.75 m
1981	World Cup	Rome, Italy	1st	5.70 m
1982	European Indoor Championships	Milan, Italy	2nd	5.65 m
1983	Universiade	Edmonton, Canada	1st	5.65 m
1983	World Championships	Helsinki, Finland	2nd	5.60 m
1984	Friendship Games	Moscow, Soviet Union	1st	5.80 m
