= Jean-Michel Bellot =

French pole vaulter (born 1953)

Medal record

Men's athletics

Representing France

European Indoor Championships
Bronze medal – third place	1973 Rotterdam	Pole vault
Bronze medal – third place	1981 Grenoble	Pole vault

Jean-Michel Bellot (born 6 December 1953) is a retired male pole vaulter from France. He was born in Neuilly-sur-Seine, Hauts-de-Seine.

== Achievements ==
Year	Competition	Venue	Position	Notes
1971	European Championships	Helsinki, Finland	13th (q)	4.90 m
1972	European Indoor Championships	Grenoble, France	–	NM
1973	European Indoor Championships	Rotterdam, Netherlands	3rd	5.30 m
1975	European Indoor Championships	Katowice, Poland	9th	5.20 m
1976	Olympic Games	Montreal, Canada	7th	5.40 m
1977	European Indoor Championships	San Sebastián, Spain	–	NM
1979	Mediterranean Games	Split, Yugoslavia	2nd	5.30 m
1980	Olympic Games	Moscow, Soviet Union	5th	5.60 m
1981	European Indoor Championships	Grenoble, France	3rd	5.65 m
1981	World Cup	Rome, Italy	2nd	5.55 m^{1}
1982	European Indoor Championships	Milan, Italy	6th	5.40 m
1982	European Championships	Athens, Greece	–	NM

^{1}Representing Europe

Sporting positions
Preceded by (Soviet Union) Vladimir Polyakov	Men's Pole Vault Best Year Performance alongside Dave Volz (USA); 1982	Succeeded by (France) Thierry Vigneron
