= Men's pole vault world record progression =

The first world record in the men's pole vault was recognized by the International Association of Athletics Federations in 1912.

As of April 20, 2024, 80 world records have been ratified by the IAAF (now World Athletics) in the event. Since 2000, World Athletics makes no distinction between indoor and outdoor settings when establishing pole vault world records. This new rule was not applied retroactively. The introduction in the early 1950s of flexible vaulting poles made from composites such as fiberglass or carbon fiber allowed vaulters to achieve greater height. The present record of 6.31 m (20 ft 8 1/4 in) was set by Armand Duplantis, competing at the Mondo Classic in Uppsala, Sweden.

== Record progression ==
This table lists jumps ratified by World Athletics (formerly the International Association of Athletics Federations (IAAF)) as world records, which includes tying or surpassing the existing record.

Ratified
Not ratified
Ratified but later rescinded
Pending ratification

Mark	Athlete	Nation	Venue	Date	# (Note: The numbered occurrence of the athlete breaking the world record, in other words "#7" would indicate the 7th time the athlete broke the world record.)
3.15 m (10 ft 4 in)	Francis Temple	United Kingdom	Woolwich	October 6, 1849	1
3.21 m (10 ft 6 1/4 in)	Robert Mitchell	United Kingdom	London	June 19, 1868	1
3.225 m (10 ft 6 3/4 in)	Edwin Woodburn	United Kingdom	Newton	August 31, 1872	1
3.225 m (10 ft 6 3/4 in)	Edwin Woodburn	United Kingdom	Lancaster	June 2, 1873	2
3.225 m (10 ft 6 3/4 in)	William Kelsey	United Kingdom	Sheffield	July 7, 1873	1
3.225 m (10 ft 6 3/4 in)	John Wigfull	United Kingdom	Sheffield	July 7, 1873	1
3.225 m (10 ft 6 3/4 in)	Edwin Woodburn	United Kingdom	London	March 30, 1874	3
3.225 m (10 ft 6 3/4 in)	John Wigfull	United Kingdom	Sheffield	July 5, 1875	2
3.38 m (11 ft 1 in)	A. Hammond	United Kingdom	Bury St.Edmunds	March 30, 1876	1
3.38 m (11 ft 1 in)	Edwin Woodburn	United Kingdom	Ulverston	July 21, 1876	4
3.42 m (11 ft 2 1/2 in)	Thomas Ray	United Kingdom	Ulverston	September 19, 1879	1
3.43 m (11 ft 3 in)	Thomas Ray	United Kingdom	Birmingham	July 16, 1881	2
3.455 m (11 ft 4 in)	Thomas Ray	United Kingdom	Bradford	August 12, 1882	3
3.455 m (11 ft 4 in)	Thomas Ray	United Kingdom	Nottingham	June 16, 1883	4
3.465 m (11 ft 4 1/4 in)	Thomas Ray	United Kingdom	Preston	August 18, 1883	5
3.48 m (11 ft 5 in)	Thomas Ray	United Kingdom	Grasmere	August 20, 1885	6
3.485 m (11 ft 5 in)	Thomas Ray	United Kingdom	Whitehaven	August 13, 1886	7
3.505 m (11 ft 5 3/4 in)	Thomas Ray	United Kingdom	Grasmere	August 18, 1887	8
3.52 m (11 ft 6 1/2 in)	Thomas Ray	United Kingdom	Whitehaven	August 19, 1887	9
3.53 m (11 ft 6 3/4 in)	Ernest Stones	United Kingdom	Southport	June 2, 1888	1
3.555 m (11 ft 7 3/4 in)	Thomas Ray	United Kingdom	Barrow	September 22, 1888	10
3.57 m (11 ft 8 1/2 in)	Ernest Stones	United Kingdom	Grasmere	August 23, 1889	2
3.58 m (11 ft 8 3/4 in)	Richard Dickenson	United Kingdom	Kidderminster	July 4, 1891	1
3.62 m (11 ft 10 1/2 in)	Raymond Clapp	United States	Chicago	June 16, 1898	1
3.69 m (12 ft 1 1/4 in)	Norman Dole	United States	Berkeley	April 23, 1904	1
3.69 m (12 ft 1 1/4 in)	Fernand Gonder	France	Paris	June 26, 1904	1
3.74 m (12 ft 3 in)	Fernand Gonder	France	Gradignan	June 4, 1905	2
3.78 m (12 ft 4 3/4 in)	Leroy Samse	United States	Chicago	June 2, 1906	1
3.79 m (12 ft 5 in)	Walter Dray	United States	New Haven	May 18, 1907	1
3.82 m (12 ft 6 1/4 in)	Walter Dray	United States	Philadelphia	April 25, 1908	2
3.855 m (12 ft 7 3/4 in)	Alfred Gilbert	United States	Philadelphia	June 6, 1908	1
3.86 m (12 ft 7 3/4 in)	Alfred Gilbert	United States	New Haven	June 12, 1908	2
3.90 m (12 ft 9 1/2 in)	Walter Dray	United States	Danbury	June 13, 1908	3
3.91 m (12 ft 9 3/4 in)	Leland Scott	United States	Berkeley	April 30, 1910	1
3.93 m (12 ft 10 1/2 in)	Leland Scott	United States	Boulder	May 27, 1910	2
3.985 m (13 ft 3/4 in)	Robert Gardner	United States	Philadelphia	June 1, 1912	1
4.02 m (13 ft 2 1/4 in)	Marc Wright	United States	Cambridge, U.S.	June 8, 1912	1
4.09 m (13 ft 5 in)	Frank Foss	United States	Antwerp, Belgium	August 20, 1920	1
4.12 m (13 ft 6 in)	Charles Hoff	Norway	Copenhagen, Denmark	September 22, 1922	1
4.21 m (13 ft 9 1/2 in)	Charles Hoff	Norway	Copenhagen, Denmark	July 22, 1923	2
4.23 m (13 ft 10 1/2 in)	Charles Hoff	Norway	Oslo, Norway	August 13, 1925	3
4.25 m (13 ft 11 1/4 in)	Charles Hoff	Norway	Turku, Finland	September 27, 1925	4
4.27 m (14 ft 0 in)	Sabin Carr	United States	Philadelphia, U.S.	May 28, 1927	1
4.30 m (14 ft 1 1/4 in)	Lee Barnes	United States	Fresno, U.S.	April 28, 1928	1
4.37 m (14 ft 4 in)	William Graber	United States	Palo Alto, U.S.	July 16, 1932	1
4.39 m (14 ft 4 3/4 in)	Keith Brown	United States	Boston, U.S.	June 1, 1935	1
4.43 m (14 ft 6 1/4 in)	George Varoff	United States	Princeton, New Jersey, U.S.	July 4, 1936	1
4.54 m (14 ft 10 1/2 in)	Bill Sefton	United States	Los Angeles, U.S.	May 29, 1937	1
4.54 m (14 ft 10 1/2 in)	Earle Meadows	United States	Los Angeles, U.S.	May 29, 1937	1
4.60 m (15 ft 1 in)	Cornelius Warmerdam	United States	Fresno, U.S.	June 29, 1940	1
4.72 m (15 ft 5 3/4 in)	Cornelius Warmerdam	United States	Compton, U.S.	June 26, 1941	2
4.77 m (15 ft 7 3/4 in)	Cornelius Warmerdam	United States	Modesto, U.S.	May 23, 1942	3
4.78 m (15 ft 8 in)	Robert Gutowski	United States	Palo Alto, U.S.	April 27, 1957	1
4.80 m (15 ft 8 3/4 in)	Don Bragg	United States	Palo Alto, U.S.	July 2, 1960	1
4.83 m (15 ft 10 in)	George Davies	United States	Boulder, U.S.	May 20, 1961	1
4.89 m (16 ft 1/2 in)	John Uelses	United States	Santa Barbara, U.S.	March 31, 1962	1
4.93 m (16 ft 2 in)	Dave Tork	United States	Walnut, U.S.	April 28, 1962	1
4.94 m (16 ft 2 1/4 in)	Pentti Nikula	Finland	Kauhava, Finland	June 22, 1962	1
5.00 m (16 ft 4 3/4 in)	Brian Sternberg	United States	Philadelphia, U.S.	April 27, 1963	1
5.08 m (16 ft 8 in)	Brian Sternberg	United States	Compton, U.S.	June 7, 1963	2
5.13 m (16 ft 9 3/4 in)	John Pennel	United States	London, England	August 5, 1963	1
5.20 m (17 ft 1/2 in)	John Pennel	United States	Coral Gables, U.S.	August 24, 1963	2
5.23 m (17 ft 1 3/4 in)	Fred Hansen	United States	San Diego, U.S.	June 13, 1964	1
5.28 m (17 ft 3 3/4 in)	Fred Hansen	United States	Los Angeles, U.S.	July 25, 1964	2
5.32 m (17 ft 5 1/4 in)	Bob Seagren	United States	Fresno, U.S.	May 14, 1966	1
5.34 m (17 ft 6 in)	John Pennel	United States	Los Angeles, U.S.	July 23, 1966	3
5.36 m (17 ft 7 in)	Bob Seagren	United States	San Diego, U.S.	June 10, 1967	2
5.38 m (17 ft 7 3/4 in)	Paul Wilson	United States	Bakersfield, U.S.	June 23, 1967	1
5.41 m (17 ft 8 3/4 in) A	Bob Seagren	United States	Echo Summit, U.S.	September 12, 1968	3
5.44 m (17 ft 10 in)	John Pennel	United States	Sacramento, U.S.	June 21, 1969	4
5.45 m (17 ft 10 1/2 in)	Wolfgang Nordwig	East Germany	Berlin, Germany	June 17, 1970	1
5.46 m (17 ft 10 3/4 in)	Wolfgang Nordwig	East Germany	Turin, Italy	September 3, 1970	2
5.49 m (18 ft 0 in)	Christos Papanikolaou	Greece	Athens, Greece	October 24, 1970	1
5.51 m (18 ft 3/4 in)	Kjell Isaksson	Sweden	Austin, U.S.	April 8, 1972	1
5.54 m (18 ft 2 in)	Kjell Isaksson	Sweden	Los Angeles, U.S.	April 15, 1972	2
5.55 m (18 ft 2 1/2 in)	Kjell Isaksson	Sweden	Helsingborg, Sweden	June 12, 1972	3
5.63 m (18 ft 5 1/2 in)	Bob Seagren	United States	Eugene, U.S.	July 2, 1972	4
5.65 m (18 ft 6 1/4 in)	David Roberts	United States	Gainesville, U.S.	March 28, 1975	1
5.67 m (18 ft 7 in)	Earl Bell	United States	Wichita, U.S.	May 29, 1976	1
5.70 m (18 ft 8 1/4 in)	David Roberts	United States	Eugene, U.S.	June 22, 1976	2
5.72 m (18 ft 9 in)	Władysław Kozakiewicz	Poland	Milan, Italy	May 11, 1980	1
5.75 m (18 ft 10 1/4 in)	Thierry Vigneron	France	Paris, France	June 1, 1980	1
5.75 m (18 ft 10 1/4 in)	Thierry Vigneron	France	Lille, France	June 29, 1980	2
5.77 m (18 ft 11 in)	Philippe Houvion	France	Paris, France	July 17, 1980	1
5.78 m (18 ft 11 1/2 in)	Władysław Kozakiewicz	Poland	Moscow, Soviet Union	July 30, 1980	2
5.80 m (19 ft 1/4 in)	Thierry Vigneron	France	Mâcon, France	June 20, 1981	3
5.81 m (19 ft 1/2 in)	Vladimir Polyakov	Soviet Union	Tbilisi, Soviet Union	June 26, 1981	1
5.82 m (19 ft 1 in)	Pierre Quinon	France	Cologne, Germany	August 28, 1983	1
5.83 m (19 ft 1 1/2 in)	Thierry Vigneron	France	Rome, Italy	September 1, 1983	4
5.85 m (19 ft 2 1/4 in)	Sergey Bubka	Soviet Union	Bratislava, Czechoslovakia	May 26, 1984	1
5.88 m (19 ft 3 1/4 in)	Sergey Bubka	Soviet Union	Paris, France	June 2, 1984	2
5.90 m (19 ft 4 1/4 in)	Sergey Bubka	Soviet Union	London, England	July 13, 1984	3
5.91 m (19 ft 4 1/2 in)	Thierry Vigneron	France	Rome, Italy	August 31, 1984	5
5.94 m (19 ft 5 3/4 in)	Sergey Bubka	Soviet Union	Rome, Italy	August 31, 1984	4
6.00 m (19 ft 8 in)	Sergey Bubka	Soviet Union	Paris, France	July 13, 1985	5
6.01 m (19 ft 8 1/2 in)	Sergey Bubka	Soviet Union	Moscow, Soviet Union	July 8, 1986	6
6.03 m (19 ft 9 1/4 in)	Sergey Bubka	Soviet Union	Prague, Czechoslovakia	June 23, 1987	7
6.05 m (19 ft 10 in)	Sergey Bubka	Soviet Union	Bratislava, Czechoslovakia	June 9, 1988	8
6.06 m (19 ft 10 1/2 in)	Sergey Bubka	Soviet Union	Nice, France	July 10, 1988	9
6.07 m (19 ft 10 3/4 in)	Sergey Bubka	Soviet Union	Shizuoka, Japan	May 6, 1991	10
6.08 m (19 ft 11 1/4 in)	Sergey Bubka	Soviet Union	Moscow, Soviet Union	June 9, 1991	11
6.09 m (19 ft 11 3/4 in)	Sergey Bubka	Soviet Union	Formia, Italy	July 8, 1991	12
6.10 m (20 ft 0 in)	Sergey Bubka	Soviet Union	Malmö, Sweden	August 5, 1991	13
6.11 m (20 ft 1/2 in)	Sergey Bubka	Ukraine	Dijon, France	June 13, 1992	14
6.12 m (20 ft 3/4 in)	Sergey Bubka	Ukraine	Padua, Italy	August 30, 1992	15
6.13 m (20 ft 1 1/4 in)	Sergey Bubka	Ukraine	Tokyo, Japan	September 19, 1992	16
6.14 m (20 ft 1 1/2 in) A (Note: "From 2000, IAAF Rule 260.18s (formerly 260.6.a) was amended to say world records (as opposed to indoor world records) can be set in a facility 'with or without a roof.' So far, only one event - the women's pole vault - has been affected by this change, which was not applied retrospectively." Sergey Bubka set an indoor record of 6.15 m (20 ft 2 in) on February 21, 1993, in excess of the outdoor record, before this rule came into effect. Lavillenie's indoor world record was set after the rule came into effect, and thus since it exceeded Bubka's 6.14 m (20 ft 1 1/2 in) set outdoors, it also became the outright world record, the first indoor mark to do so in this event.)	Sergey Bubka	Ukraine	Sestriere, Italy	July 31, 1994	17
6.16 m (20 ft 2 1/2 in) i	Renaud Lavillenie	France	Donetsk, Ukraine	February 15, 2014	1
6.17 m (20 ft 2 3/4 in) i	Armand Duplantis	Sweden	Toruń, Poland	February 8, 2020	1
6.18 m (20 ft 3 1/4 in) i	Armand Duplantis	Sweden	Glasgow, UK	February 15, 2020	2
6.19 m (20 ft 3 1/2 in) i	Armand Duplantis	Sweden	Belgrade, Serbia	March 7, 2022	3
6.20 m (20 ft 4 in) i	Armand Duplantis	Sweden	Belgrade, Serbia	March 20, 2022	4
6.21 m (20 ft 4 1/4 in)	Armand Duplantis	Sweden	Eugene, U.S.	July 24, 2022	5
6.22 m (20 ft 4 3/4 in) i	Armand Duplantis	Sweden	Clermont-Ferrand, France	February 25, 2023	6
6.23 m (20 ft 5 1/4 in)	Armand Duplantis	Sweden	Eugene, U.S.	September 17, 2023	7
6.24 m (20 ft 5 1/2 in)	Armand Duplantis	Sweden	Xiamen, China	April 20, 2024	8
6.25 m (20 ft 6 in)	Armand Duplantis	Sweden	Paris, France	August 5, 2024	9
6.26 m (20 ft 6 1/4 in)	Armand Duplantis	Sweden	Chorzów, Poland	August 25, 2024	10
6.27 m (20 ft 6 3/4 in) i	Armand Duplantis	Sweden	Clermont-Ferrand, France	February 28, 2025	11
6.28 m (20 ft 7 in)	Armand Duplantis	Sweden	Stockholm, Sweden	June 15, 2025	12
6.29 m (20 ft 7 1/2 in)	Armand Duplantis	Sweden	Budapest, Hungary	August 12, 2025	13
6.30 m (20 ft 8 in)	Armand Duplantis	Sweden	Tokyo, Japan	September 15, 2025	14
6.31 m (20 ft 8 1/4 in) i	Armand Duplantis	Sweden	Uppsala, Sweden	March 12, 2026	15

== See also ==
- Men's pole vault indoor world record progression
- Women's pole vault world record progression
- List of pole vaulters who reached 6 metres
