= Vladimir Trofimenko =

Soviet pole vaulter

Personal information
- Born: 22 March 1953 Syzran, Soviet Union
- Died: 1994 (aged 40–41) Saint Petersburg, Russia

Sport
- Sport: Track and field
Medal record
Representing Soviet Union
European Championships
Gold medal – first place	1978 Prague	Pole vault
European Indoor Championships
Silver medal – second place	1978 Milan	Pole vault
Bronze medal – third place	1979 Vienna	Pole vault
Summer Universiade
Bronze medal – third place	1977 Sofia	Pole vault

Vladimir Trofimenko (Russian: Владимир Трофименко; 22 March 1953 – 1994) was a pole vaulter who represented the USSR. He won the 1978 European Championships in Athletics as well as two medals at the European Indoor Championships.

In 1978 he vaulted 5.61 m and break the Soviet national outdoor pole vault record.

He was married Yolanda Chen.

== Achievements ==
Year	Competition	Venue	Position	Notes
1977	Universiade	Sofia, Bulgaria	3rd	
1978	European Indoor Championships	Milan, Italy	2nd	
	European Championships	Prague, Czechoslovakia	1st	5.55 CR
1979	European Indoor Championships	Vienna, Austria	3rd	
