= Jeff Buckingham =

American pole vaulter

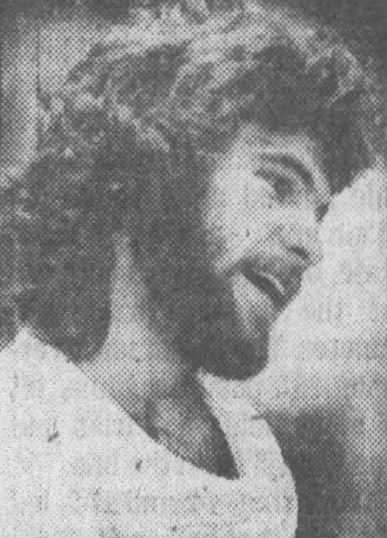
- Buckingham in 1983

Personal information
- Born: June 14, 1960 (age 66) Gardner, Kansas, U.S.
- Spouse: Terri (Note: Buckingham's spouse whose named Terri is mentioned in the (Whatever Happened To?) section)

Sport
- Country: United States
- Sport: Athletics
- Event: Pole vault
Medal record
Representing United States
Pan American Games
Athletics
| Silver medal – second place | 1983 Caracas | Men's pole vault |

Jeff Buckingham (born June 14, 1960) is an American pole vaulter.

== Life and career ==
Buckingham was born in Gardner, Kansas. He was a Kansas Jayhawks pole vaulter. (Note: Below the picture, it’s mentioned that Buckingham was a Kansas Jayhawks pole vaulter)

Buckingham competed at the 1983 Pan American Games, winning the silver medal in the men's pole vault event.
