= Anton Paskalev =

Bulgarian pole vaulter

Personal information
- Born: 6 November 1958 (age 67)

Sport
- Sport: Track and field

Anton Paskalev (Bulgarian: Антон Паскалев; born 6 November 1958) is a retired Bulgarian pole vaulter.

He finished seventh at the 1980 European Indoor Championships.

His personal best jump was 5.60 metres, achieved in June 1984 in Sofia. This ranks him tenth among Bulgarian pole vaulters, only behind Spas Bukhalov, Atanas Tarev, Nikolay Nikolov, Stanimir Penchev, Delko Lesov, Ilian Efremov, Ivo Yanchev, Valentin Videv, and Galin Nikov.
