= Felix Böhni =

Swiss pole vaulter (born 1958)

Personal information
- Nationality: Swiss
- Born: 14 February 1958 (age 68)

Sport
- Sport: Athletics
- Event: Pole vault

Felix Böhni (born 14 February 1958) is a Swiss athlete. He competed in the men's pole vault at the 1980 Summer Olympics and the 1984 Summer Olympics, finishing seventh in 1984. Böhni is from Zurich, Switzerland. While competing for San Jose State University, he was the 1983 NCAA Champion in the pole vault.
