= Brian Hooper =

British pole vaulter

Personal information
- Nickname: Hooperman
- Nationality: British (English)
- Born: 18 May 1953 (age 73) Sheerwater, Woking, Surrey, England
- Height: 5 ft 9 in (175 cm)
- Weight: 159 lb (72 kg)

Sport
- Sport: Athletics
- Event: Pole Vault
- Club: Woking Athletics Club

Achievements and titles
- Olympic finals: 1976, 1980
- Personal best: Pole Vault: 5.59m (1980,NR)
Medal record
Men's Athletics
Representing England
Commonwealth Games
Bronze medal – third place	1974 Christchurch	Pole Vault
Bronze medal – third place	1978 Edmonton	Pole Vault

Brian Roger Leslie Hooper (born 18 May 1953) is a British former pole vaulter, who competed at the 1976 Summer Olympics and the 1980 Summer Olympics. He was the winner of the 1982 World Superstars Championship.

== Biography ==
In the 1970s Hooper was an athletics coach at George Abbot School. Hooper was the United Kingdom's leading pole vaulter from 1974 to 1980, competing in two Olympic Games, two European Athletics Championships and winning the bronze medal at both the 1974 for the England team in Christchurch, New Zealand and the 1978 Commonwealth Games, representing England in Edmonton, Canada. In 1986 he represented England for the third time at a Commonwealth Games, at the 1986 Commonwealth Games in Edinburgh, Scotland.

Hooper became the British pole vault champion after winning the British AAA Championships title at the 1973 AAA Championships. and although he only won the AAA title outright twice more in 1980 and 1986, he was considered the British champion by virtue of being the highest placed British athlete in 1974, 1976, 1977 and 1978. During the 1980 AAAs he set his personal best height of 5.59m, which was then the United Kingdom pole vault record. Additionally he also won the 1979 UK Athletics Championships title.

Hooper also held the United Kingdom masters (veterans) pole vault best performance record, with a leap of 5.01 metres in 1994 and set the over-40s age group pole vault record.

Hooper currently lives in Guildford, Surrey and is a personal fitness coach. He is separated and has one daughter, Tilly, who is also a pole vaulter who has competed in competitions including winning gold at the 2018 BUCS indoor national championships.

== Superstars ==
Hooper is the second most successful Superstars competitor ever, winning six titles, including becoming the only European to win the World Championship in 1982. He was only defeated in two events (his 1982 and 2004 UK heats), and is the only man to have won three International Superstars titles. Only three times World Superstars Champion Brian Budd managed to remain undefeated in all contests.

In 2004 (aged 50) he participated in the UK Championship again, and performed well finishing a very creditable fourth in his heat, winning the kayaking event, and finishing runner-up in the golf. During the 2004 event he was at least 15 years older than all of the other competitors, competed with a torn pectoral muscle and was included in the event as a replacement at only seven day's notice.

Hooper also regularly competed in the Superteams version of the contest, representing "the Athletes", who were undefeated from 1979 to 1984. In 1979 he famously struggled to get on a balance beam during the obstacle course – almost costing his team the event – while disoriented after completing the sit-ups part of the race. In the years later, Hooper became one of the top British competitors in the obstacle course, regularly leaping the high wall in one stride.

=== Superstars record ===
Year	Event	Position
1982	British Heat 2	3rd
1982	British Final	1st
1982	International	1st
1982	World Final	1st
1983	British Final	1st
1983	International	1st
1984	International	1st
2004	British Heat 4	4th

== Achievements ==
Year	Competition	Venue	Position	Event	Notes
Representing United Kingdom
1976	Olympic Games	Montreal, Canada	16th	Pole Vault	5.10m
1980	Olympic Games	Moscow, Soviet Union	11th	Pole Vault	5.35 m
Representing England
1974	Commonwealth Games	Christchurch, New Zealand	3rd	Pole Vault	5.00m
1978	Commonwealth Games	Edmonton, Canada	3rd	Pole Vault	5.00m
