= Vladimir Polyakov (pole vaulter) =

Soviet pole vaulter (born 1960)

Personal information
- Born: 17 April 1960 (age 66) Aleksinsky District, Tula Oblast, Soviet Union

Sport
- Sport: Track and field
Medal record
Representing Soviet Union
European Championships
Silver medal – second place	1982 Athens	Pole vault
European Indoor Championships
Gold medal – first place	1983 Budapest	Pole vault
Silver medal – second place	1980 Sindelfingen	Pole vault
Summer Universiade
Silver medal – second place	1981 Bucharest	Pole vault

Vladimir Polyakov (Russian: Владимир Поляков; born 17 April 1960) is a retired Soviet pole vaulter who represented the Soviet Union and later Russia. On 26 June 1981 he managed to clear 5.81 metres, beating Thierry Vigneron's six-day-old world record. Two years later Polyakov lost the record to Pierre Quinon, who jumped 5.82. Polyakov won a silver medal at the 1982 European Championships, and won the European Indoor Championships in 1983.

== Achievements ==
Year	Competition	Venue	Position	Notes
1980	European Indoor Championships	Sindelfingen, West Germany	2nd	
1981	European Indoor Championships	Grenoble, France	7th	
1982	European Championships	Athens, Greece	2nd	
1983	European Indoor Championships	Budapest, Hungary	1st	

Records
Preceded by (France) Thierry Vigneron	Men's pole vault world record holder 26 June 1981 – 28 August 1983	Succeeded by (France) Pierre Quinon
Sporting positions
Preceded by (Poland) Władysław Kozakiewicz	Men's pole vault best year performance 1981	Succeeded by (United States) David Volz (France) Jean-Michel Bellot
