= Aleksandr Krupskiy =

Soviet pole vaulter

Medal record

Men's athletics

Representing Soviet Union

European Championships
Gold medal – first place	1982 Athens	Pole vault

European Indoor Championships
Silver medal – second place	1981 Grenoble	Pole vault

Aleksandr Konstantinovich Krupskiy (Russian: Александр Константинович Крупский; born 4 January 1960) is a retired pole vaulter who represented the USSR and later Russia. He won the 1982 European Athletics Championships as well as three medals at the European Indoor Championships.

== Achievements ==
Year	Competition	Venue	Position	Event	Notes
Representing Soviet Union
1981	European Indoor Championships	Grenoble, France	2nd	Pole vault	
1982	European Indoor Championships	Milan, Italy	4th	Pole vault	
1982	European Championships	Athens, Greece	1st	Pole vault	5.60 CR
1984	European Indoor Championships	Gothenburg, Sweden	2nd	Pole vault	
1984	Friendship Games	Moscow, Soviet Union	3rd	Pole vault	5.70 m
1985	European Indoor Championships	Athens, Greece	3rd	Pole vault	
