= Günther Lohre =

German pole vaulter (1953–2019)

Personal information
- Nationality: German
- Born: 12 May 1953 Leonberg, West Germany
- Died: 15 March 2019 (aged 65) Leonberg, Germany

Sport
- Sport: Athletics
- Event: Pole vault

Günther Lohre (12 May 1953 – 15 March 2019) was a German athlete. He competed in the men's pole vault at the 1976 Summer Olympics.
