= 1979 European Athletics Indoor Championships =

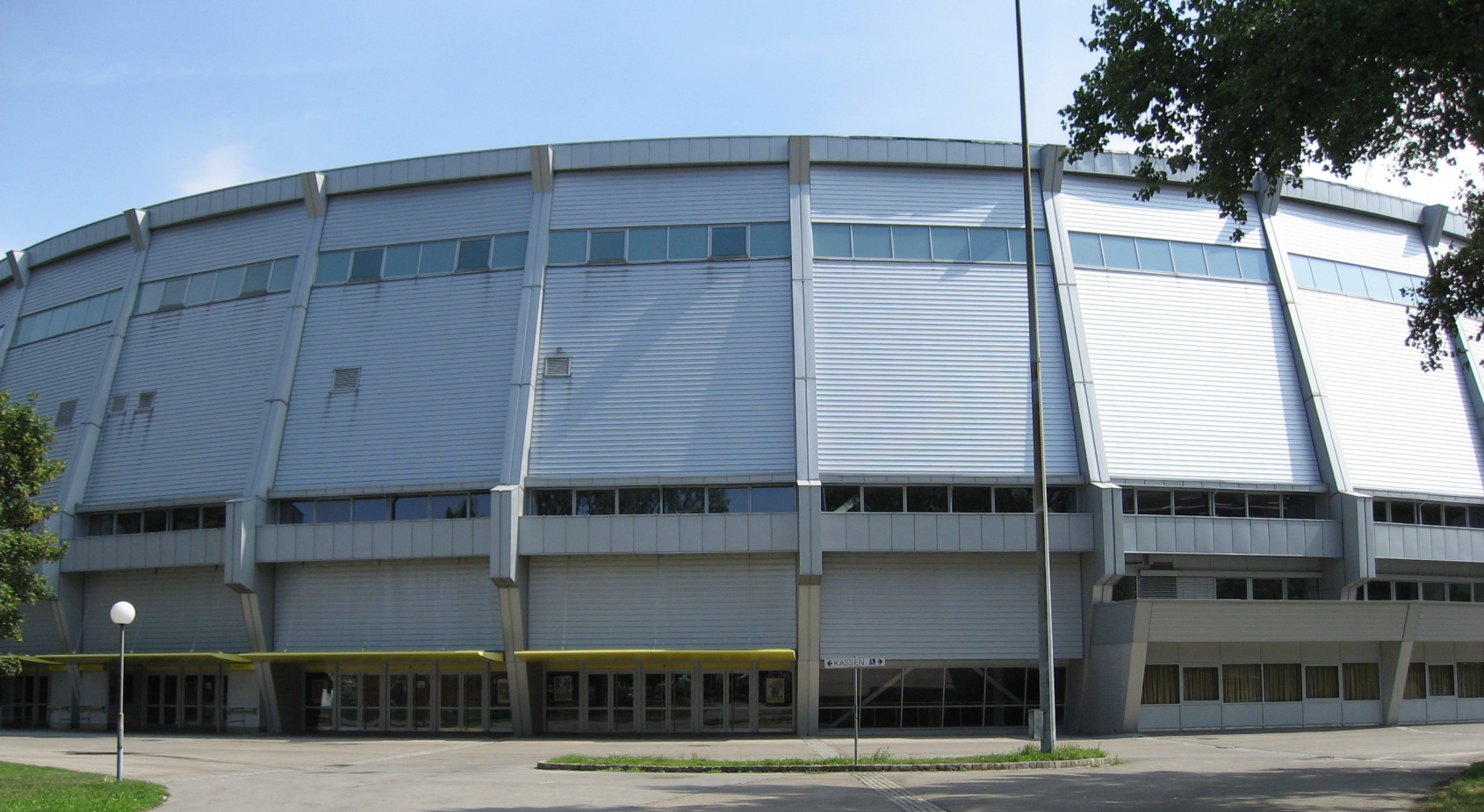
- Host venue (shown in 2007)
- Dates: 24–25 February 1979
- Host city: Vienna; Austria
- Venue: Ferry Dusika Halle
- Events: 19
- Participation: 210 athletes from 24 nations
- Records set: 2 AR, 6 CR

The 1979 European Athletics Indoor Championships were held in Vienna, the capital city in Austria, on 24 and 25 February 1979. It was the second time the championships had been held in that city.

== Medal summary ==
=== Men ===
Event	Gold		Silver		Bronze	
60 metres	Marian Woronin (POL)	6.57 =AR, CR	Leszek Dunecki (POL)	6.62	Petar Petrov (BUL)	6.63
400 metres	Karel Kolář (TCH)	46.21 CR	Stefano Malinverni (ITA)	46.59	Horia Toboc (ROM)	46.86
800 metres	Antonio Páez (ESP)	1:47.4a	Binko Kolev (BUL)	1:47.8a	András Paróczai (HUN)	1:48.2a
1500 metres	Eamonn Coghlan (IRL)	3:41.8a	Thomas Wessinghage (FRG)	3:42.2a	John Robson (GBR)	3:42.8a
3000 metres	Markus Ryffel (SUI)	7:44.43 CR	Christoph Herle (FRG)	7:45.44	Aleksandr Fedotkin (URS)	7:45.50
60 metres hurdles	Thomas Munkelt (GDR)	7.59 CR	Arto Bryggare (FIN)	7.67	Eduard Pereverzev (URS)	7.70
High jump	Vladimir Yashchenko (URS)	2.26	Gennadiy Belkov (URS)	2.26	Andre Schneider-Laub (FRG)	2.24
Pole vault	Władysław Kozakiewicz (POL)	5.58 AR, CR	Konstantin Volkov (URS)	5.45	Vladimir Trofimenko (URS)	5.45
Long jump	Vladimir Tsepelyov (URS)	7.88	Valeriy Podluzhniy (URS)	7.86	Lutz Franke (GDR)	7.80
Triple jump	Gennadiy Valyukevich (URS)	17.02	Anatoliy Piskulin (URS)	16.97	Jaak Uudmäe (URS)	16.91
Shot put	Reijo Ståhlberg (FIN)	20.47	Geoff Capes (GBR)	20.23	Vladimir Kiselyov (URS)	20.01

=== Women ===
Event	Gold		Silver		Bronze	
60 metres	Marlies Göhr (GDR)	7.16	Marita Koch (GDR)	7.19	Lyudmila Storozhkova (URS)	7.22
400 metres	Verona Elder (GBR)	51.80	Jarmila Kratochvílová (TCH)	51.81	Karoline Käfer (AUT)	51.90
800 metres	Nikolina Shtereva (BUL)	2:02.6a	Anita Weiß (GDR)	2:02.9a	Fiţa Lovin (ROM)	2:03.1a
1500 metres	Natalia Mărășescu (ROM)	4:03.5a CR	Zamira Zaytseva (URS)	4:03.9a	Svetlana Guskova (URS)	4:07.4a
60 metres hurdles	Danuta Perka (POL)	7.95	Grażyna Rabsztyn (POL)	8.00	Nina Morgulina (URS)	8.09
High jump	Andrea Mátay (HUN)	1.92	Urszula Kielan (POL)	1.85	Ulrike Meyfarth (FRG)	1.80
Long jump	Siegrun Siegl (GDR)	6.70	Jarmila Nygrýnová (TCH)	6.42	Lena Johansson (SWE)	6.27
Shot put	Ilona Slupianek (GDR)	21.01	Marianne Adam (GDR)	20.11	Judy Oakes (GBR)	15.66

== Medal table ==
Rank	Nation	Gold	Silver	Bronze	Total
1	East Germany (GDR)	4	3	1	8
2	Soviet Union (URS)	3	5	8	16
3	Poland (POL)	3	3	0	6
4	Czechoslovakia (TCH)	1	2	0	3
5	Great Britain (GBR)	1	1	2	4
6	Bulgaria (BUL)	1	1	1	3
7	Finland (FIN)	1	1	0	2
8	Romania (ROU)	1	0	2	3
9	Hungary (HUN)	1	0	1	2
10	Ireland (IRL)	1	0	0	1
10	Spain (ESP)	1	0	0	1
10	Switzerland (SUI)	1	0	0	1
13	West Germany (FRG)	0	2	2	4
14	Italy (ITA)	0	1	0	1
15	Austria (AUT)	0	0	1	1
15	Sweden (SWE)	0	0	1	1
Totals (16 entries)		19	19	19	57

== Participating nations ==
- Austria (14)
- Belgium (5)
- Bulgaria (10)
- Czechoslovakia (11)
- Denmark (2)
- East Germany (17)
- Finland (12)
- France (10)
- Great Britain (10)
- Hungary (7)
- Ireland (3)
- Italy (16)
- Netherlands (4)
- Norway (2)
- Poland (13)
- Portugal (1)
- Romania (4)
- Soviet Union (28)
- Spain (5)
- Sweden (4)
- Switzerland (6)
- Turkey (1)
- West Germany (16)
- Yugoslavia (9)
