= Roger Oriol =

Spanish pole vaulter

Personal information
- Born: 25 May 1957 (age 69) Barcelona, Spain

Sport
- Sport: Track and field
Medal record
Representing Spain
Mediterranean Games
Bronze medal – third place	1979 Split	Pole vault

Roger Oriol Segura (born 25 May 1957) is a retired Spanish pole vaulter.

He finished sixth at the 1977 European Indoor Championships, sixteenth at the 1981 European Indoor Championships and joint thirteenth at the 1982 European Indoor Championships. He won a bronze medal at the 1979 Mediterranean Games.

Barella became Spanish champion in 1974, 1977, 1979, and 1980, rivalling with Efrén Alonso. He set championship records of 5.15 metres in 1979 and 1980, which were broken in 1982 when Alberto Ruiz achieved 5.20. Barella also became Spanish indoor champion in 1976, 1977, 1978, 1980, 1981 and 1982.
