= 1974 European Athletics Indoor Championships – Men's pole vault =

The men's pole vault event at the 1974 European Athletics Indoor Championships was held on 10 March in Gothenburg.

== Results ==
Rank	Name	Nationality	Result	Notes
1st place, gold medalist(s)	Tadeusz Ślusarski	Poland	5.35	
2nd place, silver medalist(s)	Antti Kalliomäki	Finland	5.30	
3rd place, bronze medalist(s)	Jānis Lauris	Soviet Union	5.30	
4	Reinhard Kuretzky	West Germany	5.20	
4	Wojciech Buciarski	Poland	5.20	
6	Volker Ohl	West Germany	5.20	
7	Yevgeniy Tananyka	Soviet Union	5.20	
8	Renato Dionisi	Italy	5.10	
9	Yuriy Isakov	Soviet Union	5.00	
10	Mike Bull	Great Britain	5.00	
11	Kjell Isaksson	Sweden	5.00	
12	Silvio Fraquelli	Italy	5.00	
