= Athletics at the 1972 Summer Olympics – Men's pole vault =

Men's pole vault at the Games of the XX Olympiad
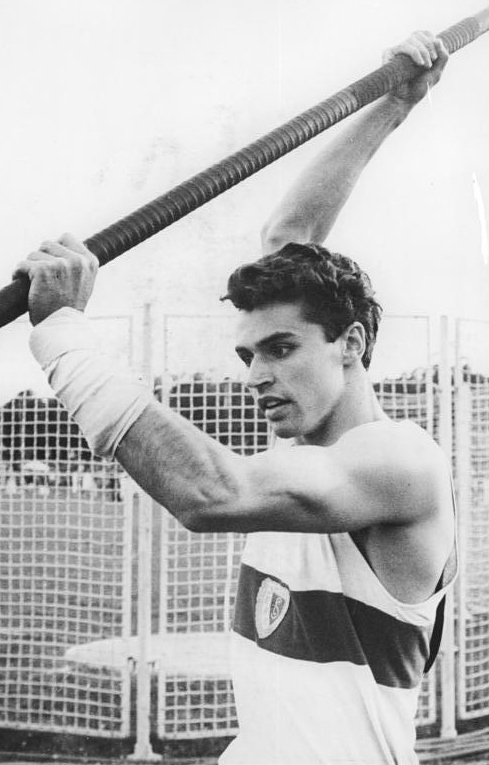
- Wolfgang Nordwig (1965)
- Venue: Olympic Stadium
- Dates: September 1 & 2, 1972
- Competitors: 21 from 12 nations
- Winning height: 5.50 OR

Medalists
1st place, gold medalist(s)		Wolfgang Nordwig; East Germany
2nd place, silver medalist(s)		Bob Seagren; United States
3rd place, bronze medalist(s)		Jan Johnson; United States

The men's pole vault field event at the 1972 Olympic Games took place on September 1 & 2. Twenty-one athletes from 12 nations competed. The maximum number of athletes per nation had been set at 3 since the 1930 Olympic Congress. The event was won by Wolfgang Nordwig of East Germany, the first non-American to win the event. Nordwig and silver medalist Bob Seagren were the third and fourth men to win multiple medals in the event.

Controversy arose when the new Cata-Pole, used by defending champion American Seagren and Sweden's Kjell Isaksson, was declared to be illegal, by the IAAF, on 25 July.

The pole was banned based on the fact that the pole contained carbon fibers; after an East German-led protest revealed that it contained no carbon fibers, the ban was lifted on 27 August.

Three days later the IAAF reversed itself again, reinstating the ban. The poles were then confiscated from the athletes. Seagren and Isaksson believed this gave other athletes, like the eventual gold medalist, Wolfgang Nordwig, an unfair advantage.

Seagren and Isaksson were given substitute poles which they had never used before to jump with. Isaksson, who had lost the world record to Seagren only two months earlier, did not clear a height in the qualifying round and was eliminated, leaving the stadium in disgust afterwards. After Seagren’s last vault, he was so incensed by the way that IAAF officials had handled the event that he took the pole he had been forced to vault with, and handed it back to IAAF President Adriaan Paulen.

This was the first time that the pole vault was not won by an American athlete. Between 1896 and 1968, the US won every gold medal.

Since 1972, the US has only won the men's pole vault twice, equalling the record of Poland and former republics of the USSR, whereas France has won three times since 1984.

== Background ==
This was the 17th appearance of the event, which is one of 12 athletics events to have been held at every Summer Olympics. The returning finalists from the 1968 Games were gold medalist Bob Seagren of the United States, bronze medalist Wolfgang Nordwig of East Germany, fourth-place finisher Christos Papanikolaou of Greece, seventh-place finisher (and 1964 finalist) Hervé d'Encausse of France, tenth-place finisher Kjell Isaksson of Sweden, and thirteenth-place finisher Mike Bull of Great Britain. Seagren, Nordwig, Papanikolaou, and Isaksson had all held the world record at some point since the Mexico City Games; Seagren came into Munich with the record at 5.63 metres. He and Isaksson were the favorites, with Nordwig a strong contender—at least until the former two had to change poles.

For the third time in Olympic history, no nation made its debut in the event. The United States made its 17th appearance, the only nation to have competed at every Olympic men's pole vault to that point.

== Competition format ==
The competition used the two-round format introduced in 1912, with results cleared between rounds. Vaulters received three attempts at each height. Ties were broken by the countback rule. At the time, total attempts was used after total misses.

In the qualifying round, the bar was set at 4.60 metres, 4.80 metres, 5.00 metres, and 5.10 metres. All vaulters clearing 5.10 metres advanced to the final. If fewer than 12 cleared that height, the top 12 (including ties) advanced.

In the final, the bar was set at 4.80 metres, 5.00 metres, 5.10 metres, 5.20 metres, 5.30 metres, and then increased by 5 centimetres at a time.

== Records ==
Prior to the competition, the existing World and Olympic records were as follows.

World record	Bob Seagren (USA)	5.63	Eugene, United States	2 July 1972
Olympic record	Bob Seagren (USA); Claus Schiprowski (FRG); Wolfgang Nordwig (GDR)	5.40	Mexico City, Mexico	16 October 1968

Bob Seagren and Wolfgang Nordwig each cleared 5.40 metres to match their shared Olympic record; only Nordwig was able to clear 5.45 metres to break it. He also succeeded at 5.50 to set the new Olympic mark there.

== Results ==
Key

- o = Height cleared
- x = Height failed
- – = Height passed
- r = Retired
- SB = Season's best
- PB = Personal best
- NR = National record
- AR = Area record
- OR = Olympic record
- WR = World record
- WL = World lead
- NM = No mark
- DNS = Did not start
- DQ = Disqualified

All heights are listed in metres.

=== Qualifying ===
All jumpers reaching 5.10 m (16 ft 9 in) and the top 12 including ties qualified for the finals. No vaulters had any failures at 4.60 metres (all either passed or cleared on the first try, though the Official Report does not indicate which for each vaulter).

Rank	Athlete	Nation	Group	4.80	5.00	5.10	Height	Notes
1	Antti Kalliomäki	Finland	A	—	—	o	5.10	Q
1	Wolfgang Nordwig	East Germany	A	—	—	o	5.10	Q
3	Bruce Simpson	Canada	B	—	o	o	5.10	Q
3	Hervé d’Encausse	France	A	—	o	o	5.10	Q
5	Reinhard Kuretzky	West Germany	B	o	o	o	5.10	Q
6	François Tracanelli	France	B	—	—	xo	5.10	Q
6	Bob Seagren	United States	A	—	—	xo	5.10	Q
8	Hans Lagerqvist	Sweden	A	—	o	xo	5.10	Q
9	Volker Ohl	West Germany	A	o	o	xo	5.10	Q
10	Jan Johnson	United States	A	o	xo	xo	5.10	Q
11	Tadeusz Ślusarski	Poland	B	—	o	xxx	5.00	q
12	Wojciech Buciarski	Poland	B	—	xo	xxx	5.00	q
13	Khristos Papanikolaou	Greece	A	xxo	xo	xxx	5.00	q
14	Ingemar Jernberg	Sweden	B	xo	xxo	xxx	5.00	q
15	Silvio Fraquelli	Italy	B	o	xxx	—N/a	4.80	
16	Ray Boyd	Australia	B	xo	xxx	—N/a	4.80	
16	Mike Bull	Great Britain	B	xo	xxx	—N/a	4.80	
18	Steve Smith	United States	A	xxo	xxx	—N/a	4.80	
—	Kjell Isaksson	Sweden	A	—	xxx	—N/a	No mark	
—	Kirk Bryde	Canada	B	xxx	—N/a		No mark	
—	Renato Dionisi	Italy	A	xxx	—N/a		No mark	
—	Abass Goudiaby	Senegal	B	DNS				

=== Final ===
Rank	Athlete	Nation	4.80	5.00	5.10	5.20	5.30	5.35	5.40	5.45	5.50	5.56	Height	Notes
1st place, gold medalist(s)	Wolfgang Nordwig	East Germany	—	—	o	—	xo	o	xo	o	xxo	xxx	5.50	OR
2nd place, silver medalist(s)	Bob Seagren	United States	—	—	—	o	—	o	xxo	xxx	—N/a		5.40	
3rd place, bronze medalist(s)	Jan Johnson	United States	—	—	—	xo	—	xo	xxx	—N/a			5.35	
4	Reinhard Kuretzky	West Germany	o	xo	xxo	xo	o	xxx	—N/a				5.30	
5	Bruce Simpson	Canada	—	o	xxo	o	xxx	—N/a					5.20	
6	Volker Ohl	West Germany	—	—	xo	xo	xxx	—N/a					5.20	
7	Hans Lagerqvist	Sweden	—	xo	—	xxo	xxx	—N/a					5.20	
8	François Tracanelli	France	—	—	o	—	xxx	—N/a					5.10	
9	Ingemar Jernberg	Sweden	—	xxo	xo	xxx	—N/a						5.10	
10	Wojciech Buciarski	Poland	—	o	—	xxx	—N/a						5.00	
11	Khristos Papanikolaou	Greece	o	o	—	xxx	—N/a						5.00	
—	Antti Kalliomäki	Finland	—	—	—	xxx	—N/a						No mark	
—	Hervé d’Encausse	France	—	—	xxx	—N/a							No mark	
—	Tadeusz Ślusarski	Poland	—	xxx	—N/a								No mark	
