= Dan Ripley =

American pole vaulter (born 1953)

Dan Ripley (born October 7, 1953) is a retired American track and field athlete, known primarily for his success in the pole vault. Between January 18, 1975 and March 3, 1979 he improved the indoor World record in the pole vault five times.

The first time he set the record was at the Sunkist Invitational where he bettered the nearly two year old record by Steve Smith, jumping 5.51 m (18 ft 3/4 in). He improved upon his own record twice the following year, the last at the Los Angeles Times Invitational at 5.54 m (18 ft 2 in). Two days later, Tadeusz Ślusarski jumped 5.56 m (18 ft 2 3/4 in) to take Ripley's record en route to winning the Olympic gold medal outdoors later that year. Ślusarsk's record only lasted five days before another Polish future gold medalist Władysław Kozakiewicz improved it. A week after that, Ripley took his record back with a 5.58 m (18 ft 3 1/2 in) in New York City. His record would last almost two years before Mike Tully improved the record twice in 1978. It took Ripley a year to get the record back the final time, jumping 5.63 m (18 ft 5 1/2 in) in the US vs USSR dual meet in Ft. Worth Texas. His record lasted almost another year until it was surpassed by Soviet Konstantin Volkov, who won the silver medal behind Kozakiewicz later in 1980.

Ripley began pole vaulting at age 9, when his father, a civil engineer dug out a pit in his back yard. He jokingly said he took up the pole vault after falling on his head showing off to his sisters. At Loara High School he no-heighted at his championship meet. He next went to Cypress College, where he won the state community college championship. That championship won him a scholarship to California State University, San Jose, which changed its name to San Jose State University the following year.

During the summer of 1974 he and his then wife would spend evenings studying the techniques from the book Mechanics of the Pole Vault by 1939 NCAA Champion from Columbia University, Dr. Richard V. Ganslen. Ripley focused and excelled in the fundamentals, particularly attacking the box (running hard to the point the pole first contacts the plant box) dreaming of becoming consistent at 16'6" and that one day he might be able to make 17 feet. Instead he hurt his back and had to take a few weeks off. The day he came back, he made 17 feet. Then in early September, he did it again all while practicing with short run up and soft poles. He decided to lengthen his run up and try a stiffer pole. 17'3" and 17'6" came in his first try. That year, the world leading pole vault was 17'8" meaning Ripley, with an official best of only 16'3" was suddenly world class. With the season over and no meets available, Ripley had to wait until December to compete. SJSU coach Ernie Bullard got him into a meet in Saskatoon where he proved he was ready setting a Canadian All Comers record of 17'7"

A month later at the Sunkist Invitational, he easily won with 17'6" and was ready to call it a day. Bullard suggest he keep going.

The bar was at 18'1", which was five inches higher than I'd ever attempted, I didn't think I had a chance, so I was relaxed. On my first try I barely ticked the bar off. I couldn't believe it. I said to myself, "Hey, I think I can make that."

Ripley no heighted at the 1976 Olympic Trials, along with 15 other vaulters. Four years later he came back to finish second behind Tom Hintnaus to qualify for the Olympic Team that did not go to the Olympics due to the 1980 Summer Olympics boycott. He did however receive one of 461 Congressional Gold Medals created especially for the spurned athletes. The first four places in those trials, including Ripley, Smith, Tully and Hintnaus all grew up and went to high school only a few miles off of a short strip of the 405 Freeway in Southern California. In 1984, he again no heighted at the Olympic Trials, but it was the tenth year in a row he had cleared 18 feet.

Ripley's personal best was set while winning the national championship in Knoxville in 1982 at 5.72 m (18 ft 9 in), beating Pacific Coast Club teammate Billy Olson. It was the second national championship of his career, also winning in 1978. He nearly matched that with a 5.71 indoors 8 months later.

Even while he was an athlete, Ripley began a coaching career at the Community College level starting first at Cypress College, then Mt. San Antonio College and finally Long Beach City College.

In 2012 he was honored in the Long Beach City College "Hall of Champions."

== World rankings ==
Ripley was voted by the experts at Track and Field News to be ranked among the best in the USA and the world at the pole vault during his career. .

Pole vault
Year	World rank	US rank
1975	5th	2nd
1976	8th	3rd
1977	9th	3rd
1978	5th	2nd
1979	8th	2nd
1980	-	4th
1981	-	9th
1982	6th	3rd
1983	-	5th
1984	-	8th

While not known as a pole vaulting school, between Christos Papanikolaou, Felix Böhni and Ripley, San Jose State had a world top ten pole vaulter for fourteen years between 1966 and 1983.
