= Athletics at the 1976 Summer Olympics – Men's pole vault =

Men's pole vault at the Games of the XXI Olympiad
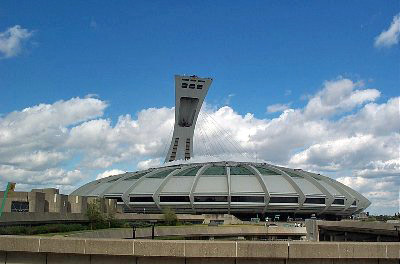
- Olympic Stadium (2003)
- Venue: Olympic Stadium, Montréal
- Dates: 24 & 26 July 1976
- Competitors: 27 from 13 nations
- Winning height: 5.50 =OR

Medalists
1st place, gold medalist(s)		Tadeusz Ślusarski; Poland
2nd place, silver medalist(s)		Antti Kalliomäki; Finland
3rd place, bronze medalist(s)		Dave Roberts; United States

The men's pole vault competition featured in the athletics programme at the 1976 Summer Olympics and was held at the Olympic Stadium in Montréal on 24 and 26 July. Twenty-seven athletes from 13 nations competed. The maximum number of athletes per nation had been set at 3 since the 1930 Olympic Congress.

All three medallists tied the Olympic record mark of 5.50 metres. Tadeusz Ślusarski of Poland and Antti Kalliomäki of Finland both cleared all heights up to 5.50 m with no misses; Ślusarski passed two heights more than Kalliomäki, and won on the basis of fewer vaults in accordance with the rules of the time. American Dave Roberts, who also cleared 5.50 m on his first try but had one miss from an earlier height, took the bronze medal.

Ślusarski's gold medal was Poland's first medal in the men's pole vault. Kalliomäki's silver was Finland's first medal since 1960 and matched the nation's best result to date (from 1948). Roberts's bronze was the worst result yet for the Americans, who had won the first 16 editions of the event and taken silver at the 17th in 1972.

== Background ==
This was the 18th appearance of the event, which is one of 12 athletics events to have been held at every Summer Olympics. The returning finalists from the 1972 Games were fifth-place finisher Bruce Simpson of Canada, eighth-place finisher François Tracanelli of France, ninth-place finisher Ingemar Jernberg of Sweden, tenth-place finisher Wojciech Buciarski, and twelfth-place finishers Antti Kalliomäki and Tadeusz Ślusarski of Poland (each of whom had not cleared any height in the final). The favorites were David Roberts (the world record holder) and Earl Bell of the United States and Władysław Kozakiewicz of Poland.

Cuba was the only nation that made its pole vaulting debut in the event. The United States made its 18th appearance, the only nation to have competed at every Olympic men's pole vault to that point.

== Competition format ==
The competition used the two-round format introduced in 1912, with results cleared between rounds. Vaulters received three attempts at each height. Ties were broken by the countback rule. At the time, total attempts was used after total misses.

In the qualifying round, the bar was set at 4.60 metres (which all vaulters passed on), 4.80 metres, 5.00 metres, and 5.10 metres. All vaulters clearing 5.10 metres advanced to the final. If fewer than 12 cleared that height, the top 12 (including ties) advanced.

In the final, the bar was set at 4.80 metres (which all vaulters passed on), 5.00 metres, 5.10 metres, 5.20 metres, and then increased by 5 centimetres as a time.

== Records ==
Prior to the competition, the existing world and Olympic records were as follows.

World record	David Roberts (USA)	5.70	Eugene, United States	22 June 1976
Olympic record	Wolfgang Nordwig (GDR)	5.50	Munich, East Germany	2 September 1972

The three medalists (Tadeusz Ślusarski, Antti Kalliomäki, and David Roberts) all matched the Olympic record at 5.50 metres; none were able to break it.

== Schedule ==
Date	Time	Round
Saturday, 24 July 1976	10:00	Qualifying
Monday, 26 July 1976	12:30	Final

== Results ==
Key

- o = Height cleared
- x = Height failed
- – = Height passed
- r = Retired
- SB = Season's best
- PB = Personal best
- NR = National record
- AR = Area record
- OR = Olympic record
- WR = World record
- WL = World lead
- NM = No mark
- DNS = Did not start
- DQ = Disqualified

=== Qualifying ===
The qualification was set to 5.10 metres. A total of 20 athletes achieved this height.

Rank	Group	Athlete	Nation	4.80	5.00	5.10	Height	Note
1	A	Antti Kalliomäki	Finland	–	–	o	5.10	Q
1	A	Kjell Isaksson	Sweden	–	–	o	5.10	Q
1	A	Earl Bell	United States	–	–	o	5.10	Q
1	A	Władysław Kozakiewicz	Poland	–	–	o	5.10	Q
1	A	Günther Lohre	West Germany	–	–	o	5.10	Q
1	A	Dave Roberts	United States	–	–	o	5.10	Q
1	A	Terry Porter	United States	–	–	o	5.10	Q
1	A	Yuriy Prokhorenko	Soviet Union	–	–	o	5.10	Q
1	A	Wojciech Buciarski	Poland	–	–	o	5.10	Q
1	B	Patrick Abada	France	–	–	o	5.10	Q
1	B	François Tracanelli	France	–	–	o	5.10	Q
12	B	Roberto Moré	Cuba	–	o	o	5.10	Q
12	B	Tapani Haapakoski	Finland	–	o	o	5.10	Q
12	B	Bruce Simpson	Canada	–	o	o	5.10	Q
12	B	Itsuo Takanezawa	Japan	–	o	o	5.10	Q
16	A	Vladimir Kishkun	Soviet Union	–	–	xo	5.10	Q
16	A	Tadeusz Ślusarski	Poland	–	–	xo	5.10	Q
18	B	Brian Hooper	Great Britain	–	xo	xo	5.10	Q
19	A	Don Baird	Australia	–	–	xxo	5.10	Q
19	A	Jean-Michel Bellot	France	–	–	xxo	5.10	Q
21	B	Ray Boyd	Australia	–	o	xxx	5.00	
22	B	Ken Wenman	Canada	o	o	xxx	5.00	
23	B	Dimitrios Kyteas	Greece	–	xo	xxx	5.00	
24	B	Jeffrey Gutteridge	Great Britain	o	xxx		4.80	
—	A	Yury Isakov	Soviet Union	–	–	xxx	No mark	
—	B	Yoshiomi Iwama	Japan	–	–	xxx	No mark	
—	B	Ingemar Jernberg	Sweden	–	–	xxx	No mark	
—	B	Rihan Obaid	Saudi Arabia	DNS				

=== Final ===
Rank	Athlete	Nation	5.00	5.10	5.20	5.25	5.30	5.35	5.40	5.45	5.50	5.55	5.60	Height	Notes
1st place, gold medalist(s)	Tadeusz Ślusarski	Poland	–	–	o	–	–	–	o	–	o	xxx	—N/a	5.50	=OR
2nd place, silver medalist(s)	Antti Kalliomäki	Finland	–	o	–	–	o	–	o	o	o	xxx	—N/a	5.50	=OR
3rd place, bronze medalist(s)	Dave Roberts	United States	–	–	–	–	–	xo	–	–	o	–	xxx	5.50	=OR
4	Patrick Abada	France	–	–	–	–	xo	–	–	xo	–	xxx	—N/a	5.45	
5	Wojciech Buciarski	Poland	–	–	o	–	–	xo	–-	xo	x-	xx	—N/a	5.45	
6	Earl Bell	United States	–	–	o	–	–	o	–	xxo	–	xxx	—N/a	5.45	
7	Jean-Michel Bellot	France	–	–	–	o	–	–	o	–	xxx	—N/a		5.40	
8	Itsuo Takanezawa	Japan	xo	–	xo	–	xo	–	xxo	xxx	—N/a			5.40	
9	Günther Lohre	West Germany	–	xo	–	xo	–	xxo	–	xxx	—N/a			5.35	
10	Yuriy Prokhorenko	Soviet Union	–	–	–	o	–	xxx	—N/a					5.25	
11	Władysław Kozakiewicz	Poland	–	–	–	xo	–	–	–	xxx	—N/a			5.25	
12	Don Baird	Australia	–	o	–	xo	–	xxx	—N/a					5.25	
13	Vladimir Kishkun	Soviet Union	–	–	o	–	–	–	xxx	—N/a				5.20	
13	Terry Porter	United States	–	–	o	–	–	xxx	—N/a					5.20	
15	Tapani Haapakoski	Finland	xo	–	o	–	xxx	—N/a						5.20	
16	Brian Hooper	Great Britain	xo	–	xxx	—N/a								5.00	
—	Bruce Simpson	Canada	xxx	—N/a										No mark	
—	Roberto Moré	Cuba	–	xxx	—N/a									No mark	
—	François Tracanelli	France	–	–	–	–	xxx	—N/a						No mark	
—	Kjell Isaksson	Sweden	–	–	xxx	—N/a								No mark	
