= 1975 European Athletics Indoor Championships – Men's pole vault =

The men's pole vault event at the 1975 European Athletics Indoor Championships was held on 9 March in Katowice.

== Results ==
Rank	Name	Nationality	Result	Notes
1st place, gold medalist(s)	Antti Kalliomäki	Finland	5.35	
2nd place, silver medalist(s)	Wojciech Buciarski	Poland	5.30	
3rd place, bronze medalist(s)	Władysław Kozakiewicz	Poland	5.30	
4	Bogdan Markowski	Poland	5.30	
5	Yuriy Isakov	Soviet Union	5.30	
6	Yuriy Prokhorenko	Soviet Union	5.30	
7	François Tracanelli	France	5.30	
8	Kjell Isaksson	Sweden	5.25	
9	Jean-Michel Bellot	France	5.20	
10	Vladimir Trofimenko	Soviet Union	5.20	
11	Günther Lohre	West Germany	5.20	
12	Raimo Eskola	Finland	5.20	
13	Reinhard Kuretzky	West Germany	5.20	
14	Brian Hooper	Great Britain	5.00	
15	Serge Lefebvre	France	5.00	
16	Antonin Hadinger	Czechoslovakia		
