= Athletics at the 1975 Pan American Games – Men's pole vault =

Men's pole vault at the Pan American Games

The men's pole vault event at the 1975 Pan American Games was held in Mexico City on 20 October.

== Results ==
| Rank | Name | Nationality | Result | Notes |
|---|---|---|---|---|
| 1st place, gold medalist(s) | Earl Bell | United States | 5.40 | GR |
| 2nd place, silver medalist(s) | Bruce Simpson | Canada | 5.20 | |
| 3rd place, bronze medalist(s) | Roberto Moré | Cuba | 5.20 | |
| 4 | Jeff Taylor | United States | 5.10 | |
| 5 | Alan Kane | Canada | 5.00 | |
| 6 | Juan Laza | Cuba | 4.95 | |
