= Athletics at the 1979 Pan American Games – Men's pole vault =

Men's pole vault at the 1979 Pan American Games
- Venue: Estadio Sixto Escobar
- Dates: 14 July
- Winning height: 5.15

Medalists
| Gold medal | Bruce Simpson | Canada |
| Silver medal | Greg Woepse | United States |
| Bronze medal | Brian Morrissette | Virgin Islands |

The men's pole vault competition of the athletics events at the 1979 Pan American Games took place on 14 July at the Estadio Sixto Escobar.

== Records ==
Prior to this competition, the existing world and Pan American Games records were as follows:

| World record | David Roberts (USA) | 5.70 | Eugene, Oregon, United States | June 22, 1976 |
| Pan American Games record | Earl Bell (USA) | 5.40 | Mexico City, Mexico | October 1975 |

== Results ==
All heights shown are in meters.

| KEY: | WR | World Record | GR | Pan American Record |

| Rank | Name | Nationality | Result | Notes |
|---|---|---|---|---|
| 1st place, gold medalist(s) | Bruce Simpson | Canada | 5.15 | |
| 2nd place, silver medalist(s) | Greg Woepse | United States | 5.05 | |
| 3rd place, bronze medalist(s) | Brian Morrissette | United States Virgin Islands | 4.85 | |
| | Edgardo Rivera | Puerto Rico | NM | |
| | Carlos Zequeira | Puerto Rico | NM | |
| | Billy Olsen | United States | DNS | |
