= Men's pole vault indoor world record progression =

The following is the men's pole vault indoor world record progression starting from 1889, with additional demonstration and professional records being noted. The best indoor performances on record as agreed to by the world's leading statisticians were accepted as the inaugural Indoor World Records from 1 January 1987; previous to this, they were regarded as world indoor bests. However, the inaugural record in this event was set early in 1987 by Sergey Bubka.

== Pre-IAAF ==
Mark	Athlete	Nat.	Date	Venue
3.35 m (10 ft 11 3/4 in)	Hugh Baxter	USA	9.02.1889	New York City
3.395 m (11 ft 1 1/2 in)	Jerome Magee	USA	1.03.1902	Milwaukee
3.44 m (11 ft 3 1/4 in)	LeRoy Samse	USA	11.03.1905	Milwaukee
3.49 m (11 ft 5 1/4 in)	LeRoy Samse	USA	22.01.1906	Cincinnati
3.535 m (11 ft 7 in)	Walter Dray	USA	26.01.1906	New York City
3.54 m (11 ft 7 1/4 in)	Sidney Grear	USA	13.03.1907	Chicago
3.66 m (12 ft 0 in)	Clare Jacobs	USA	12.02.1909	Chicago
3.73 m (12 ft 2 3/4 in)	Clare Jacobs	USA	23.02.1909	Chicago
3.79 m (12 ft 5 in)	Walter Dray	USA	06.04.1912	Chicago
3.86 m (12 ft 7 3/4 in)	John Kendall Gold	USA	29.03.1913	Chicago
3.87 m (12 ft 8 1/4 in)	Florin W. Floyd	USA	27.02.1916	Kansas City
3.92 m (12 ft 10 1/4 in)	Percy Graham	USA	08.04.1916	Evanston, United States
3.93 m (12 ft 10 1/2 in)	Edwin Myers	USA	30.03.1923	Evanston, United States
3.93 m (12 ft 10 1/2 in)	Edward Knourek	USA	30.03.1923	Evanston, United States
3.98 m (13 ft 1/2 in)	Dean Brownell	USA	15.03.1924	Evanston, United States
3.985 m (13 ft 3/4 in)	Charles Hoff	NOR	04.02.1926	New York City
4.00 m (13 ft 1 1/4 in)	Charles Hoff	NOR	06.02.1926	Boston
4.04 m (13 ft 3 in)	Charles Hoff	NOR	13.02.1926	New York City
4.06 m (13 ft 3 3/4 in)	Charles Hoff	NOR	17.02.1926	New York City
4.075 m (13 ft 4 1/4 in)	Charles Hoff	NOR	23.02.1926	New York City
4.09 m (13 ft 5 in)	Charles Hoff	NOR	27.02.1926	Baltimore
4.13 m (13 ft 6 1/2 in)	Charles Hoff	NOR	06.03.1926	Chicago
4.14 m (13 ft 6 3/4 in)	Charles Hoff	NOR	16.03.1926	New York City
4.15 m (13 ft 7 1/4 in)	Charles Hoff	NOR	20.03.1926	New York City
4.165 m (13 ft 7 3/4 in)	Charles Hoff	NOR	27.03.1926	St. Louis
4.17 m (13 ft 8 in)	Charles Hoff	NOR	09.04.1926	Chicago
4.195 m (13 ft 9 in)	Sabin Carr	USA	14.02.1927	New York City
4.29 m (14 ft 3/4 in)	Sabin Carr	USA	25.02.1928	New York City
4.31 m (14 ft 1 1/2 in)	Keith Brown	USA	15.03.1933	New York City
4.37 m (14 ft 4 in)	Keith Brown	USA	17.02.1934	New York City
4.38 m (14 ft 4 1/4 in)	George Varoff	USA	13.02.1937	Boston
4.42 m (14 ft 6 in)	Cornelius Warmerdam	USA	11.02.1939	Boston
4.425 m (14 ft 6 in)	Earle Meadows	USA	25.03.1939	Chicago
4.44 m (14 ft 6 3/4 in)	Earle Meadows	USA	08.02.1941	Boston
4.45 m (14 ft 7 in)	Earle Meadows	USA	08.03.1941	New York City
4.485 m (14 ft 8 1/2 in)	Cornelius Warmerdam	USA	07.02.1942	New York City
4.58 m (15 ft 1/4 in)	Cornelius Warmerdam	USA	07.02.1942	New York City
4.62 m (15 ft 1 3/4 in)	Cornelius Warmerdam	USA	14.02.1942	Boston
4.755 m (15 ft 7 in)	Cornelius Warmerdam	USA	14.02.1942	Boston
4.79 m (15 ft 8 1/2 in)	Cornelius Warmerdam	USA	20.03.1943	Chicago
4.81 m (15 ft 9 1/4 in)	Don Bragg	USA	13.02.1959	Philadelphia
4.83 m (15 ft 10 in)	John Uelses	USA	27.01.1962	Washington, DC
4.88 m (16 ft 0 in)	John Uelses	USA	02.02.1962	New York City
4.89 m (16 ft 1/2 in)	John Uelses	USA	03.02.1962	Boston
4.91 m (16 ft 1 1/4 in)	Don Meyers	USA	20.12.1962	Chicago
4.92 m (16 ft 1 1/2 in)	Pentti Nikula	FIN	19.01.1963	Nastola
4.93 m (16 ft 2 in)	David Tork	USA	25.01.1963	Toronto
4.96 m (16 ft 3 1/4 in)	Yang Chuan-Kwang	TWN	26.01.1963	Portland
5.00 m (16 ft 4 3/4 in)	Pentti Nikula	FIN	02.02.1963	Nastola
5.05 m (16 ft 6 3/4 in)	Pentti Nikula	FIN	02.02.1963	Nastola
5.10 m (16 ft 8 3/4 in)	Pentti Nikula	FIN	02.02.1963	Nastola

== World record progression (since 1966) ==
Ratified
Not ratified
Ratified but later rescinded
Pending ratification

Mark	Athlete	Nat.	Date	Venue
IAAF ratified bests (1966–1986)
5.12 m (16 ft 9 1/2 in)	John Pennel	USA	22.01.1966	Los Angeles
5.13 m (16 ft 9 3/4 in)	John Pennel	USA	12.02.1966	Los Angeles
5.19 m (17 ft 1/4 in) A	Robert Seagren	USA	05.03.1966	Albuquerque
5.20 m (17 ft 1/2 in)	Robert Seagren	USA	18.03.1966	Cleveland
5.20 m (17 ft 1/2 in)	Robert Seagren	USA	29.12.1966	Saskatoon
5.23 m (17 ft 1 3/4 in) A	Robert Seagren	USA	28.01.1967	Albuquerque
5.26 m (17 ft 3 in)	Robert Seagren	USA	18.02.1967	Cleveland
5.29 m (17 ft 4 1/4 in)	Robert Seagren	USA	25.01.1968	New York City
5.33 m (17 ft 5 3/4 in) A	Robert Seagren	USA	25.01.1969	Albuquerque
5.33 m (17 ft 5 3/4 in)	Robert Seagren	USA	08.02.1969	Inglewood
5.34 m (17 ft 6 in)	Kjell Isaksson	SWE	08.03.1970	Gothenburg
5.36 m (17 ft 7 in)	Jan Johnson	USA	20.06.1970	Des Moines
5.38 m (17 ft 7 3/4 in)	Kjell Isaksson	SWE	12.02.1971	Inglewood
5.40 m (17 ft 8 1/2 in)	Wolfgang Nordwig	GDR	14.03.1971	Sofia
5.41 m (17 ft 8 3/4 in)	Kjell Isaksson	SWE	19.03.1971	Cleveland
5.45 m (17 ft 10 1/2 in)	Kjell Isaksson	SWE	25.02.1972	New York City
5.46 m (17 ft 10 3/4 in)	Steve Smith	USA	20.01.1973	Los Angeles
5.49 m (18 ft 0 in)	Steve Smith	USA	26.01.1973	New York City
5.51 m (18 ft 3/4 in)	Dan Ripley	USA	18.01.1975	Los Angeles
5.52 m (18 ft 1 1/4 in)	Dan Ripley	USA	09.01.1976	College Park
5.54 m (18 ft 2 in)	Dan Ripley	USA	06.02.1976	Inglewood
5.56 m (18 ft 2 3/4 in)	Tadeusz Ślusarski	POL	08.02.1976	Warsaw
5.57 m (18 ft 3 1/4 in)	Władysław Kozakiewicz	POL	13.02.1976	Toronto
5.58 m (18 ft 3 1/2 in)	Dan Ripley	USA	20.02.1976	New York City
5.59 m (18 ft 4 in)	Mike Tully	USA	07.01.1978	Long Beach, California
5.62 m (18 ft 5 1/4 in)	Mike Tully	USA	11.03.1978	Detroit
5.63 m (18 ft 5 1/2 in)	Dan Ripley	USA	03.03.1979	Fort Worth
5.64 m (18 ft 6 in)	Konstantin Volkov	URS	09.02.1980	Moscow
5.70 m (18 ft 8 1/4 in)	Konstantin Volkov	URS	06.07.1980	Moscow
5.70 m (18 ft 8 1/4 in)	Thierry Vigneron	FRA	18.01.1981	Lyon
5.70 m (18 ft 8 1/4 in)	Thierry Vigneron	FRA	22.02.1981	Grenoble
5.71 m (18 ft 8 3/4 in)	Billy Olson	USA	29.01.1982	Toronto
5.72 m (18 ft 9 in)	Billy Olson	USA	06.02.1982	Louisville
5.73 m (18 ft 9 1/2 in)	Billy Olson	USA	19.02.1982	San Diego
5.74 m (18 ft 9 3/4 in)	Billy Olson	USA	27.02.1982	Kansas City
5.75 m (18 ft 10 1/4 in)	Billy Olson	USA	14.01.1983	Ottawa
5.76 m (18 ft 10 3/4 in)	Billy Olson	USA	21.01.1983	Inglewood
5.80 m (19 ft 1/4 in)	Billy Olson	USA	04.02.1983	Toronto
5.81 m (19 ft 1/2 in)	Sergey Bubka	URS	15.01.1984	Vilnius
5.82 m (19 ft 1 in)	Sergey Bubka	URS	01.02.1984	Milan
5.83 m (19 ft 1 1/2 in)	Sergey Bubka	URS	10.02.1984	Inglewood
5.85 m (19 ft 2 1/4 in)	Thierry Vigneron	FRA	04.03.1984	Gothenburg
5.86 m (19 ft 2 1/2 in)	Billy Olson	USA	28.12.1985	Saskatoon
5.87 m (19 ft 3 in)	Sergey Bubka	URS	15.01.1986	Osaka
5.88 m (19 ft 3 1/4 in)	Billy Olson	USA	17.01.1986	Inglewood
5.89 m (19 ft 3 3/4 in) A	Billy Olson	USA	25.01.1986	Albuquerque
5.91 m (19 ft 4 1/2 in)	Joe Dial	USA	01.02.1986	Columbia
5.92 m (19 ft 5 in)	Sergey Bubka	URS	08.02.1986	Moscow
5.93 m (19 ft 5 1/4 in)	Billy Olson	USA	08.02.1986	East Rutherford
5.94 m (19 ft 5 3/4 in)	Sergey Bubka	URS	21.02.1986	Inglewood
5.95 m (19 ft 6 1/4 in)	Sergey Bubka	URS	28.02.1986	New York City
5.96 m (19 ft 6 1/2 in)	Sergey Bubka	URS	15.01.1987	Osaka
IAAF ratified records (since 1987)
5.97 m (19 ft 7 in)	Sergey Bubka	URS	17.03.1987	Turin
6.00 m (19 ft 8 in)	Rodion Gataulin	URS	22.01.1989	Leningrad
6.02 m (19 ft 9 in)	Rodion Gataulin	URS	04.02.1989	Gomel
6.03 m (19 ft 9 1/4 in)	Sergey Bubka	URS	11.02.1989	Osaka
6.05 m (19 ft 10 in)	Sergey Bubka	URS	17.03.1990	Donetsk
6.08 m (19 ft 11 1/4 in)	Sergey Bubka	URS	09.02.1991	Volgograd
6.10 m (20 ft 0 in)	Sergey Bubka	URS	15.03.1991	San Sebastián
6.11 m (20 ft 1/2 in)	Sergey Bubka	URS	19.03.1991	Donetsk
6.12 m (20 ft 3/4 in)	Sergey Bubka	URS	23.03.1991	Grenoble
6.13 m (20 ft 1 1/4 in)	Sergey Bubka	UKR	22.02.1992	Berlin
6.14 m (20 ft 1 1/2 in)	Sergey Bubka	UKR	13.02.1993	Lievin
6.15 m (20 ft 2 in)	Sergey Bubka	UKR	21.02.1993	Donetsk
6.16 m (20 ft 2 1/2 in)	Renaud Lavillenie	FRA	15.02.2014	Donetsk
6.17 m (20 ft 2 3/4 in)	Armand Duplantis	SWE	08.02.2020	Toruń
6.18 m (20 ft 3 1/4 in)	Armand Duplantis	SWE	15.02.2020	Glasgow
6.19 m (20 ft 3 1/2 in)	Armand Duplantis	SWE	07.03.2022	Belgrade
6.20 m (20 ft 4 in)	Armand Duplantis	SWE	20.03.2022	Belgrade
6.22 m (20 ft 4 3/4 in)	Armand Duplantis	SWE	25.02.2023	Clermont-Ferrand
6.27 m (20 ft 6 3/4 in)	Armand Duplantis	SWE	28.02.2025	Clermont-Ferrand
6.31 m (20 ft 8 1/4 in)	Armand Duplantis	SWE	12.03.2026	Uppsala

== Other marks of note ==
=== Demonstration ===
Mark	Athlete	Nat.	Date	Venue
4.01 m (13 ft 1 3/4 in)	Charles Hoff	NOR	11.02.1926	Brooklyn
5.28 m (17 ft 3 3/4 in)	Bob Seagren	USA	22.12.1966	Mobile
5.86 m (19 ft 2 1/2 in)	Larry Jessee	USA	16.10.1985	Newcastle, Australia

=== Unsanctioned meeting ===
Mark	Athlete	Nat.	Date	Venue
5.32 m (17 ft 5 1/4 in)	Herve D'Encausse	FRA	30.03.1967	Paris

=== Dubious professional records ===
Mark	Athlete	Nat.	Date	Venue
3.43 m (11 ft 3 in)	Robert Musgrave	GBR	16.03.1864	Islington
3.50 m (11 ft 5 3/4 in)	Robert Musgrave	GBR	26.03.1869	Islington

=== Professional ===
Mark	Athlete	Nat.	Date	Venue
3.35 m (10 ft 11 3/4 in)	John Allison	GBR	19.04.1867	Islington
3.35 m (10 ft 11 3/4 in)	Robert Musgrave	GBR	19.04.1867	Islington
5.51 m (18 ft 3/4 in) A	Steve Smith	USA	22.02.1974	Salt Lake City
5.53 m (18 ft 1 1/2 in) A	Steve Smith	USA	23.02.1974	Pocatello
5.55 m (18 ft 2 1/2 in)	Steve Smith	USA	17.01.1975	Montreal
5.59 m (18 ft 4 in)	Steve Smith	USA	11.04.1975	Portland
5.61 m (18 ft 4 3/4 in)	Steve Smith	USA	28.05.1975	New York City

== See also ==
- Men's pole vault world record progression
- Women's pole vault indoor world record progression
- List of pole vaulters who reached 6 metres
