= Athletics at the 1973 Summer Universiade – Men's pole vault =

The men's pole vault event at the 1973 Summer Universiade was held at the Central Lenin Stadium in Moscow on 16 and 17 August.

== Medalists ==
Gold	Silver	Bronze
François Tracanelli; France	Yuriy Isakov; Soviet Union; Terry Porter; United States	

== Results ==
=== Qualification ===
Rank	Group	Athlete	Nationality	Result	Notes
?	?	François Tracanelli	France	4.90	
?	?	Terry Porter	United States	4.90	
?	?	David Roberts	United States	4.90	
?	?	Silvio Fraquelli	Italy	4.90	
?	?	Yuriy Isakov	Soviet Union	4.90	
?	?	Jānis Lauris	Soviet Union	4.90	
?	?	Paweł Iwiński	Poland	4.90	
?	?	Mike Bull	Great Britain	4.90	
?	?	Veli Aartolahti	Finland	4.80	
?	?	Roberto Moré	Cuba	4.80	
?	?	Róbert Steinhacker	Hungary	4.60	
?	?	Gianvittore Pontonutti	Italy	4.60	

=== Final ===
Rank	Athlete	Nationality	Result	Notes
1st place, gold medalist(s)	François Tracanelli	France	5.42	NR
2nd place, silver medalist(s)	Yuriy Isakov	Soviet Union	5.30	
2nd place, silver medalist(s)	Terry Porter	United States	5.30	
4	Paweł Iwiński	Poland	5.20	
4	Jānis Lauris	Soviet Union	5.20	
6	Mike Bull	Great Britain	5.10	
7	Silvio Fraquelli	Italy	5.00	
8	Roberto Moré	Cuba	4.80	
	Gianvittore Pontonutti	Italy	NM	
	Róbert Steinhacker	Hungary	NM	
	David Roberts	United States	NM	
	Veli Aartolahti	Finland	NM	
