= 1973 European Athletics Indoor Championships – Men's pole vault =

1973 pole Championship

The men's pole vault event at the 1973 European Athletics Indoor Championships was held on 10 March in Rotterdam.

== Results ==
Rank	Name	Nationality	Result	Notes
1st place, gold medalist(s)	Renato Dionisi	Italy	5.40	
2nd place, silver medalist(s)	Hans-Jürgen Ziegler	West Germany	5.35	NR
3rd place, bronze medalist(s)	Jean-Michel Bellot	France	5.30	
4	Tadeusz Olszewski	Poland	5.30	
5	Hristos Papanikolaou	Greece	5.25	
6	Patrick Abada	France	5.20	
7	Jānis Lauris	Soviet Union	5.20	
8	Silvio Fraquelli	Italy	5.10	
9	Serge Lefebvre	France	5.00	
10	Antti Kalliomäki	Finland	4.80	
11	Flemming Johansen	Denmark	4.60	
	Reinhard Kuretzky	West Germany	NM	
	Kjell Isaksson	Sweden	NM	
	Volker Ohl	West Germany	NM	
	Hans Lagerqvist	Sweden	NM	
