= Athletics at the 1967 Pan American Games – Men's pole vault =

Men's pole vault at the Pan American Games

The men's pole vault event at the 1967 Pan American Games was held in Winnipeg on 5 August.

== Results ==
Rank	Name	Nationality	Result	Notes
1st place, gold medalist(s)	Bob Seagren	United States	4.90	
2nd place, silver medalist(s)	Bob Raftis	Canada	4.75	
3rd place, bronze medalist(s)	Bob Yard	Canada	4.45	
4	Enrico Barney	Argentina	4.45	
5	Arturo Esquerra	Mexico	4.30	
6	César Quintero	Colombia	4.15	
	Daniel Argoitía	Argentina	NM	
	Paul Wilson	United States	DNS	
