= 1972 European Athletics Indoor Championships – Men's pole vault =

The men's pole vault event at the 1972 European Athletics Indoor Championships was held on 12 March in Grenoble.

== Results ==
Rank	Name	Nationality	4.60	4.70	4.80	4.90	5.00	5.10	5.20	5.30	5.35	5.40	5.45	Result	Notes
1st place, gold medalist(s)	Wolfgang Nordwig	East Germany	–	–	–	–	o	–	o	xo	o	xo	xxx	5.40	=CR, NR
2nd place, silver medalist(s)	Hans Lagerqvist	Sweden	–	–	–	xo	–	o	o	o	xxo	xxo	xxx	5.40	
3rd place, bronze medalist(s)	Antti Kalliomäki	Finland	–	–	–	–	o	–	xxo	xxo	xxx			5.30	
4	Yuriy Isakov	Soviet Union	–	–	–	xo	–	o	xo	xxx				5.20	
5	Ignacio Sola	Spain	–	–	o	–	o	xxx						5.00	
6	Mike Bull	Great Britain	–	–	–	–	xo	xxx						5.00	
7	Heinfried Engel	West Germany	–	–	o	–	xxx							4.80	
8	Flemming Johansen	Denmark	xo	o	o	xxx								4.80	
9	Silvio Fraquelli	Italy	xo	–	xxo	xxx								4.80	
10	Robert Steinhacker	Hungary	–	xo	–	xxx								4.70	
	Jean-Michel Bellot	France	–	–	–	xxx								NM	
	Romuald Murawski	Poland	–	–	–	xxx								NM	
