= 1966 AAA Championships =

Outdoor track and field competition

- Dates: 8–9 July 1966
- Host city: London, England
- Venue: White City Stadium
- Level: Senior
- Type: Outdoor

The 1966 AAA Championships was the 1966 edition of the annual outdoor track and field competition organised by the Amateur Athletic Association (AAA). It was held from 8 to 9 July 1966 at White City Stadium in London, England.

== Summary ==
The Championships covered two days of competition. The marathon was held from Windsor to Chiswick and the decathlon event was held in Welwyn Garden City.

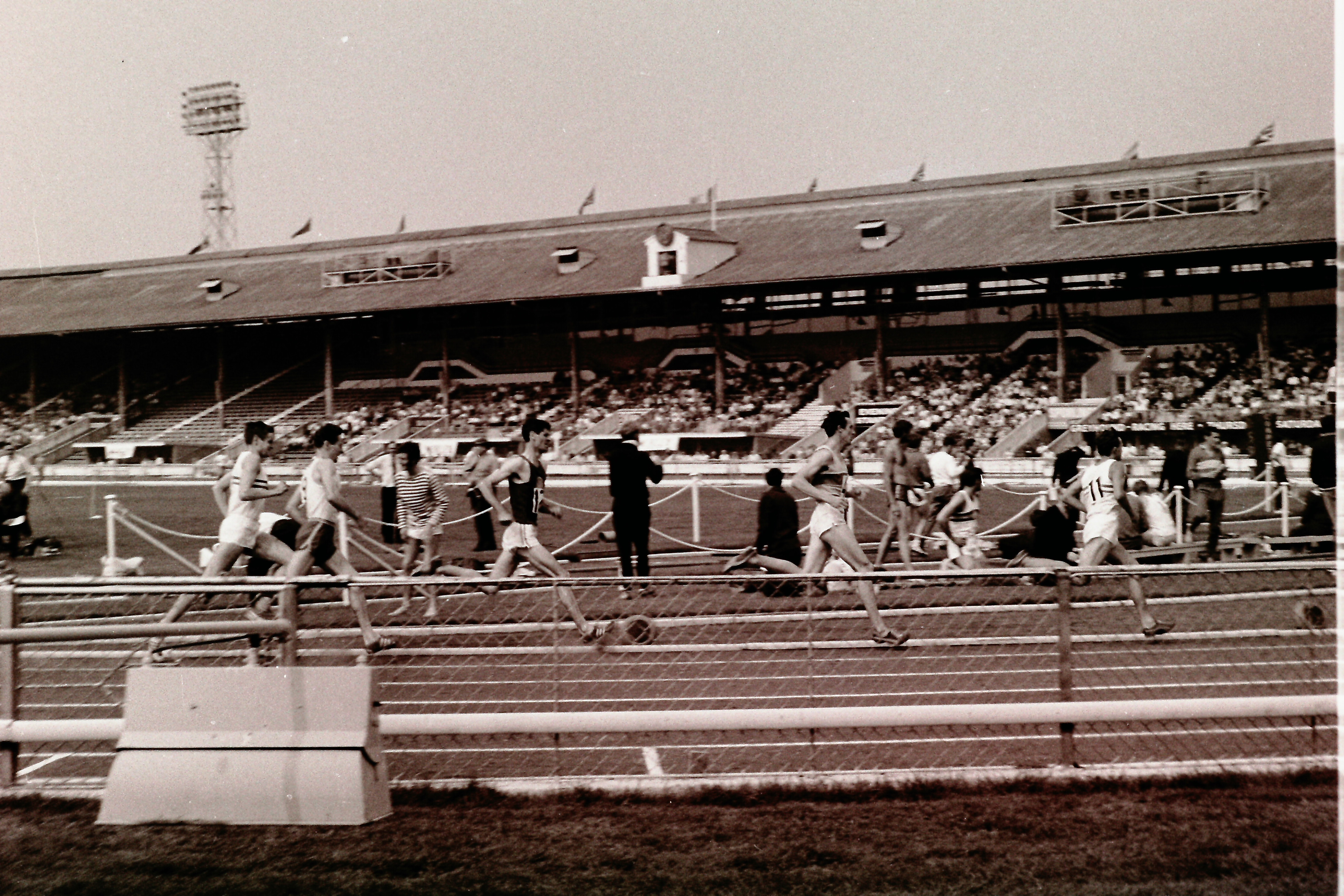
Action during the 1966 Championships

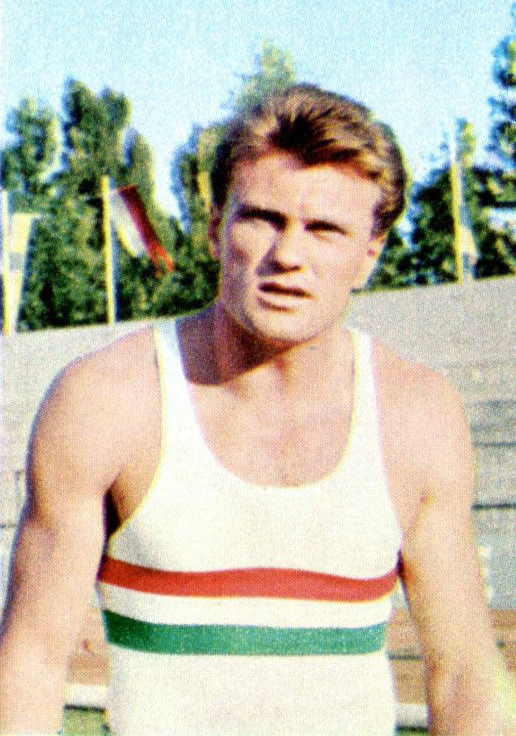
Gyula Zsivótzky won the hammer again

== Results ==
Event	Gold		Silver		Bronze	
100 yards	(South Africa) Paul Nash	9.62	(Poland) Wiesław Maniak	9.70	Barrie Kelly	9.74
220 yards	(South Africa) Paul Nash	21.18	(Scotland) Menzies Campbell	21.60	David Dear	21.66
440 yards	(Trinidad and Tobago) Wendell Mottley	45.93	Tim Graham	47.07	John Adey	47.40
880 yards	(Republic of Ireland) Noel Carroll	1:47.98	Chris Carter	1:48.37	John Boulter	1:48.40
1 mile	(United States) John Camien	4:01.16	Walter Wilkinson	4:01.48	Alan Simpson	4:01.54
3 miles	(Australia) Ron Clarke	12:58.20	(South Africa) Henk Altmann	13:15.83	Dick Taylor	13:17.53
6 miles	(Tunisia) Mohamed Gammoudi	27:23.38	Bruce Tulloh	27:23.78 NR	(Hungary) Lajos Mecser	27:23.82
10 miles	Ron Hill	50:04.0	Cyril Leigh	50:51.6	James Frost	51:27.8
marathon	Graham Taylor	2:19:04	Jim Hogan	2:19:2	Ron Hill	2:20:55
steeplechase	Maurice Herriott	8:37.0	Ernie Pomfret	8:39.0	(Scotland) Lachie Stewart	8:44.8
120y hurdles	Dave Hemery	14.0	Laurie Taitt	14.1	(South Africa) Cornelius Uys	14.2
440y hurdles	John Sherwood	51.10 =NR	Peter Warden	51.50	(United States) Geoff Vanderstock	51.52
2 miles walk	Ron Wallwork	13:35.0	Malcolm Tolley	13:46.4	John Webb	13:54.6
7 miles walk	Paul Nihill	50:52.0	Ron Wallwork	51:02.0	(Wales) Roy Hart	51:58.0
high jump	(Nigeria) Joseph Kadiri	1.981	Gordon Miller	1.956	(Scotland) Crawford Fairbrother	1.956
pole vault	(Northern Ireland) Mike Bull	4.57	Neal Willson	4.34	Martin Higdon	4.34
long jump	(Wales) Lynn Davies	8.06	(Finland) Rainer Stenius	7.91	(Scotland) Hamish Robertson	7.23
triple jump	(Poland) Józef Szmidt	15.99	Fred Alsop	15.30	(Finland) Pertti Pousi	15.23
shot put	(South Africa) Hannes Botha	17.14	(Scotland) Mike Lindsay	16.62	Jeff Teale	16.56
discus throw	Bill Tancred	51.76	Barry King	50.12	(Scotland) Mike Lindsay	49.58
hammer throw	(Hungary) Gyula Zsivótzky	66.04	Howard Payne	61.58	John Lawlor	60.98
javelin throw	(Finland) Jorma Kinnunen	83.22	John FitzSimons	77.14	Dave Travis	70.04
decathlon	Derek Clarke	7001	David Gaskin	6866	(Scotland) Norman Foster	6592

== See also ==
- 1966 WAAA Championships
