= Athletics at the 1971 Pan American Games – Men's pole vault =

Men's pole vault at the Pan American Games

The men's pole vault event at the 1971 Pan American Games was held in Cali on 4 August.

== Results ==
| Rank | Name | Nationality | Result | Notes |
|---|---|---|---|---|
| 1st place, gold medalist(s) | Jan Johnson | United States | 5.33 | |
| 2nd place, silver medalist(s) | David Roberts | United States | 5.20 | |
| 3rd place, bronze medalist(s) | Bruce Simpson | Canada | 4.90 | |
| 4 | Arturo Esquerra | Mexico | 4.70 | |
| 5 | Enrico Barney | Argentina | 4.70 | |
| 6 | Allan Kane | Canada | 4.60 | |
| 7 | Juan Laza | Cuba | 4.60 | |
| 8 | Roberto Moré | Cuba | 4.60 | |
| 9 | Ciro Valdés | Colombia | 4.40 | |
| 10 | Jorge Miranda | Puerto Rico | 4.20 | |
