= 1974 European Athletics Championships – Men's pole vault =

Men's pole vault at the European Athletics Championships

The men's pole vault at the 1974 European Athletics Championships was held in Rome, Italy, at Stadio Olimpico on 6 September 1974.

== Medalists ==
| Gold | Vladimir Kishkun; Soviet Union |
| Silver | Władysław Kozakiewicz; Poland |
| Bronze | Yuriy Isakov; Soviet Union |

== Results ==
=== Final ===
6 September

| Rank | Name | Nationality | Result | Notes |
|---|---|---|---|---|
| 1st place, gold medalist(s) | Vladimir Kishkun | Soviet Union | 5.35 | =CR |
| 2nd place, silver medalist(s) | Władysław Kozakiewicz | Poland | 5.35 | =CR |
| 3rd place, bronze medalist(s) | Yuriy Isakov | Soviet Union | 5.30 | |
| 4 | Antti Kalliomäki | Finland | 5.30 | |
| 4 | Wojciech Buciarski | Poland | 5.30 | |
| 6 | Kjell Isaksson | Sweden | 5.30 | |
| 7 | Tadeusz Ślusarski | Poland | 5.20 | |
| 7 | Janis Lauris | Soviet Union | 5.20 | |
| 9 | Patrick Abada | France | 5.10 | |
| 10 | Brian Hooper | Great Britain | 5.10 | |
| 11 | François Tracanelli | France | 5.00 | |
| 12 | Heinz Busche | West Germany | 5.00 | |
| 13 | Theodoros Tongas | Greece | 4.80 | |
| 14 | Silvio Fraquelli | Italy | 4.80 | |
| | Mike Bull | Great Britain | NH | |

== Participation ==
According to an unofficial count, 15 athletes from 9 countries participated in the event.

- Finland (1)
- France (2)
- Greece (1)
- Italy (1)
- Poland (3)
- Soviet Union (3)
- Sweden (1)
- Great Britain (2)
- West Germany (1)
