= Athletics at the 1975 Summer Universiade – Men's pole vault =

The men's pole vault event at the 1975 Summer Universiade was held at the Stadio Olimpico in Rome on 20 September.

== Results ==
Rank	Athlete	Nationality	Result	Notes
1st place, gold medalist(s)	François Tracanelli	France	5.20	
2nd place, silver medalist(s)	Bruce Simpson	Canada	5.20	
3rd place, bronze medalist(s)	Renato Dionisi	Italy	5.10	
4	Valeriy Boyko	Soviet Union	5.00	
5	Yoshiomi lwama	Japan	5.00	
6	Earl Bell	United States	5.00	
7	Gennadiy Gusyev	Soviet Union	5.00	
8	Róbert Steinhacker	Hungary	4.80	
9	Hiyotaka Konishi	Japan	4.80	
10	Lukas Rettenbacher	Austria	4.80	
11	Armando Chiamulera	Brazil	4.60	
12	Ben Ahmed Rezki	Algeria	4.40	
	Khalil Ibrahim Fahd	Iraq	NM	
	Lakhdar Rahal	Algeria	NM	
