= Wojciech Buciarski =

Polish pole vaulter (born 1950)

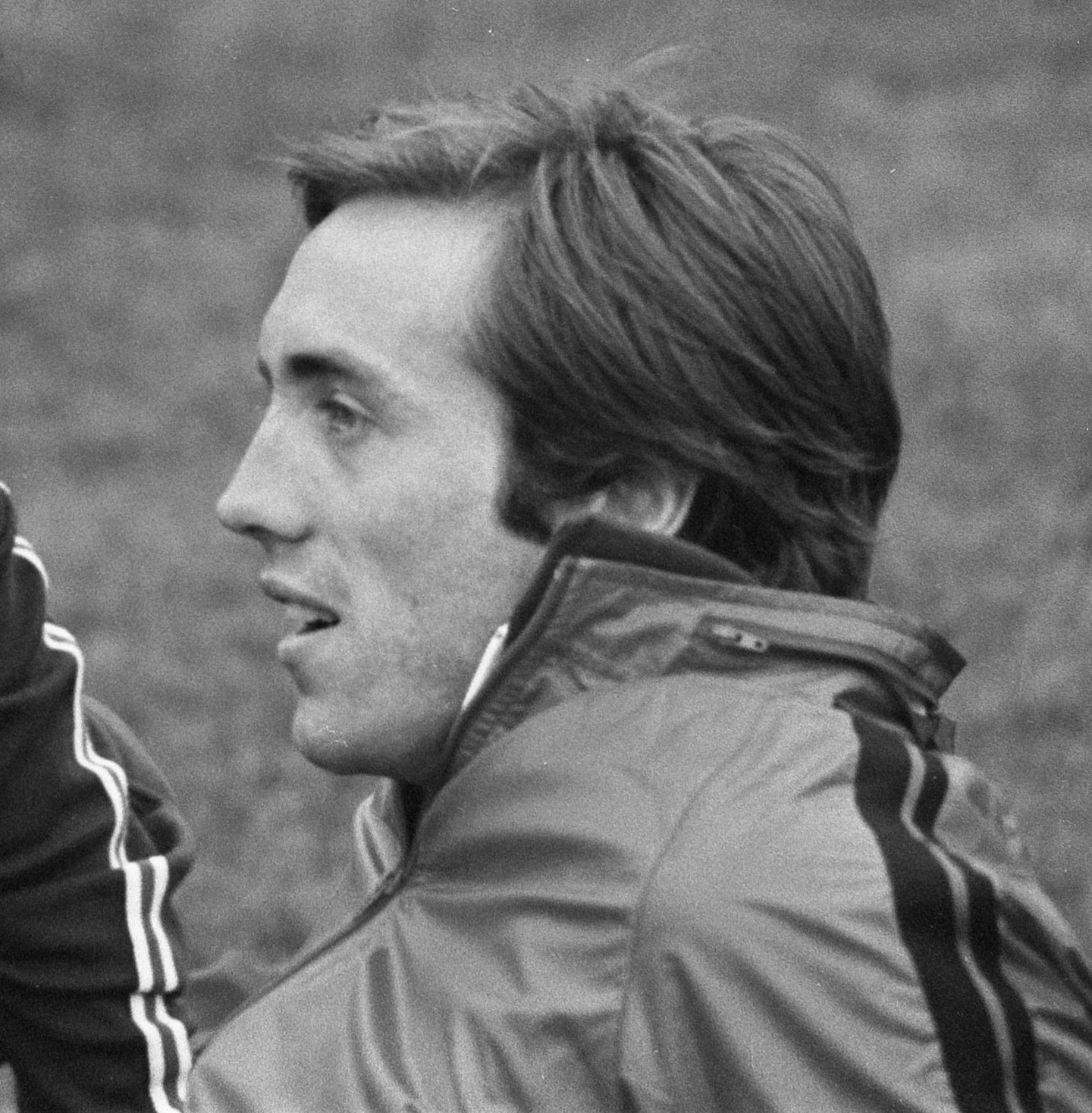
- Buciarski in 1975

Personal information
- Born: 17 April 1950 (age 76) Warsaw, Poland
- Height: 1.80 m (5 ft 11 in)
- Weight: 72 kg (159 lb)

Sport
- Sport: Pole vault
- Club: Skra Warszawa; Legia Warsaw
Medal record
Representing Poland
European Athletics Indoor Championships
Silver medal – second place	1975 Katowice	Pole vault

Wojciech Jan Buciarski (born 17 April 1950) is a retired Polish pole vaulter. He competed at the 1972 and 1976 Olympics and finished in tenth and fifth place, respectively. He won a silver medal at the 1975 European Athletics Indoor Championships with a jump of 5.30 m; the same year he set his personal best at 5.50 m.

Buciarski is the father of Piotr Buciarski, an Olympic pole vaulter competing for Denmark, and father-in-law of Rachel Yurkovich, an American javelin thrower. As of 2013 he was living in Denmark and coaching Cathrine Larsåsen, a Norwegian pole vaulter.

== International competitions ==
Year	Competition	Venue	Position	Notes
Representing Poland
1971	European Indoor Championships	Sofia, Bulgaria	7th	4.80 m
1971	European Championships	Helsinki, Finland	13th (q)	4.90 m
1972	Olympic Games	Munich, West Germany	10th	5.00 m
1973	European Indoor Championships	Rotterdam, Netherlands	10th	4.80 m
1974	European Indoor Championships	Gothenburg, Sweden	4th	5.20 m
1974	European Championships	Rome, Italy	4th	5.30 m
1975	European Indoor Championships	Katowice, Poland	2nd	5.30 m
1976	Olympic Games	Montreal, Canada	5th	5.45 m
1979	European Indoor Championships	Vienna, Austria	5th	5.40 m
