= Itsuo =

- Gender: Male

Origin
- Origin: Japanese
- Meaning: Different meanings depending on the kanji used

Itsuo (written: 逸夫 or 威夫) is a masculine Japanese given name. Notable people with the name include:

- Itsuo Takanezawa (高根沢 威夫; born 1951), Japanese pole vaulter
- Itsuo Tsuda (津田 逸夫; 1914–1984), Japanese philosopher and aikidoka
