= Jeff Teale =

British athlete (1939–1997)

Personal information
- Nationality: British (English)
- Born: 20 December 1939 Newthorpe, North Yorkshire, England
- Died: 16 January 1997 (aged 58)
- Height: 187 cm (6 ft 2 in)
- Weight: 118 kg (260 lb)

Sport
- Sport: Athletics
- Event: shot put
- Club: Doncaster Plant Works AC
Medal record
Representing England
Commonwealth Games
| Silver medal – second place | 1970 Edinburgh | Shot put |

Jeffrey Teale (20 December 1939 – 16 January 1997) was a British international athlete who competed at the 1968 Summer Olympics.

== Biography ==
Teale finished third behind Hannes Botha in the shot put event at the 1966 AAA Championships and second behind Dawid Booysen at the 1967 AAA Championships but by virtue of being the highest placed British athlete at the 1967 event, was considered the British shot put champion.

He won the AAA title outright at the 1968 AAA Championships, not long before he represented Great Britain at the 1968 Olympic Games in Mexico City.

Teale won a final AAA title at the 1968 AAA Championships and represented England and winning a silver medal in the shot put at the 1970 British Commonwealth Games in Edinburgh, Scotland.

In 1974, he was suspended for life by the British Amateur Athletic board after admitting in a newspaper article that he used steroids. During the period that he used steroids (1967-1972) he won a silver medal which under current athletics legislation would not recognised today.
