= Athletics at the 1984 Summer Olympics – Men's pole vault =

Men's pole vault at the Games of the XXIII Olympiad
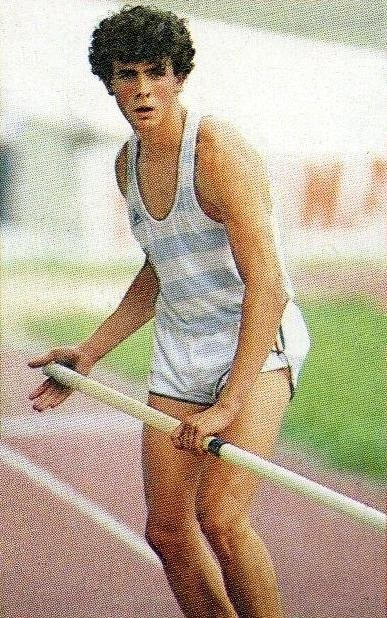
- Pierre Quinon (1986)
- Venue: Los Angeles Memorial Coliseum
- Date: 6 August 1984 (qualifying); 8 August 1984 (final)
- Competitors: 19 from 13 nations
- Winning height: 5.75

Medalists
1st place, gold medalist(s)		Pierre Quinon; France
2nd place, silver medalist(s)		Mike Tully; United States
3rd place, bronze medalist(s)		Earl Bell; United States
3rd place, bronze medalist(s)		Thierry Vigneron; France

The men's pole vault event at the 1984 Summer Olympics in Los Angeles, California had an entry list of 19 competitors from 13 nations, with two qualifying groups (19 jumpers) before the final (12) took place on Wednesday August 8, 1984. The maximum number of athletes per nation had been set at 3 since the 1930 Olympic Congress. The event was won by Pierre Quinon of France, the nation's first medal in the men's pole vault. France also took one of the two bronze medals after Thierry Vigneron tied with Earl Bell of the United States for third. Mike Tully, also American, earned silver. Bell and Tully continued the American streak of podium appearances in the event every time the United States competed.

== Background ==
This was the 20th appearance of the event, which is one of 12 athletics events to have been held at every Summer Olympics. The returning finalists from the 1980 Games were seventh-place finisher Thierry Vigneron of France and tenth-place finisher Miro Zalar of Sweden. Earl Bell of the United States, who had been a finalist in 1976 but was kept out of the Moscow Games by the boycott, also returned. Poland and the Soviet Union had become powers in the event in the late 1970s and early 1980s; the Soviet-led boycott kept out significant competitors including the world champion and world record holder Sergey Bubka. The United States had dominated the event through 1968 and still maintained perennially contending teams; Bell and Mike Tully were among the favorites. France also had a strong team and was the only nation of the four to compete in both 1980 and 1984; Vigneron's finish in Moscow had been disappointing, and he sought a better result in Los Angeles along with teammate Pierre Quinon.

The People's Republic of China and the Virgin Islands each made their men's pole vaulting debut. The United States made its 19th appearance, most of any nation, having missed only the boycotted 1980 Games.

== Competition format ==
The competition used the two-round format introduced in 1912, with results cleared between rounds. Vaulters received three attempts at each height. Ties were broken by the countback rule. At the time, total attempts was used after total misses.

In the qualifying round, the bar was set at 5.10 metres, 5.20 metres, 5.30 metres, 5.35 metres, 5.40 metres, and 5.45 metres. All vaulters clearing 5.45 metres advanced to the final. If fewer than 12 cleared that height, the top 12 (including ties) advanced.

In the final, the bar was set at 5.10 metres, 5.20 metres, 5.30 metres, 5.40 metres, and then increased by 5 centimetres as a time.

== Records ==
Prior to the competition, the existing world and Olympic records were as follows.

World record	Sergey Bubka (URS)	5.90	London, United Kingdom	13 July 1984
Olympic record	Władysław Kozakiewicz (POL)	5.78	Moscow, Soviet Union	30 July 1980

No new world or Olympic records were set during the competition. The following national records were established during the competition:

Nation	Athlete	Round	Time
Virgin Islands	Brian Morrissette	Qualifying	5.20

== Schedule ==
All times are Pacific Daylight Time (UTC-7)

Date	Time	Round
Monday, 6 August 1984	9:30	Qualifying
Wednesday, 8 August 1984	16:10	Final

== Results ==
Key

- o = Height cleared
- x = Height failed
- – = Height passed
- r = Retired
- SB = Season's best
- PB = Personal best
- NR = National record
- AR = Area record
- OR = Olympic record
- WR = World record
- WL = World lead
- NM = No mark
- DNS = Did not start
- DQ = Disqualified

=== Qualifying round ===
The qualifying round was held on Monday August 6, 1984. Qualification rule: Qualifying performance 5.45 (Q) or at least 12 best performers (q) advance to the final.

Rank	Group	Athlete	Nation	5.10	5.20	5.30	5.35	5.40	5.45	Height	Notes
1	A	Thierry Vigneron	France	–	–	–	o	–	o	5.45	Q
1	A	Earl Bell	United States	–	–	–	o	–	o	5.45	Q
1	A	Mike Tully	United States	–	–	–	o	–	o	5.45	Q
4	A	Alberto Ruiz	Spain	xo	–	xo	–	xo	xxo	5.45	Q
5	A	Pierre Quinon	France	–	–	xo	–	o	–	5.40	q
6	B	Kimmo Pallonen	Finland	–	o	o	xo	xo	–	5.40	q
7	A	Felix Böhni	Switzerland	–	–	o	–	xxo	xxx	5.40	q
8	A	Tom Hintnaus	Brazil	–	–	–	o	–	xxx	5.35	q
9	B	Mauro Barella	Italy	o	o	xo	xxo	–	–	5.35	q
10	A	Serge Ferreira	France	–	–	o	–	xxx	—	5.30	q
10	A	Doug Lytle	United States	–	–	o	xxx	—		5.30	q
10	B	Yang Weimin	China	o	o	o	–	xxx	—	5.30	q
10	B	Jeff Gutteridge	Great Britain	o	–	o	xxx	—		5.30	q
10	B	Tomomi Takahashi	Japan	–	–	xxo	–	xxx	—	5.30	q
15	B	Brian Morrissette	Virgin Islands	o	o	x–	xx	—		5.20	NR
16	B	Keith Stock	Great Britain	xo	xo	xxx	—			5.20	
17	B	Ji Zebiao	China	xo	xxx	—				5.10	
18	B	Edgardo Rivera	Puerto Rico	xxo	–	x–	xx	—		5.10	
—	A	Miro Zalar	Sweden	–	–	xxx	—			No mark	
—	B	Alfonso Cano	Spain	DNS							

=== Final ===
The final was held on Wednesday August 8, 1984.

Rank	Athlete	Nation	5.10	5.20	5.30	5.40	5.45	5.50	5.55	5.60	5.65	5.70	5.75	5.80	Height
1st place, gold medalist(s)	Pierre Quinon	France	–	–	–	–	xo	–	–	–	x–	o	o	xxx	5.75
2nd place, silver medalist(s)	Mike Tully	United States	–	–	–	–	o	–	o	–	xxo	–	–	xxx	5.65
3rd place, bronze medalist(s)	Earl Bell	United States	–	–	–	o	–	o	–	o	–	xxx	—		5.60
3rd place, bronze medalist(s)	Thierry Vigneron	France	–	–	–	o	–	–	–	o	–	xxx	—		5.60
5	Kimmo Pallonen	Finland	–	–	xo	–	xo	–	xxx	—					5.45
6	Doug Lytle	United States	–	–	–	o	–	xxx	—						5.40
7	Felix Böhni	Switzerland	–	–	o	–	–	xxx	—						5.30
8	Mauro Barella	Italy	xxo	–	xxo	xxx	—								5.30
9	Alberto Ruiz	Spain	–	o	–	xxx	—								5.20
10	Yang Weimin	China	xo	xxx	—										5.10
11	Jeff Gutteridge	Great Britain	xxo	–	xxx	—									5.10
—	Tom Hintnaus	Brazil	–	–	–	xxx	—								No mark
—	Serge Ferreira	France	–	–	xxx	—									No mark
—	Tomomi Takahashi	Japan	–	–	xxx	—									No mark

== See also ==
- 1982 Men's European Championships Pole Vault (Athens)
- 1983 Men's World Championships Pole Vault (Helsinki)
- 1984 Men's Friendship Games Pole Vault (Moscow)
- 1986 Men's European Championships Pole Vault (Stuttgart)
- 1987 Men's World Championships Pole Vault (Rome)
