= 1971 European Athletics Indoor Championships – Men's pole vault =

The men's pole vault event at the 1971 European Athletics Indoor Championships was held on 14 March in Sofia.

== Results ==
Rank	Name	Nationality	4.40	4.50	4.60	4.70	4.80	4.90	5.00	5.10	5.20	5.30	5.35	5.40	Result	Notes
1st place, gold medalist(s)	Wolfgang Nordwig	East Germany	–	–	–	–	–	–	xo	–	o	o	xo	o	5.40	WB
2nd place, silver medalist(s)	Kjell Isaksson	Sweden	–	–	–	–	–	–	xo	–	xo	o	xxo	xxx	5.35	
3rd place, bronze medalist(s)	Yuriy Isakov	Soviet Union	–	–	–	–	xxo	–	xo	–	xo	o	xxx		5.30	
4	Heinfried Engel	West Germany	–	–	–	–	o	–	o	o	xxx				5.10	
5	Antti Kalliomäki	Finland	–	–	–	–	o	–	o	–	xxx				5.00	
6	Yuriy Khanafin	Soviet Union	–	–	–	–	o	–	o	xxx					5.00	
7	Wojciech Buciarski	Poland	–	–	–	–	o	–	xxx						4.80	
7	Hans Lagerqvist	Sweden	–	–	–	–	o	–	xxx						4.80	
9	Zygmunt Dobrosz	Poland	–	–	xo	–	o	–	xxx						4.80	
10	Nikolay Keydan	Soviet Union	–	–	o	–	xo	–	xxx						4.80	
11	Ignacio Sola	Spain	–	–	xo	–	xxo	–	xxx						4.80	
12	Dinu Piștalu	Romania	–	–	–	xo	–	xxx							4.70	
13	Hans-Jürgen Ziegler	West Germany	–	–	o	–	xxx								4.60	
14	Michel Ollivary	France	–	–	xxo	–	xxx								4.60	
15	Jesper Tørring	Denmark	o	xxx											4.40	
	Christos Papanikolaou	Greece													NM	
