= Serge Ferreira =

French pole vaulter

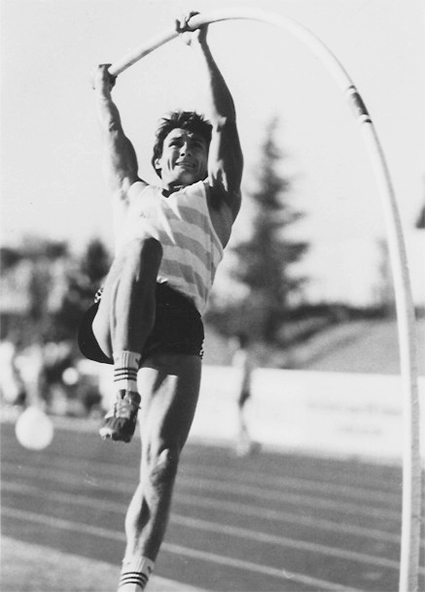

Personal information
- Nationality: French
- Born: 11 August 1959 (age 66)

Sport
- Sport: Athletics
- Event: Pole vault

Serge Ferreira (born 11 August 1959) is a French athlete. He competed in the men's pole vault at the 1984 Summer Olympics.
