= Yoshiomi Iwama =

Japanese pole vaulter

Personal information
- Nationality: Japanese
- Born: 3 August 1952 (age 73)

Sport
- Sport: Athletics
- Event: Pole vault
Medal record
Men's athletics
Representing Japan
Asian Championships
| Gold medal – first place | 1975 Seoul | Pole vault |

Yoshiomi Iwama (Japanese: 岩間 良臣, Hepburn: Iwama Yoshiomi; born 3 August 1952) is a Japanese track and field athlete. He competed in the men's pole vault at the 1976 Summer Olympics.
