= International Track Association =

Track and field organization (1972–1976)

The International Track Association (ITA) was a professional track and field organization that existed in the United States from 1972 to 1976.

The ITA initially attracted many of the big track and field stars of the day to run in its meets and initially garnered much attention for its meets. However, a lack of television money and the inability to attract new stars after the 1976 Olympics led to its downfall. ITA's President Michael F O'Hara announced the league folding August 1976.

== Formation ==
The International Track Association (ITA) was formed in 1972 after the Munich Olympics. The ITA brought professionalism, defined as athletes making an income from their athletic performance, to the sport of track and field. The aim of the ITA was to have a series of meets involving about 50 top athletes forming a track and field tour similar to those existing in golf and tennis. The meets were initially scheduled only in the US and Canada but future expansion was envisaged to include meets in Europe and the Far East.

Prior to the formation of the ITA, all track and field athletes were required to maintain status as "amateur" athletes, so required by the Olympic creed of the day. This meant any compensation that they may have received from their sport was "under the table." As a result, many American athletes' careers were frequently cut short shortly after their subsidized participation at the collegiate level ended, while Eastern Bloc and other international athletes frequently had their careers extended, subsidized ostensibly by participation in the Army or police forces. Pressure from the athletes had been mounting for years to find an answer. Track and Field News discussed the subject with its cover article "Take the Money and Run" in November 1971.

The ITA was the brainchild of Michael O'Hara who had gained experience in the sports of basketball and ice hockey of creating new rival leagues in competition to existing established leagues, namely the American Basketball Association and the World Hockey Association respectively.

The ITA was officially launched on October 25, 1972. It received immediate hostility from the then governing body in the United States for track and field the AAU. The AAU banned all athletes and officials who took part in ITA competitions and put pressure on television companies not to televise the ITA meets. The athletes were also banned from competing in any Olympic Games. To help protect the athletes from retribution by the AAU if the venture failed, O'Hara placed them on negative covenant contracts – here they promised not to run for anyone else rather than to run for the ITA – with the contracts only going into legal effect if the venture took off.

O'Hara for his part tried to smooth relations with the AAU by avoiding scheduling conflicts and promising not to sign-up college athletes.

== Athletics competition ==
The ITA signed many of the top track and field athletes of the day including notably:

- Jim Ryun, 1500 m/ miler runner – who also acted as a publicist;
- Bob Seagren, pole vaulter;
- Lee Evans, 400 m runner;
- Larry James, 400 m runner;
- Brian Oldfield, shot putter;
- Kip Keino, 1500 m /miler runner;
- Ben Jipcho, 1500 m/miler runner;
- Marty Liquori, long-distance runner who also acted as master of ceremonies for the meets.

The first ITA meet happened on March 3, 1973, in Idaho State University's Minidome and it saw immediate success with three indoor world bests:

- 100 m by Warren Edmonson at 10.2;
- 600 m by Lee Evans at 1:16.7;
- high jump by John Radetich at 7'-4 3/4".

These records, like all those recorded by the openly-professional ITA athletes, would never be ratified as world records by the world governing body for track and field at the time, the International Amateur Athletic Federation, because they were achieved by professional athletes in competitions IAAF did not sanction.

The attraction to the athletes of the ITA was not only the prize money but also the freedom to pursue other commercial opportunities, like endorsement advertising, that were denied to them if they stayed an amateur.

On March 30, 1973, the ITA meet was in Portland, Oregon with Leon Coleman winning the 60 yard hurdles in 7.14; Wyomia Tyus-Simburg winning the 60 yard dash in 6.8 and Warren Edmonson in 6.1; Kip Keino won the 2-mile in 8:46.0; Lee Evans won the 500 yard in 57.5; and Brian Oldfield the SP with 68'-8 1/2"

During its existence, the ITA saw much high-quality competition including 34 world bests. Of particular note were Brian Oldfield's indoor and outdoor records in the shot put. The indoor record happened on 4 April 1975 in Daly City, California. Oldfield achieved a distance of 72 ft 6 1/2 in (22.11 m). The outdoor record happened on 10 May that year in El Paso, Texas. Here Oldfield achieved the remarkable distance of 75 ft 0 in (22.86 m). He also had another put of 73 ft 1 in (22.28 m). The official world record at the time was 71 ft 8 1/2 in (21.86 m) by Terry Albritton. This put was voted by Track and Field News as their outstanding single performance of 1975. Other notable world bests achieved indoors included those by John Radetich in the high jump and Steve Smith in the pole vault.

Though there was undoubtedly high-quality competition, there was also much competition that was inferior to that seen in the amateur meets of the time. The meets often also had novelty events, for example having the shot putter Brian Oldfield racing against female sprinters over 30 m. In the short-term this attracted spectators but longer-term it damaged the credibility of the ITA. The lack of female athletes and female events in general was also damaging. One famous female athlete who personally suffered from this lack of competition was Wyomia Tyus-Simburg who had been tempted out of retirement to run for the ITA and was unbeaten in their 1974 season.

National Football League Hall of Famer Bob Hayes competed and won several 40-yard dash competitions. Hayes best performance was a 4.3 altitude-aided mark.

Middle Distance Runner and Olympian Dave Wottle competed from 1974 to 1976 on the tour.

Hurdler and Olympian Rod Milburn competed on the tour several years and beat Lance Babb in ITA's final competition. Milburn held the professional record in the sprint hurdles at 13.0.

== Rivalries ==
The ITA spectators were promised the renewal of popular track and field rivalries of the day that would lead to new record performances. The rivalry between Bob Seagren and Steve Smith in the pole vault was added extra spice by their well-known personal animosity. Jim Ryun versus Kip Keino in the 1500 m/mile was another such rivalry, though it was restricted solely to the athletic competition in their case. However, injury and a lack of form for Ryan and Keino's retirement meant that Ben Jipcho would domininate the event. This became typical of many other events where there was less and less meaningful competition.

== End ==
The ITA successfully delivered 51 meets during its existence watched by 500,000 spectators and 300 million television viewers. However, the venture struggled from organizational difficulties as well as spotty participation from its star athletes.

Ultimately, the ITA suffered because it could not attract enough television money and the money received through ticket sales was not enough to sustain it. Television companies had been reluctant to support the ITA because of their wish not to offend the AAU and not to be seen to damage American chances at the next Olympics.

The death knell came at the end of 1976 when the ITA was unable to sign any new stars after the Montreal Olympics. A particular blow was the failure to sign three New Zealand middle-distance running stars, John Walker, Dick Quax and Rod Dixon.

Athletes had become more reluctant to turn professional when it became clear that they could often earn more from under-the-table payments when competing at so-called amateur meets than they could from money earned openly at the ITA meets. For example, the high jumper Dwight Stones is quoted as saying in explanation of why he would not sign, "Why take a cut in salary?"

The final ITA meet occurred on August 25, 1976, in Gresham, Oregon. The final three meets of the 1976 season were cancelled.

== Legacy ==
The main legacy of the ITA was the empowerment it gave athletes to challenge the existing shamateurism by forming a framework for the movement that eventually allowed athletes to get paid for their participation in sport.

Many of the ITA's promotional ideas were seen as quirky in their day but are now staples of the World Athletics Diamond League, for example, and include such innovations as prize money and a points-standing system over a season-long tour.

After the ITA's demise, many of the participating athletes sued to regain their "amateur" status in order to continue to participate in the sport. After 1988, the International Olympic Committee voted to allow athletes to be paid for their efforts if this was allowed by the governing bodies of the individual sports, ending the amateur limitation on the Olympics.
