= Roberto Moré =

Cuban pole vaulter

Personal information
- Full name: Roberto B. Moré Lozano
- Nationality: Puerto Rican
- Born: 11 February 1950 (age 76) Morón, Cuba
- Height: 1.72 m (5 ft 8 in)
- Weight: 70 kg (154 lb)

Sport
- Sport: Athletics
- Event: Pole vault
Medal record
Representing Cuba
Pan American Games
Bronze medal – third place	1975 Mexico City	Pole vault
Central American and Caribbean Games
Gold medal – first place	1970 Panama City	Pole vault
Gold medal – first place	1974 Santo Domingo	Pole vault

Roberto Moré Lozano (born 11 February 1950) is a Cuban former pole vaulter who competed in the 1976 Summer Olympics.

His personal best in the event is 5.33 metres set in 1976.

== International competitions ==
Year	Competition	Venue	Position	Notes
Representing Cuba
1969	Central American and Caribbean Championships	Havana, Cuba	1st	4.52 m
1970	Central American and Caribbean Games	Panama City, Panama	1st	DNF
1971	Central American and Caribbean Championships	Kingston, Jamaica	1st	4.80 m
1971	Pan American Games	Cali, Colombia	8th	4.60 m
1973	Central American and Caribbean Championships	Santo Domingo, Dominican Republic	2nd	4.85 m
1973	Universiade	Moscow, Soviet Union	8th	4.80 m
1974	Central American and Caribbean Games	Santo Domingo, Dominican Republic	1st	4.95 m
1975	Pan American Games	Mexico City, Mexico	3rd	5.20 m
1976	Olympic Games	Montreal, Canada	12th (q)	5.10 m^{1}
1977	Central American and Caribbean Championships	Xalapa, Mexico	1st	4.93 m
1977	Universiade	Sofia, Bulgaria	9th	5.00 m

^{1}No mark in the final
