= Edgardo Rivera =

Puerto Rican pole vaulter

Personal information
- Full name: Edgardo Rivera Meléndez
- Nationality: Puerto Rican
- Born: 8 May 1953 (age 72)
- Height: 1.81 m (5 ft 11 in)
- Weight: 71 kg (157 lb)

Sport
- Sport: Athletics
- Event: Pole vault

Edgardo Rivera Meléndez (born 8 May 1953) is a Puerto Rican athlete. He competed in the men's pole vault at the 1984 Summer Olympics.

His personal best in the event is 5.35 metres set in 1984.

== International competitions ==
Year	Competition	Venue	Position	Notes
Representing Puerto Rico
1974	Central American and Caribbean Games	Santo Domingo, Dominican Republic	3rd	4.55 m
1978	Central American and Caribbean Games	Medellín, Colombia	4th	4.70 m
1979	Central American and Caribbean Championships	Guadalajara, Mexico	2nd	4.60 m
1979	Pan American Games	San Juan, Puerto Rico	–	NM
1981	Central American and Caribbean Championships	Santo Domingo, Dominican Republic	3rd	4.60 m
1982	Central American and Caribbean Games	Havana, Cuba	4th	4.90 m
1983	Central American and Caribbean Championships	Havana, Cuba	1st	5.20 m
1983	Pan American Games	Caracas, Venezuela	5th	5.00 m
1984	Olympic Games	Los Angeles, United States	18th (q)	5.10 m
1986	Central American and Caribbean Games	Santiago, Dominican Republic	4th	4.80 m
