= Bubka =

Bubka (Ukrainian: Бу́бка) is a Ukrainian surname. Notable people with the surname include:

- Sergey Bubka (born 1963), Ukrainian pole vaulter
- Vasiliy Bubka (born 1960), Ukrainian pole vaulter, brother of Sergey
- Oleksandr Bubka (born 1986), Ukrainian pole vaulter, son of Vasiliy
- Sergei Bubka (born 1987), Ukrainian tennis player, son of Sergey
