= Athletics at the 1970 British Commonwealth Games – Men's pole vault =

Men's pole vault at the 1970 British Commonwealth Games
- Venue: Meadowbank Stadium, Edinburgh
- Dates: 23 July 1970

Medalists
gold medal	Mike Bull	Northern Ireland
silver medal	Allan Kane	Canada
bronze medal	Robert Raftis	Canada

The men's pole vault event at the 1970 British Commonwealth Games was held on 23 July at the Meadowbank Stadium in Edinburgh, Scotland.

== Results ==
Final results
Rank	Name	Nationality	Height	Notes
1st place, gold medalist(s)	Mike Bull	Northern Ireland	5.10	
2nd place, silver medalist(s)	Allan Kane	Canada	4.90	
3rd place, bronze medalist(s)	Robert Raftis	Canada	4.90	
4	Ray Boyd	Australia	4.85	
5	Bruce Simpson	Canada	4.60	
6	Gordon Rule	Scotland	4.50	
7	Stuart Tufton	Scotland	4.50	
8	David Lease	Wales	4.50	
9	David Stevenson	Scotland	4.40	
10	Steve Chappell	England	4.30	
11	Martin Higdon	England	4.30	
12	Adeola Aboyade-Cole	Nigeria	3.80	
13	Patrick Oriana	Uganda	3.70	
