= Athletics at the 1983 Pan American Games – Men's pole vault =

Men's pole vault at the Pan American Games

The men's pole vault event at the 1983 Pan American Games was held in Caracas, Venezuela on 26 August.

== Results ==
Rank	Name	Nationality	Result	Notes
1st place, gold medalist(s)	Mike Tully	United States	5.45	
2nd place, silver medalist(s)	Jeff Buckingham	United States	5.25	
3rd place, bronze medalist(s)	Tom Hintnaus	Brazil	5.20	
4	George Barber	Canada	5.10	
5	Edgardo Rivera	Puerto Rico	5.00	
6	Fernando Ruocco	Uruguay	4.85	
7	Manuel Fuentes	Venezuela	4.65	
	Brian Morrissette	United States Virgin Islands	NM	
