= William K. Bell =

American pole vaulter

Personal information
- Born: March 19, 1922 Benton, Arkansas, United States
- Died: August 23, 2020 (aged 98) Jonesboro, Arkansas, United States
- Relative: Earl Bell (son)

Sport
- Sport: Pole vault

William K. Bell Sr (March 19, 1922 – August 23, 2020) was an American pole vaulter who set multiple world records for the age categories of 75–79, 80–84. 85-89 and 90–94. He was the father of pole vaulter Earl Bell.

William K. Bell was born on March 19, 1922, in Benton, Arkansas to Guy Gifford and Lila Hogue Bell. He died on August 23, 2020, in Jonesboro, Arkansas.
