= Martin Higdon =

British pole vaulter)

Personal information
- Nationality: British (English)
- Born: Q3. 1943 Gloucester, England

Sport
- Sport: Athletics
- Event: Pole vault
- Club: Hercules Wimbledon AC

Martin Higdon (born 1943) is a former international athlete who competed at the Commonwealth Games.

== Biography ==
Higdon was a member of the Hercules Wimbledon Athletic Club and specialised in the pole vault. A college lecturer at Loughborough College by profession, he represented England and Great Britain at international level.

Higdon was twice a podium finisher at the AAA Championships, third behind Mike Bull at the 1966 AAA Championships and runner-up behind Bull at the 1969 AAA Championships.

Higdon represented the England team at the 1970 British Commonwealth Games in Edinburgh, Scotland, where he competed in the pole vault event.
