= Antti Kalliomäki =

Finnish athlete, politician

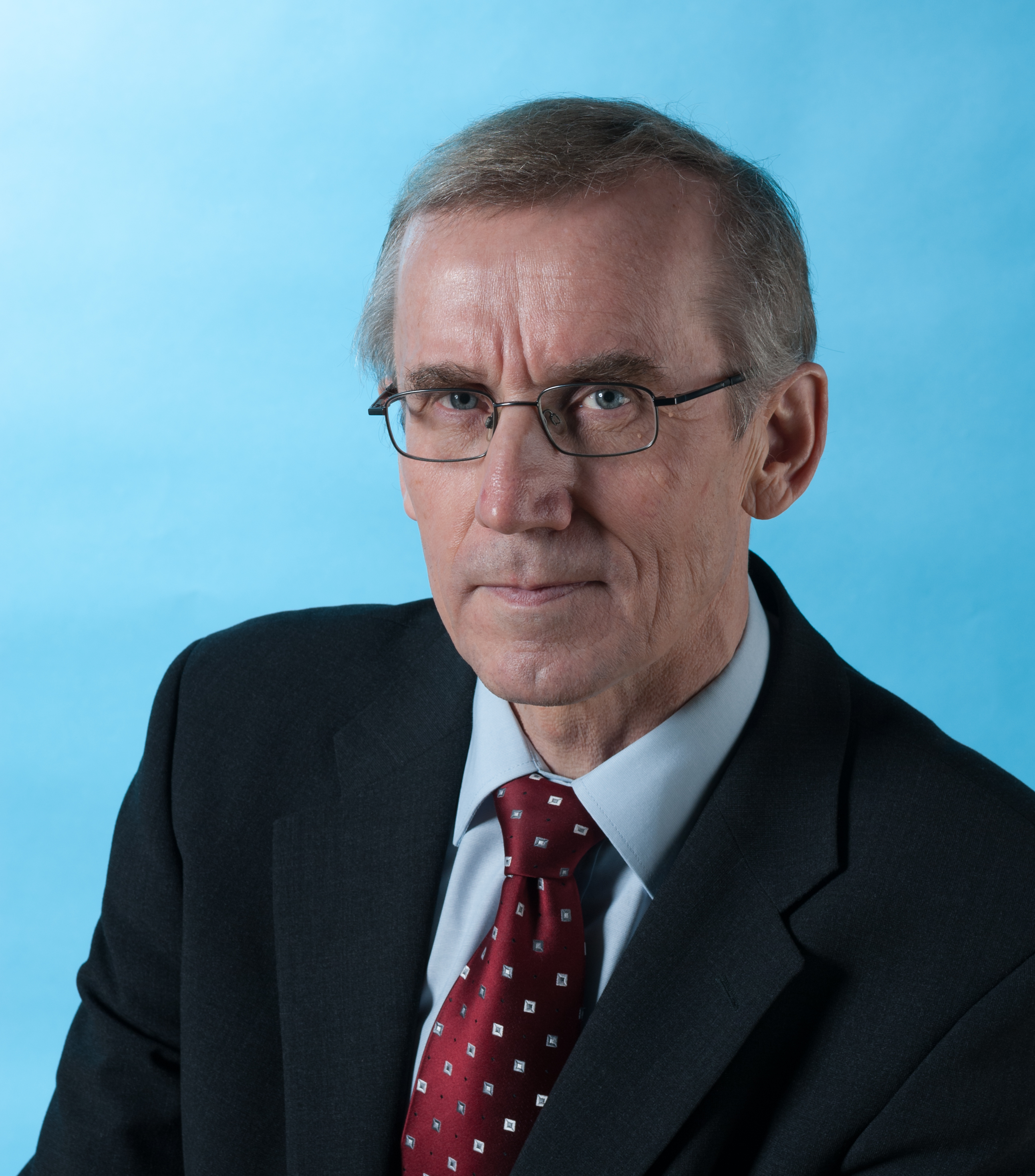

Personal information
- Born: 8 January 1947 (age 79) Siikainen, Finland
Medal record
Men's athletics
Representing Finland
Olympic Games
Silver medal – second place	1976 Montréal	Pole vault
European Championships
Silver medal – second place	1978 Prague	Pole vault
European Indoor Championships
Gold medal – first place	1975 Katowice	Pole vault
Silver medal – second place	1974 Gothenburg	Pole vault
Silver medal – second place	1976 Munich	Pole vault
Silver medal – second place	1977 San Sebastián	Pole vault
Bronze medal – third place	1972 Grenoble	Pole vault

Antti Kalliomäki (born 8 January 1947) is a Finnish politician and former athlete. Kalliomäki is a member of the Social Democratic Party of Finland (SDP) and was a member of the Parliament of Finland from 1983 until 2011. He retired from politics in 2011.

== Politics ==
He served as Minister of Trade and Industry in the first Lipponen cabinet from 1995 to 1999. Kalliomäki was the Deputy Prime Minister and the head of SDP ministerial group in Jäätteenmäki and first Vanhanen cabinets. He hold the posts of Minister of Finance from April 2003 to September 2005 until he was replaced by the new Chairman of SDP, Eero Heinäluoma. Kalliomäki continued in the cabinet as the Minister of Education from September 2005 to April 2007.

Kalliomäki was the chairman of the SDP parliamentary group from March 1991 to April 1995 and again from March 1999 until April 2003. In municipal politics, Kallomäki was member of Vantaa city council 1984–2000 and was in the municipal council of Nurmijärvi from 2005 until his retirement.

== Athletics ==
Before his political career, Kalliomäki was a successful athlete and won the silver medal in pole vault at the 1976 Summer Olympics in Montreal and participated also in the 1972 and 1980 Olympic Games. His personal record is 566 cm.

== International competitions ==
Year	Competition	Venue	Position	Notes
Representing Finland
1966	European Junior Games	Odessa, Soviet Union	1st	4.60 m
1971	European Indoor Championships	Sofia, Bulgaria	5th	5.00 m
1971	European Championships	Helsinki, Finland	9th	5.00 m
1972	European Indoor Championships	Grenoble, France	3rd	5.30 m
1972	Olympic Games	Munich, West Germany	1st (q)	5.10 m^{1}
1973	European Indoor Championships	Rotterdam, Netherlands	10th	4.80 m
1974	European Indoor Championships	Gothenburg, Sweden	2nd	5.30 m
1974	European Championships	Rome, Italy	4th	5.30 m
1975	European Indoor Championships	Katowice, Poland	1st	5.35 m
1976	European Indoor Championships	Munich, West Germany	2nd	5.40 m
1976	Olympic Games	Montreal, Canada	2nd	5.50 m
1977	European Indoor Championships	San Sebastián, Spain	2nd	5.31 m
1978	European Championships	Prague, Czechoslovakia	2nd	5.50 m
1980	European Indoor Championships	Sindelfingen, West Germany	6th	5.50 m
1980	Olympic Games	Moscow, Soviet Union	–	NM
1982	European Championships	Athens, Greece	–	NM

^{1}No mark in the final
