= Athletics at the 1982 Commonwealth Games – Men's pole vault =

Men's pole vault at the Commonwealth Games

The men's pole vault event at the 1982 Commonwealth Games was held on 8 October at the QE II Stadium in Brisbane, Australia.

== Results ==
Rank	Name	Nationality	Result	Notes
1st place, gold medalist(s)	Ray Boyd	Australia	5.20	GR
2nd place, silver medalist(s)	Jeff Gutteridge	England	5.20	GR
3rd place, bronze medalist(s)	Graham Eggleton	Scotland	5.20	GR
4	Bruce Simpson	Canada	5.10	
5	Keith Stock	England	4.85	
6	Andrew Stewart	Australia	4.85	
7	Kieran McKee	New Zealand	4.70	
	Dave Steen	Canada	NM	
	Daley Thompson	England	DNS	
