= Yang Weimin =

Chinese pole vaulter

Personal information
- Nationality: Chinese
- Born: 10 May 1958 (age 68)

Sport
- Sport: Athletics
- Event: Pole vault

Yang Weimin (born 10 May 1958) is a Chinese athlete. He competed in the men's pole vault at the 1984 Summer Olympics.
