= Steve Chappell (pole vaulter) =

British pole vaulter)

Personal information
- Nationality: British (English)
- Born: 7 February 1952 Amersham, England

Sport
- Sport: Athletics
- Event: Pole vault
- Club: Thames Valley Harriers

Stephen A. Chappell (born 7 February 1952) is a former international athlete who competed at the Commonwealth Games.

== Biography ==
Chappell was born in 1972, in Amersham and lived at 34 The Drive in Amersham, he attended Dr Challoner's Grammar School.

Chappell was a member of the Thames Valley Harriers and specialised in the pole vault. He won the 1970 AAA junior title.

Chappell represented the England team at the 1970 British Commonwealth Games in Edinburgh, Scotland, where he competed in the pole vault event.
