= Brian Morrissette =

American pole vaulter

Personal information
- Full name: Brian John Morrissette
- Nationality: American Virgin Islander
- Born: October 10, 1956 (age 69)
- Height: 1.85 m (6 ft 1 in)
- Weight: 64 kg (141 lb)

Sport
- Sport: Athletics
- Event: Pole vault

Brian Morrissette (born October 10, 1956) is an athlete who represented the United States Virgin Islands. He competed in the men's pole vault at the 1984 Summer Olympics. He currently runs the "Estate Lindholm" resort on the Virgin Islands with his wife.

== International competitions ==
Year	Competition	Venue	Position	Notes
Representing United States Virgin Islands
1979	Pan American Games	San Juan, Puerto Rico	3rd	4.85 m
1982	Central American and Caribbean Games	Havana, Cuba	5th	4.80 m
1983	Central American and Caribbean Championships	Havana, Cuba	2nd	5.10 m
1983	Pan American Games	Caracas, Venezuela	–	NM
1984	Olympic Games	Los Angeles, United States	15th (q)	5.20 m
