= Kirk Bryde =

Canadian pole vaulter

Personal information
- Nationality: Canadian
- Born: 7 September 1949 (age 76) Vancouver, British Columbia, Canada

Sport
- Sport: Athletics
- Event: Pole vault

Kirk Bryde (born 7 September 1949) is a Canadian athlete. He competed in the men's pole vault at the 1972 Summer Olympics.

Bryde was an All-American pole vaulter for the Washington Huskies track and field team, finishing 5th at the 1972 NCAA University Division Outdoor Track and Field Championships.
