= Athletics at the 1978 Commonwealth Games – Men's pole vault =

Men's pole vault at the Commonwealth Games

The men's pole vault event at the 1978 Commonwealth Games was held on 11 August at the Commonwealth Stadium in Edmonton, Alberta, Canada.

== Results ==
Rank	Name	Nationality	Result	Notes
1st place, gold medalist(s)	Bruce Simpson	Canada	5.10	
2nd place, silver medalist(s)	Don Baird	Australia	5.10	
3rd place, bronze medalist(s)	Brian Hooper	England	5.00	
4	Jeff Gutteridge	England	5.00	
5	Harold Heer	Canada	4.80	
6	Glenn Colivas	Canada	4.80	
	Allan Williams	England	NM	
	Mike Bull	Northern Ireland	NM	
