= 1976 European Athletics Indoor Championships – Men's pole vault =

The men's pole vault event at the 1976 European Athletics Indoor Championships was held on 21 February in Munich.

== Results ==
Rank	Name	Nationality	Result	Notes
1st place, gold medalist(s)	Yuriy Prokhorenko	Soviet Union	5.45	CR
2nd place, silver medalist(s)	Antti Kalliomäki	Finland	5.40	
3rd place, bronze medalist(s)	Renato Dionisi	Italy	5.30	
4	Günther Lohre	West Germany	5.20	
5	Wolfgang Mohr (pole vaulter)	West Germany	5.20	
6	François Tracanelli	France	5.10	
7	Dimitrios Kiteas	Greece	5.10	
8	Wiesław Szkolnicki	Poland	5.00	
9	Kjell Isaksson	Sweden	5.00	
10	Romuald Murawski	Poland	5.00	
11	Mariusz Klimczyk	Poland	4.90	
