= Bruce Simpson (athlete) =

Canadian pole vaulter

Personal information
- Born: March 6, 1950 (age 76) Toronto, Ontario, Canada
- Height: 176 cm (5 ft 9 in)
- Weight: 72 kg (159 lb)

Sport
- Sport: Athletics
- Event: pole vault
- Club: Point Claire
Medal record
Representing Canada
Commonwealth Games
Gold medal – first place	1978 Edmonton	Pole vault
Pan American Games
Gold medal – first place	1979 San Juan	Pole vault
Silver medal – second place	1975 Mexico City	Pole vault
Bronze medal – third place	1971 Cali	Pole vault
Summer Universiade
Silver medal – second place	1975 Rome	Pole vault

Bruce Simpson (born March 6, 1950) is a retired male pole vaulter from Canada. He set his personal best (5.38 metres) in the men's pole vault on 13 February 1976 at a meet in Toronto.

Simpson finished third behind Kiyoshi Niwa in the pole vault event at the 1970 AAA Championships.

== International competitions ==
Year	Competition	Venue	Position	Notes
1970	British Commonwealth Games	Edinburgh, United Kingdom	5th	4.60 m
1971	Pan American Games	Cali, Colombia	3rd	4.90 m
1972	Olympic Games	Munich, West Germany	5th	5.20 m
1973	Pacific Conference Games	Toronto, Canada	2nd	5.10 m
1975	Universiade	Rome, Italy	2nd	5.20 m
1975	Pan American Games	Mexico City, Mexico	2nd	5.20 m
1976	Olympic Games	Montreal, Canada	–	NM
1977	World Cup	Düsseldorf, West Germany	7th	4.90 m^{1}
1977	Universiade	Sofia, Bulgaria	10th	5.00 m
1977	Pacific Conference Games	Canberra, Australia	1st	5.25 m
1978	Commonwealth Games	Edmonton, Canada	1st	5.10 m
1979	Pan American Games	San Juan, Puerto Rico	1st	5.15 m
1979	World Cup	Montreal, Canada	4th	5.20 m^{1}
1980	Liberty Bell Classic	Philadelphia, United States	4th	5.02 m
1982	Commonwealth Games	Brisbane, Australia	4th	5.10 m

^{1}Representing the Americas
