= Erico Barney =

Argentine pole vaulter

Personal information
- Full name: Eric Richard Barney
- Nickname: Erico
- Nationality: Argentine
- Born: 10 May 1941 (age 85) Misiones Province, Argentina
- Height: 1.84 m (6 ft 0 in)
- Weight: 75 kg (165 lb)

Sport
- Sport: Athletics
- Event: Pole vault

Eric Richard "Erico" Barney (born 10 May 1941) is a retired Argentine athlete. He competed in the men's pole vault at the 1968 Summer Olympics.

His personal best in the event is 4.87 metres set in Berkeley in 1971.

== International competitions ==
Year	Competition	Venue	Position	Notes
Representing Argentina
1965	South American Championships	Rio de Janeiro, Brazil	1st	4.25 m
1967	Pan American Games	Winnipeg, Canada	4th	4.45 m
1967	South American Championships	Buenos Aires, Argentina	1st	4.30 m
1968	Olympic Games	Mexico City, Mexico	17th (q)	4.80 m
1971	Pan American Games	Cali, Colombia	5th	4.70 m
1971	South American Championships	Lima, Peru	1st	4.50 m
