= Billy Olson =

American pole vaulter (born 1958)

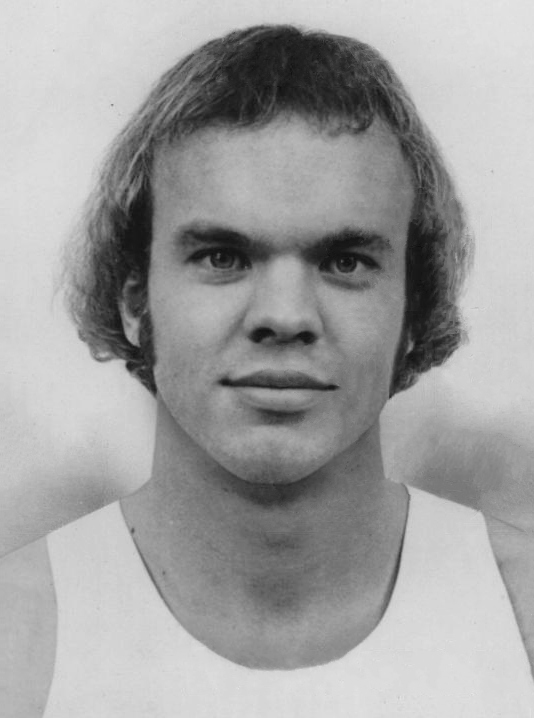
- Olson in 1984

Personal information
- Born: July 19, 1958 (age 67) Abilene, Texas, U.S.
- Height: 188 cm (6 ft 2 in)
- Weight: 73 kg (161 lb)

Sport
- Sport: Athletics
- Event: Pole vault
- Club: Mazda Optimist Track Club, Toronto

Achievements and titles
- Personal best: 5.93 m (1986)

Billy Richard Olson (born July 19, 1958) is a retired American Olympic pole vaulter who held several world records, including the first 19-foot indoor pole vault. Olson finished 12th at the 1988 Summer Olympics, and was to have been part of the U.S. team for the boycotted 1980 Summer Olympics.

Olson vaulted for Abilene High School and Abilene Christian University, from which he graduated. He was Inducted into the Texas Track and Field Coaches Hall of Fame, Class of 2012.
