= Itsuo Takanezawa =

Japanese pole vaulter

Personal information
- Nationality: Japanese
- Born: 5 August 1951 (age 74)

Sport
- Sport: Athletics
- Event: Pole vault
Medal record
Men's athletics
Representing Japan
Asian Championships
Gold medal – first place	1979 Tokyo	Pole vault

Itsuo Takanezawa (高根沢 威夫, Takanezawa Itsuo; born 5 August 1951) is a Japanese track and field athlete. He competed in the men's pole vault at the 1976 Summer Olympics.
