= Paul Wilson (pole vaulter) =

American pole vaulter

Personal information
- Nationality: American
- Born: July 30, 1947 (age 78)

Sport
- Sport: Athletics
- Event: pole vault

Paul Wilson (born July 30, 1947) is an American athlete specializing in the pole vault. He was the world record holder in the event. The first vaulter to clear his age in feet. In 1967 he was the number-one ranked pole vaulter in the world, but his career was cut short by injury.

== Athletic career ==
=== High school ===
Wilson was an outstanding high-school pole vaulter. As a student of Warren High School (Downey, California), he was coached by John Mitchell.

In 1964 as a junior, Wilson came to the attention of Sports Illustrated magazine. SI published his "whizzer of 15 feet" in their March 16 edition and awarded him an "Award of Merit" for setting the interscholastic age record. He broke the age record by becoming the first 16-year-old to clear 16 feet.

A year later, in 1965, as a senior, he won CIF Southern Section and CIF California State Meet titles and had achieved an age best in the pole vault of 16 ft 6.75 in (5.05 m). On 20 March 1965, he vaulted 16-6 3/4 at the Southern Counties meet as a Senior. At the CIF Southern Section Track Championships, held on 28 May 1965 at Cerritos College, Wilson won with a height of 16-0. He set records with his performances at the CIF Southern Section Championships (16-1 1/2) and California State Championships (15-6 1/2). His personal best height of 16-6 3/4 was the best mark on record for a California high school athlete (more than 5 inches higher than the next highest mark, at 16-1 by fellow Warren High School athlete Bob Steinhoff), set a national interscholastic track & field record, and stood as the best in the world.

Wilson won the British AAA Championships title in the pole vault event at the 1965 AAA Championships.

Wilson was twice named as Athlete of the Year in the CIF Southern Section by the Helms Athletic Foundation. In 1964 he was awarded for his pole vault of 16-0 1/8, in conjunction with hurdler Earl McCullough. In 1965 he was named again, this time for vaulting 16-6 3/4, with the co-award going to runner Richard Joyce; the two athletes were named together because both had won CIF and State meets and both had set new National Interscholastic records (Joyce's record in the 880 yard run still stands today because high schools metrified in 1980).

He was selected to the 1965 Honor Track & Field Team in the All-Southern Section of CIF by a panel of area sports writers.

=== College ===
After graduating high school, Wilson attended the University of Southern California (USC), where he competed for the USC Trojans athletics team. In his first year there, Wilson "hoisted the collegiate vault standard to 17-1."

1967 was Wilson's best year, as a 19-year-old college sophomore. He was United States champion and that winning vault broke the world record. He achieved this feat on 23 June 1967 in Bakersfield, California, with a height of 5.38 m (17 ft 8 in). It was the same day Jim Ryun set his long lasting world record in the mile. His record of 17-7 3/4 continues to be the sixth best height ever achieved by a USC Trojan.

Although he was the world record holder, injury prevented Wilson from competing at the United States trials for the 1968 Mexico City Olympics.

The injury prematurely ended his career.

== Records and rankings ==
During his curtailed career, Wilson was a formidable performer at USA national championships, held by the Amateur Athletic Union (AAU). Wilson was also voted by the experts at Track and Field News to be ranked among the best in the USA and the world at the pole vault during his career.

Pole Vault: Records held by Wilson
Year	CIF Southern	CA State	AAU	National	World
1965	MR	MR	NA	AR	WR
1966	NA	NA	CR		
1967	NA	NA	CR	AR	WR

MR = Meet record, CR = Collegiate record, AR = American record, WR = World record, NA = not applicable

Pole vault: Ranking held by Wilson
Year	World rank	US rank	USA Championships
1965	7th	5th	4th
1966	4th	3rd	2nd
1967	1st	1st	1st

Records
Preceded by (United States) Bob Seagren	Men's Pole Vault World Record Holder; June 23, 1967 – September 12, 1968	Succeeded by (United States) Bob Seagren
