= Renato Dionisi =

Italian pole vaulter (born 1947)

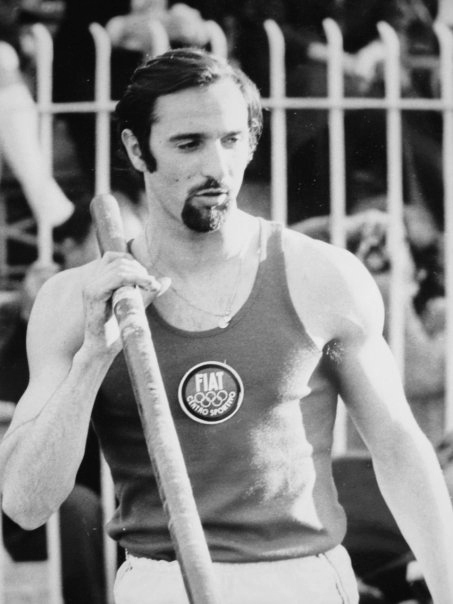
- Dionisi at the Arena Civica in Milan (1971)

Personal information
- Nationality: Italian
- Born: 21 November 1947 (age 78) Riva del Garda, Italy
- Height: 1.80 m (5 ft 11 in)
- Weight: 75 kg (165 lb)

Sport
- Country: Italy
- Sport: Athletics
- Event: Pole vault
- Club: Fiat Torino
- Retired: 1978

Achievements and titles
- Personal best: Pole vault: 5.42 m (1972)
Medal record
Men's athletics
Representing Italy
European Championships
Bronze medal – third place	1971 Helsinki	Pole vault
European Indoor Championships
Gold medal – first place	1973 Rotterdam	Pole vault
Bronze medal – third place	1976 Munich	Pole vault
Mediterranean Games
Silver medal – second place	1967 Tunis	Pole vault
Bronze medal – third place	1975 Algiers	Pole vault
Universiade
Bronze medal – third place	1975 Rome	Pole vault

Renato Dionisi (born 21 November 1947) is an Italian former pole vaulter. He was born in Riva del Garda. He set a career best of 5.45 m (17 ft 10 1/2 in) in Rovereto on 25 June 1972.

== Biography ==
He won five medals at the International athletics competitions. He represented his country twice at the Olympic Games (1964, 1972) and was a three-time participant at the European Athletics Championships (1966, 1969, 1971) and was a bronze medallist there on his last appearance. At the European Athletics Indoor Championships he was gold medallist in 1973 and bronze medallist three years later. He won minor medals at the Mediterranean Games on two occasions and was the 1975 Summer Universiade bronze medallist.

Dionisi has 47 caps for the Italy national athletics team (from 1964 to 1978). In his career he won the Italian Athletics Championships twelve times – ten times outdoors and twice indoors. He also won the British AAA Championships pole vault title at the 1968 AAA Championships.

== International competitions ==
Year	Competition	Venue	Position	Event	Notes
1964	Olympic Games	Tokyo, Japan	(q)	Pole vault	NM
1966	European Championships	Budapest, Hungary	4th	Pole vault	4.80 m
1967	Mediterranean Games	Tunis, Tunisia	2nd	Pole vault	4.90 m
1969	European Championships	Athens, Greece	—	Pole vault	NH
1970	European Cup	Stockholm, Sweden	2nd	Pole vault	5.20 m
1971	European Championships	Helsinki, Finland	3rd	Pole vault	5.35 m
1972	Olympic Games	Munich, West Germany	(q)	Pole vault	4.20 m
1973	European Indoor Championships	Rotterdam, Netherlands	1st	Pole vault	5.40 m
1975	Mediterranean Games	Algiers, Algeria	3rd	Pole vault	5.00 m
1975	Universiade	Rome, Italy	3rd	Pole vault	5.10 m
1976	European Indoor Championships	Munich, West Germany	3rd	Pole vault	5.30 m

== National titles ==
- 10 wins in pole vault at the Italian Athletics Championships (1964, 1965, 1966, 1967, 1968, 1969, 1970, 1971, 1977, 1978)
- 2 wins in pole vault at the Italian Athletics Indoor Championships (1971, 1973)
- 1 win in pole vault at the AAA Championships

== See also ==
- List of European Athletics Championships medalists (men)
- List of European Athletics Indoor Championships medalists (men)
- Italy national athletics team - Most caps
