= Greg Woepse =

American pole vaulter (born 1957)

Personal information
- Born: March 4, 1957 (age 69)
Medal record
Men's Athletics
Representing the United States
Pan American Games
Silver medal – second place	1979 San Juan	Pole Vault

Greg Woepse (born March 4, 1957) is a retired American track and field athlete, primarily in the pole vault. He is best known for achieving the silver medal at the 1979 Pan American Games.

Woepse appears on the American top 10 list three times, his highest rating was number 6 in 1979, which was also the year he graduated from San Jose State University. In his two attempts to make the Olympics he no heighted in 1980 and finished 8th before a near-home crowd in 1984 at the Olympic Trials.

Woepse was a pole vaulter at Mater Dei High School in Santa Ana, California. His name surfaces now at the school having coached the successful pole vaulting careers of his children Elizabeth, Greg, Jr., and Michael Woepse, who won the 2012 NACAC U23 Championships.
