= Vladimir Kishkun =

Russian former athlete (born 1951)

Personal information
- Born: 5 November 1951 (age 74) Leningrad, Soviet Union

Sport
- Sport: Track and field
Medal record
Representing Soviet Union
European Championships
| Gold medal – first place | 1974 Rome | Pole vault |

Vladimir Ivanovich Kishkun (Russian: Владимир Иванович Ҝишкүн; born 5 November 1951) is a Russian former athlete who competed in the 1976 Summer Olympics.
