= François Tracanelli =

French pole vaulter (born 1951)

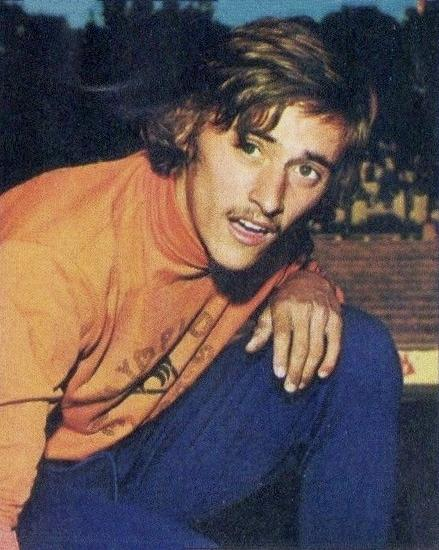

Personal information
- Born: 4 February 1951 (age 75) Udine, Italy
- Height: 187 cm (6 ft 2 in)
- Weight: 75 kg (165 lb)

Sport
- Sport: Athletics
- Event: Pole vault
- Club: Union Sportive Viry-Châtillon

Achievements and titles
- Personal best: 5.55 m (1981)
Medal record
Men's athletics
Representing France
European Indoor Championships
Gold medal – first place	1970 Vienna	Pole vault
Summer Universiade
Gold medal – first place	1973 Moscow	Pole vault
Gold medal – first place	1975 Rome	Pole vault
Bronze medal – third place	1970 Turin	Pole vault

François Tracanelli (born 4 February 1951) is a retired pole vaulter from France, who was born in Italy.

Tracanelli was an All-American pole vaulter for the UCLA Bruins track and field team, finishing runner-up at the 1971 NCAA University Division Outdoor Track and Field Championships.

== International competitions ==
Year	Competition	Venue	Position	Notes
1969	European Championships	Athens, Greece	–	NM
1970	European Indoor Championships	Vienna, Austria	1st	5.30 m
1970	Universiade	Turin, Italy	3rd	5.30 m
1970	European Junior Championships	Paris, France	1st	5.20 m
1971	European Championships	Helsinki, Finland	–	NM
1972	Olympic Games	Munich, West Germany	8th	5.10 m
1973	Universiade	Moscow, Soviet Union	1st	5.42 m
1974	European Championships	Rome, Italy	11th	5.00 m
1975	European Indoor Championships	Katowice, Poland	7th	5.30 m
1975	Universiade	Rome, Italy	1st	5.20 m
1976	European Indoor Championships	Munich, West Germany	6th	5.10 m
1976	Olympic Games	Montreal, Canada	–	NM
1978	European Indoor Championships	Milan, Italy	7th	5.20 m
1978	European Championships	Prague, Czechoslovakia	7th	5.30 m
