= Tadeusz Ślusarski =

Polish pole vaulter

Personal information
- Born: 19 May 1950 Żary, Poland
- Died: 17 August 1998 (aged 48) Ostromice, Poland

Sport
- Sport: Track and field
Medal record
Representing Poland
Olympic Games
Gold medal – first place	1976 Montreal	Pole vault
Silver medal – second place	1980 Moscow	Pole vault
European Indoor Championships
Gold medal – first place	1974 Gothenburg	Pole vault
Gold medal – first place	1978 Milan	Pole vault
Summer Universiade
Silver medal – second place	1977 Sofia	Pole vault

Tadeusz Ślusarski (19 May 1950 – 17 August 1998) was a Polish Olympic gold medalist in pole vault at the 1976 Summer Olympics, as well as a silver medalist at the 1980 Summer Olympics (behind another Polish champion Władysław Kozakiewicz).

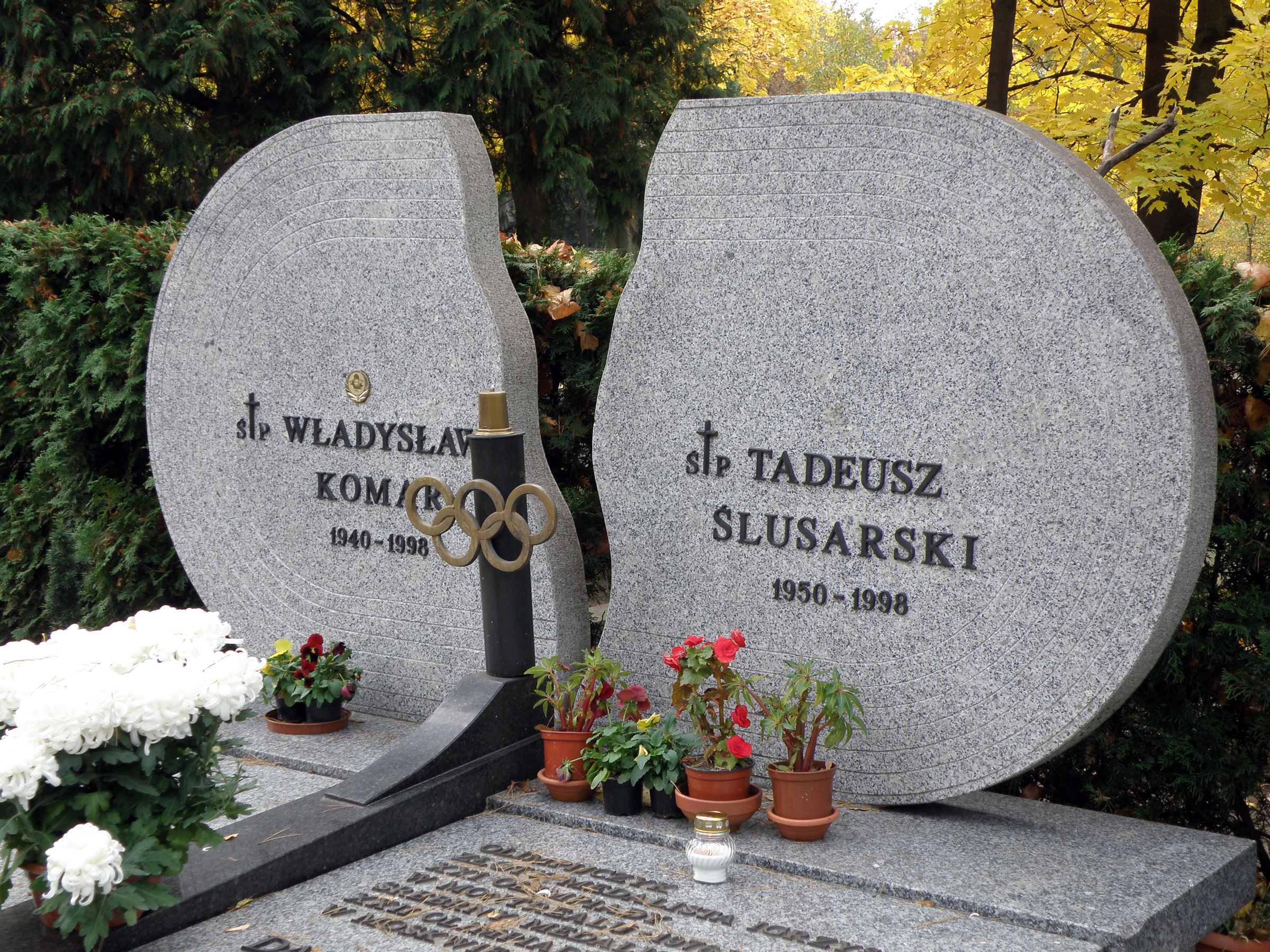
Tadeusz Ślusarski's grave at Powązki Military Cemetery in Warsaw

He died in a car crash together with the Polish shot put gold medalist from the 1972 Summer Olympics, Władysław Komar.

== Competition record ==
Year	Competition	Venue	Position	Notes
Representing Poland
1972	Olympic Games	Munich, Germany	11th (q)	5.00 m
1974	European Indoor Championships	Gothenburg, Sweden	1st	5.35 m
1974	European Championships	Rome, Italy	7th	5.20 m
1976	Olympic Games	Montreal, Canada	1st	5.50 m
1977	Universiade	Sofia, Bulgaria	2nd	5.50 m
1978	European Indoor Championships	Milan, Italy	1st	5.45 m
1980	Olympic Games	Moscow, Soviet Union	2nd	5.65 m
1982	European Championships	Athens, Greece	12th	5.35 m
1983	European Indoor Championships	Budapest, Hungary	5th	5.50 m
1983	World Championships	Helsinki, Finland	4th	5.55 m
