= Bob Seagren =

American pole vaulter (born 1946)

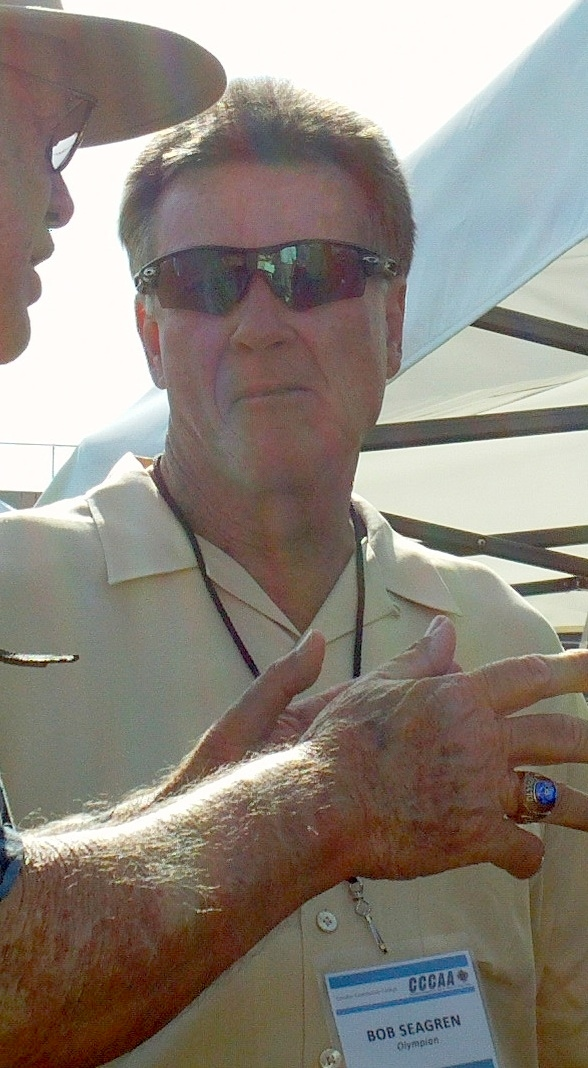

Personal information
- Born: October 17, 1946 (age 79) Pomona, California, United States
- Height: 1.83 m (6 ft 0 in)
- Weight: 80 kg (176 lb)

Sport
- Sport: Pole vaulting
- Club: Southern California Striders, Anaheim
Medal record
Representing the United States
Olympic Games
Gold medal – first place	1968 Mexico City	Pole vault
Silver medal – second place	1972 Munich	Pole vault
Pan American Games
Gold medal – first place	1967 Winnipeg	Pole vault
Summer Universiade
Silver medal – second place	1967 Tokyo	Pole vault

Robert Seagren (born October 17, 1946) is a retired American pole vaulter, the 1968 Olympic champion.

A native of Pomona, California, Seagren was one of the world's top pole vaulters in the late 1960s and early 1970s. He won six National AAU and four NCAA titles indoors and outdoors. Indoors he posted eight world bests between 1966 and 1969. He was also the Pan American Games champion in 1967. He set his first world record 5.32 metres (17 ft 5 in) in Fresno on May 14, 1966, followed by his world records 1967 in San Diego 5.36 metres (17 ft 7 in), 1968 in Echo Summit near South Lake Tahoe 5.41 metres (17 ft 9 in) and 1972 in Eugene 5.63 metres (18 ft 6 in).

In 1968, Seagren participated in his first Olympic Games in Mexico City. In an exciting contest, he won the gold medal with the top three vaulters, including silver medalist Claus Schiprowski (West Germany) and the bronze medal winner Wolfgang Nordwig (East Germany) reaching the same height 5.40 metres (17 ft 9 in).

Four years later, in Munich, he remains best remembered for the Olympic gold medal he didn't get. In the 1972 Summer Olympics, a last-minute ruling barred the new banana-Pole from Olympic competition, forcing some vaulters, including Seagren, to compete with unfamiliar poles. East German Wolfgang Nordwig didn't use a Cata-Pole and won the gold medal, with Seagren coming second. It was the first time an American had failed to win the Olympic gold medal in the pole vault. In fact, no American would again win a gold medal in the pole vault until Nick Hysong won in 2000.

A 1968 University of Southern California graduate, Seagren took a try at professional track and later he started his career in television and movies as a show host and soap opera actor. He was also taken in the 1967 ABA Draft by the New Orleans Buccaneers, despite never having played basketball at any level.

Seagren won the inaugural American Superstars sports competition in 1973 as well as the first World Superstars in 1977, his lone victories in both events. He was able to enjoy the spoils from these competitions because he had become a professional athlete having signed to join the International Track Association (ITA) tour after the 1972 Olympics. On the ITA tour, his rivalry with fellow American pole vaulter Steve Smith was renewed.

Seagren went on to become an actor, appearing in several movies and television shows, including the controversial sitcom Soap in 1977 in which he played Dennis Phillips, a gay football player in a relationship with Billy Crystal's character Jodie Dallas. He appeared as a guest star in an episode of Charlie's Angels in 1980, called "Toni's Boys" as a detective who worked for a friend of Charlie who was also in the detective business. The episode was a backdoor pilot for a new series but the show wasn't picked up by the network. He was referred to in the episode as an "Olympic Champion" although he played a fictional character. He also guest starred on the TV series Wonder Woman in the episodes called "Stolen Faces" and "The Man Who Could Not Die". Seagren played himself, serving as an LAPD youth camp counselor on the "Camp Two" episode of Adam-12.

Today, he is CEO of International City Racing, which specializes in the development, management, and implementation of road racing, endurance, and fitness events, including the Long Beach International City Marathon. He is also an active supporter of the Commission on Athletics of the California Community Colleges.

He was named to the inaugural class of the Mt. SAC Relays Hall of Fame. In 1986 he was inducted into the USATF National Track and Field Hall of Fame.

He was married to actress and Playboy Playmate of the month (January 1990) Peggy McIntaggart, and they had twins (a boy and a girl), McKenzie and Mika Seagren, born in 1997.

Records
Preceded by (United States) Fred Hansen	Men's Pole Vault World Record Holder; May 14, 1966 – July 23, 1966	Succeeded by (United States) John Pennel
Preceded by (United States) John Pennel	Men's Pole Vault World Record Holder; June 10, 1967 – June 23, 1967	Succeeded by (United States) Paul Wilson
Preceded by (United States) Paul Wilson	Men's Pole Vault World Record Holder; September 12, 1968 – June 21, 1969	Succeeded by (United States) John Pennel
Preceded by (Sweden) Kjell Isaksson	Men's Pole Vault World Record Holder; July 2, 1972 – March 28, 1975	Succeeded by (United States) David Roberts
Sporting positions
Preceded by (Sweden) Kjell Isaksson	Men's Pole Vault Best Year Performance; 1972	Succeeded by (United States) Steve Smith
