= Yuriy Prokhorenko =

Ukrainian pole vaulter

Medal record

Men's athletics

Representing Soviet Union

European Indoor Championships
Gold medal – first place	1976 Munich	Pole vault

Yuriy Prokhorenko (born 9 March 1951) is a Ukrainian former pole vaulter who competed in the 1976 Summer Olympics and in the 1980 Summer Olympics.
