= Ingemar Jernberg =

Swedish pole vaulter

Personal information
- Nationality: Swedish
- Born: 28 November 1950 (age 75) Gothenburg, Sweden
- Height: 178 cm (5 ft 10 in)
- Weight: 75 kg (165 lb)

Sport
- Sport: Athletics
- Event: Pole vault
- Club: IF Göta, Karlstad

Kurt Ingemar Jernberg (born 28 November 1950) is a Swedish athlete. He competed in the men's pole vault at the 1972 Summer Olympics and the 1976 Summer Olympics.

Jernbern was an All-American vaulter for the New Mexico Lobos track and field team, finishing 4th in the pole vault at the 1973 NCAA Indoor Track and Field Championships.

Jernberg finished third behind Brian Hooper in the pole vault event at the 1973 AAA Championships.
