= Hannes Botha =

South African rugby union player (1937–2011)

- Full name: Johannes Petrus Fredrick Botha
- Born: 11 May 1937 Potgietersrus, South Africa
- Died: 30 August 2011 (aged 74) Western Cape, South Africa
- Height: 1.89 m (6 ft 2 in)
- Weight: 98.9 kg (218 lb)

Rugby union career
- Position: Flanker
Provincial / State sides
Years	Team	Apps	(Points)
- Northern Transvaal
- Orange Free State
International career
Years	Team	Apps	(Points)
1962	South Africa	3	(0)

Johannes Petrus Fredrick Botha (11 May 1937 – 30 August 2011), known as Hannes Botha, was a South African Army brigadier and international rugby union player.

Botha was born in Potgietersrus and attended Hoërskool Wonderboom in Pretoria, where his future Springboks captain Avril Malan was a schoolmate. After finishing high school, Botha pursued a career in the army and played his early rugby for the Saldanha military academy team. He represented Boland during this period as a lock forward.

On his return to Pretoria in 1960, Botha earned Junior Springboks representative honours, followed by a place on the Springboks squad for the 1960–61 tour of Europe, to back up flankers Martin Pelser and Hugo van Zyl. His participation on the tour was limited to seven uncapped fixtures and he wasn't helped by a hamstring injury which had him sidelined for an extended period. An opportunity however arose the following year when Pelser defected to rugby league and Botha was capped three times as a flanker against the touring British Lions, finishing on the winning team each time.

== See also ==
- List of South Africa national rugby union players
