= Allan Kane (pole vaulter) =

Canadian pole vaulter (born 1948)

Personal information
- Born: March 19, 1948 (age 78)

Sport
- Sport: Athletics
- Event: Pole vault
Medal record
Representing Canada
British Commonwealth Games
Silver medal – second place	1970 Edinburgh	Pole vault

Allan Kane (born March 19, 1948) is a Canadian former athlete who competed in pole vault.

A native of Burnaby, British Columbia, Kane was a silver medalist in pole vault at the 1970 British Commonwealth Games in Edinburgh and won Canada's national championship in 1973. He represented Canada in two editions of the Pan American Games, placing sixth at the 1971 Pan American Games and fifth at the 1975 Pan American Games.

Kane was a track and field competitor for Simon Fraser University.
