= Volker Ohl =

German former pole vaulter (born 1950)

Volker Ohl (born 27 April 1950) is a German former pole vaulter who competed in the 1972 Summer Olympics.
