= Reinhard Kuretzky =

German pole vaulter

Personal information
- Born: 1 December 1947 (age 78) Delmenhorst, West Germany

Sport
- Sport: Track and field

Reinhard Kuretzky (born 1 December 1947) is a German former pole vaulter who competed in the 1972 Summer Olympics.
