= Yury Isakov =

Soviet pole vaulter

Personal information
- Nationality: Soviet
- Born: 30 December 1949 Yekaterinburg, Soviet Union
- Died: 29 September 2013 (aged 63) Yekaterinburg, Russia

Sport
- Sport: Athletics
- Event: Pole vault
Medal record
Men's athletics
Representing Soviet Union
European Championships
Bronze medal – third place	1974 Rome	Pole vault
European Indoor Championships
Bronze medal – third place	1971 Sofia	Pole vault
Summer Universiade
Silver medal – second place	1973 Moscow	Pole vault

Yury Borisovich Isakov (30 December 1949 – 29 September 2013) was a Soviet athlete. He competed in the men's pole vault at the 1976 Summer Olympics.
