= Silvio Fraquelli =

Italian pole vaulter

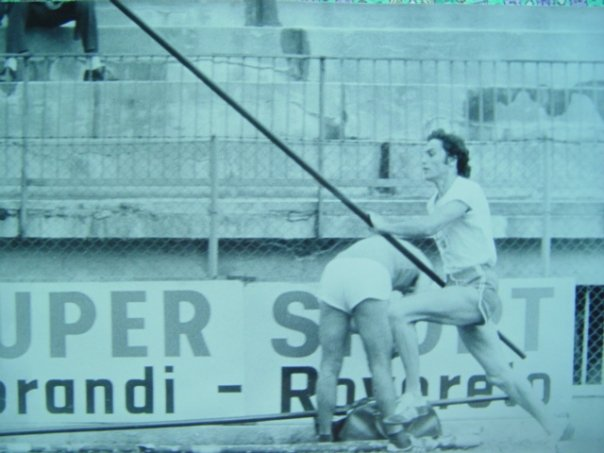
- Silvio Fraquelli (Florence, 1971)

Personal information
- Nationality: Italian
- Born: 25 June 1952 (age 74) Asti, Italy
- Height: 1.78 m (5 ft 10 in)
- Weight: 77 kg (170 lb)

Sport
- Country: Italy
- Sport: Athletics
- Event: Pole vault
- Club: CUS Torino

Achievements and titles
- Personal best: Pole vault: 5.30 m (1975)
Medal record
Mediterranean Games
Gold medal – first place	1975 Algiers	Pole vault

Silvio Fraquelli (born 25 June 1952) is an Italian former pole vaulter.

He won one medal at the International athletics competitions.

== Biography ==
He competed in the 1972 Summer Olympics, he has 22 caps in national team from 1971 to 1976.

His twin brother, Osvaldo, was also an athlete.

== Olympic results ==
Year	Competition	Venue	Position	Event	Measure	Notes
1972	Olympic Games	(West Germany) Munich	Qual.	Pole vault	4.80 m	

== National championships ==
He has won 6 times the individual national championship.

- 5 wins in the pole vault (1972, 1973, 1974, 1975, 1976)
- 1 win in the pole vault indoor (1972)
