= Earl Bell =

American pole vaulter (born 1955)

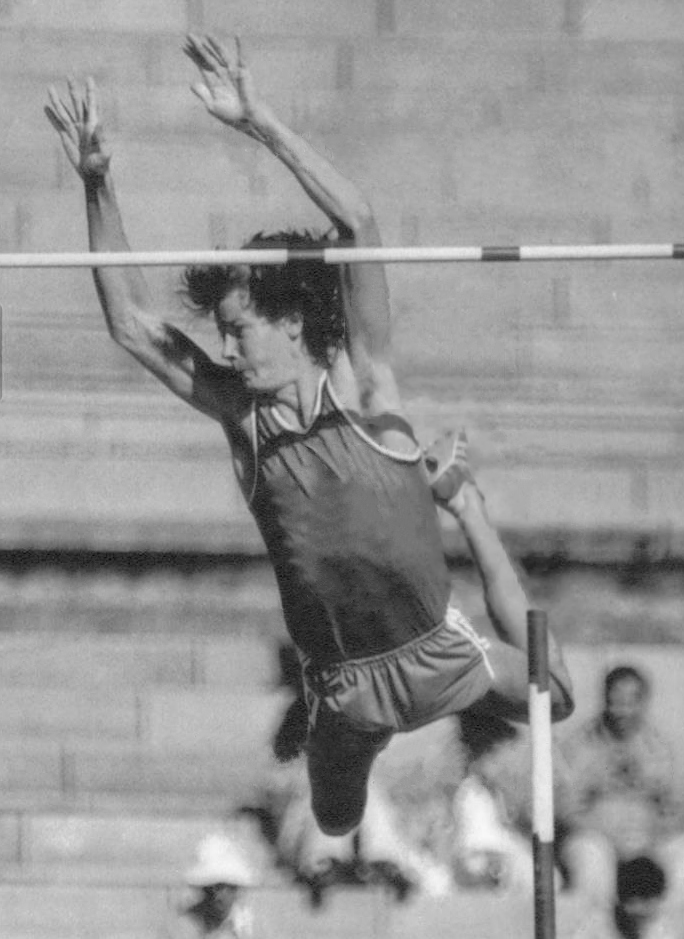
- Bell in 1976

Personal information
- Born: August 25, 1955 (age 71) Ancón, Panama
- Height: 191 cm (6 ft 3 in)
- Weight: 77 kg (170 lb)

Sport
- Sport: Athletics
- Event: Pole vault
- Club: Arkansas State Indians; Pacific Coast Club, Long Beach
- Coached by: Guy Kochel

Achievements and titles
- Personal best: 5.87 m (1988)
Medal record
Representing United States
Olympic Games
Bronze medal – third place	1984 Los Angeles	Pole vault
IAAF World Indoor Championships
Silver medal – second place	1987 Indianapolis	Pole vault
Pan American Games
Gold medal – first place	1975 Mexico City	Pole vault

Earl Holmes Bell (born August 25, 1955) is a retired American pole vaulter. He competed at the 1976, 1984, and 1988 Summer Olympics, winning a bronze medal in 1984. He finished sixth in 1976 and fourth in 1988.

Bell briefly held the world record in the pole vault in 1976. He later became a coach and trained several prominent American pole vaulters. In 2002, he was inducted into the National Track and Field Hall of Fame.

== Early life and education ==
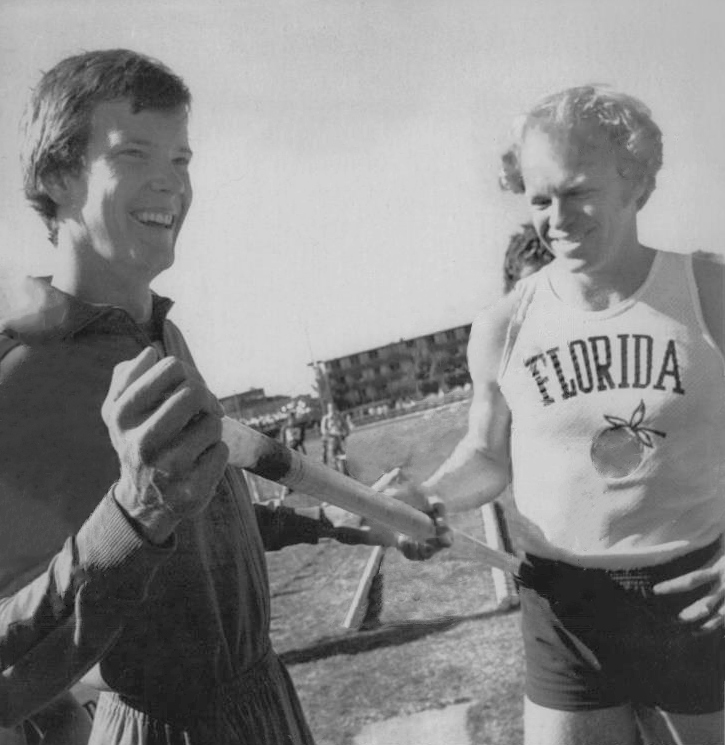
Roberts (right) returns a borrowed pole to Bell at the 1976 Olympic Trials

Bell was born in Panama to William "Papa" K. Bell and Yola Zimmerman Bell. His father was a medical doctor, a masters record-holder in pole vaulting, and attended the University of Arkansas. The family moved from Panama to Jonesboro, Arkansas, in 1960.

In 1973, Bell entered Arkansas State University. He graduated in 1988 with a BSc degree in accounting. While attending Arkansas State, Bell won the NCAA pole vault title in 1975, 1976, and 1977. He also won the AAU championships in 1976 and 1984 and placed third in 1981. Bell won a gold medal at the 1975 Pan American Games and finished fifth at the 1991 Pan American Games.

Bell entered the 1976 U.S. Olympic Trials as the world record holder. During the trials, he lent his pole to David Roberts, who broke it. Roberts won the trials with a new world record, while Bell finished second. At the 1976 Summer Olympics, Roberts won the bronze medal and Bell finished sixth.

Bell won the British AAA Championships title at the 1981 AAA Championships.

== Coaching career ==
After retiring from competition, Bell established Bell Athletics outside Jonesboro, Arkansas, where he coached Jeff Hartwig, Derek Miles, Kellie Suttle, Daniel Ryland, and Jillian Schwartz, among other pole vaulters.

Bell is married and has three children: Drew, Sam, and Henry.

== Rankings ==
Bell remained highly ranked throughout his career, receiving U.S. rankings among the world's leading pole vaulters for 16 consecutive years in the annual rankings published by Track and Field News.

Year	Event	World ranking	U.S. ranking
1975	Pole vault	3rd	1st
1976	Pole vault	4th	2nd
1977	Pole vault	4th	2nd
1978	Pole vault	–	5th
1979	Pole vault	–	5th
1980	Pole vault	–	6th
1981	Pole vault	6th	1st
1982	Pole vault	–	4th
1983	Pole vault	–	3rd
1984	Pole vault	7th	2nd
1985	Pole vault	–	4th
1986	Pole vault	5th	1st
1987	Pole vault	3rd	1st
1988	Pole vault	5th	2nd
1989	Pole vault	–	5th
1990	Pole vault	–	3rd

Records
Preceded by (United States) David Roberts	Men's pole vault world record holder May 28, 1976 – June 22, 1976	Succeeded by (United States) David Roberts
