= Pole vault at the Olympics =

Pole vault at the Olympic Games
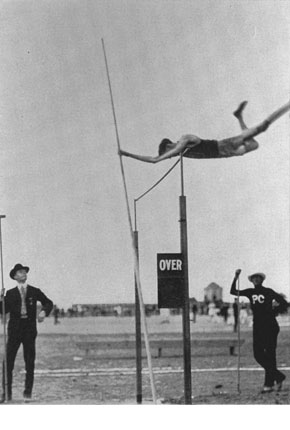
- The 1904 pole vault competition

Overview
- Sport: Athletics
- Gender: Men and women
- Years held: Men: 1896–2024; Women: 2000–2024

Olympic record
- Men: 6.25 m Armand Duplantis (2024)
- Women: 5.05 m Yelena Isinbayeva (2008)

Reigning champion
- Men: Armand Duplantis (SWE)
- Women: Nina Kennedy (AUS)

The pole vault at the Summer Olympics is grouped among the four track and field jumping events held at the multi-sport event. The men's pole vault has been present on the Olympic athletics programme since the first Summer Olympics in 1896. The women's event is one of the latest additions to the programme, first being contested at the 2000 Summer Olympics – along with the addition of the hammer throw, this brought the women's field event programme to parity with the men's.

The Olympic records for the event are 6.25 m (20 ft 6 in) for men, set by Armand Duplantis in 2024, and 5.05 m (16 ft 6 3/4 in) for women, set by Yelena Isinbayeva in 2008. Isinbayeva's 2008 mark was a world record at the time and her 2004 victory in 4.91 m (16 ft 1 1/4 in) had been the first women's world record in the pole vault to be set at the Olympics. In spite of its longer history, the men's Olympic event has only seen three world record marks – a clearance of 4.09 m (13 ft 5 in) by Frank Foss at the 1920 Antwerp Olympics, Władysław Kozakiewicz's vault of 5.78 m (18 ft 11 1/2 in) to win at the 1980 Moscow Olympics and Armand Duplantis' 2024 winning clearance of 6.25 m (20 ft 6 in).

William Hoyt was the first Olympic champion in 1896 and Stacy Dragila became the first female Olympic pole vault champion over 100 years later in 2000. Armand Duplantis and Katie Nageotte are the reigning Olympic champions from 2021. Yelena Isinbayeva, Bob Richards and Armand Duplantis are the only athletes to win two Olympic pole vault titles. Isinbayeva and Richards are also the only two athletes to win more than two Olympic medals in the discipline. The United States is the most successful nation in the event.

== Medalists ==
=== Men ===
| Games | Gold | Silver | Bronze |
|---|---|---|---|
| 1896 Athens | William Hoyt; United States | Albert Tyler; United States | Evangelos Damaskos; Greece |
| 1896 Athens | William Hoyt; United States | Albert Tyler; United States | Ioannis Theodoropoulos; Greece |
| 1900 Paris | Irving Baxter; United States | Meredith Colket; United States | Carl Albert Andersen; Norway |
| 1904 St. Louis | Charles Dvorak; United States | LeRoy Samse; United States | Louis Wilkins; United States |
| 1908 London | Edward Cook; United States | none awarded | Edward Archibald; Canada |
| 1908 London | Edward Cook; United States | none awarded | Clare Jacobs; United States |
| 1908 London | Alfred Gilbert; United States | none awarded | Clare Jacobs; United States |
| 1908 London | Alfred Gilbert; United States | none awarded | Bruno Söderström; Sweden |
| 1912 Stockholm | Harry Babcock; United States | Frank Nelson; United States | William Halpenny; Canada |
| 1912 Stockholm | Harry Babcock; United States | Frank Nelson; United States | Frank Murphy; United States |
| 1912 Stockholm | Harry Babcock; United States | Marc Wright; United States | Frank Murphy; United States |
| 1912 Stockholm | Harry Babcock; United States | Marc Wright; United States | Bertil Uggla; Sweden |
| 1920 Antwerp | Frank Foss; United States | Henry Petersen; Denmark | Edwin Myers; United States |
| 1924 Paris | Lee Barnes; United States | Glenn Graham; United States | James Brooker; United States |
| 1928 Amsterdam | Sabin Carr; United States | William Droegemueller; United States | Charles McGinnis; United States |
| 1932 Los Angeles | Bill Miller; United States | Shuhei Nishida; Japan | George Jefferson; United States |
| 1936 Berlin | Earle Meadows; United States | Shuhei Nishida; Japan | Sueo Ōe; Japan |
| 1948 London | Guinn Smith; United States | Erkki Kataja; Finland | Bob Richards; United States |
| 1952 Helsinki | Bob Richards; United States | Don Laz; United States | Ragnar Lundberg; Sweden |
| 1956 Melbourne | Bob Richards; United States | Bob Gutowski; United States | Georgios Roubanis; Greece |
| 1960 Rome | Don Bragg; United States | Ron Morris; United States | Eeles Landström; Finland |
| 1964 Tokyo | Fred Hansen; United States | Wolfgang Reinhardt; United Team of Germany | Klaus Lehnertz; United Team of Germany |
| 1968 Mexico City | Bob Seagren; United States | Claus Schiprowski; West Germany | Wolfgang Nordwig; East Germany |
| 1972 Munich | Wolfgang Nordwig; East Germany | Bob Seagren; United States | Jan Johnson; United States |
| 1976 Montreal | Tadeusz Ślusarski; Poland | Antti Kalliomäki; Finland | David Roberts; United States |
| 1980 Moscow | Władysław Kozakiewicz; Poland | Tadeusz Ślusarski; Poland | none awarded |
| 1980 Moscow | Władysław Kozakiewicz; Poland | Konstantin Volkov; Soviet Union | none awarded |
| 1984 Los Angeles | Pierre Quinon; France | Mike Tully; United States | Earl Bell; United States |
| 1984 Los Angeles | Pierre Quinon; France | Mike Tully; United States | Thierry Vigneron; France |
| 1988 Seoul | Sergey Bubka; Soviet Union | Radion Gataullin; Soviet Union | Grigoriy Yegorov; Soviet Union |
| 1992 Barcelona | Maksim Tarasov; Unified Team | Igor Trandenkov; Unified Team | Javier García; Spain |
| 1996 Atlanta | Jean Galfione; France | Igor Trandenkov; Russia | Andrei Tivontchik; Germany |
| 2000 Sydney | Nick Hysong; United States | Lawrence Johnson; United States | Maksim Tarasov; Russia |
| 2004 Athens | Timothy Mack; United States | Toby Stevenson; United States | Giuseppe Gibilisco; Italy |
| 2008 Beijing | Steve Hooker; Australia | Yevgeny Lukyanenko; Russia | Derek Miles; United States |
| 2012 London | Renaud Lavillenie; France | Björn Otto; Germany | Raphael Holzdeppe; Germany |
| 2016 Rio de Janeiro | Thiago Braz; Brazil | Renaud Lavillenie; France | Sam Kendricks; United States |
| 2020 Tokyo | Armand Duplantis; Sweden | Chris Nilsen; United States | Thiago Braz; Brazil |
| 2024 Paris | Armand Duplantis; Sweden | Sam Kendricks; United States | Emmanouil Karalis; Greece |
| 2028 Los Angeles | | | |

==== Multiple medalists ====
| Rank | Athlete | Nation | Olympics | Gold | Silver | Bronze | Total |
|---|---|---|---|---|---|---|---|
| 1 | Bob Richards | United States | 1948–1956 | 2 | 0 | 1 | 3 |
| 2 | Armand Duplantis | Sweden | 2020-2024 | 2 | 0 | 0 | 2 |
| 3 | Bob Seagren | United States | 1968–1972 | 1 | 1 | 0 | 2 |
| 3 | Tadeusz Ślusarski | Poland | 1976–1980 | 1 | 1 | 0 | 2 |
| 3 | Renaud Lavillenie | France | 2012–2016 | 1 | 1 | 0 | 2 |
| 6 | Wolfgang Nordwig | East Germany | 1968–1972 | 1 | 0 | 1 | 2 |
| 6 | Maksim Tarasov | Russia; Unified Team | 1992–2000 | 1 | 0 | 1 | 2 |
| 6 | Thiago Braz | Brazil | 2016–2020 | 1 | 0 | 1 | 2 |
| 9 | Shuhei Nishida | Japan | 1932–1936 | 0 | 2 | 0 | 2 |
| 9 | Igor Trandenkov | Russia; Unified Team | 1992–1996 | 0 | 2 | 0 | 2 |

==== Medalists by country ====
| Rank | Nation | Gold | Silver | Bronze | Total |
|---|---|---|---|---|---|
| 1 | United States (USA) | 19 | 16 | 13 | 48 |
| 2 | France (FRA) | 3 | 1 | 1 | 5 |
| 3 | Poland (POL) | 2 | 1 | 0 | 3 |
| 4 | Sweden (SWE) | 2 | 0 | 3 | 5 |
| 5 | Soviet Union (URS) | 1 | 2 | 1 | 4 |
| 6 | Unified Team | 1 | 1 | 0 | 2 |
| 7 | Brazil (BRA) | 1 | 0 | 1 | 2 |
| 7 | East Germany (GDR) | 1 | 0 | 1 | 2 |
| 9 | Australia (AUS) | 1 | 0 | 0 | 1 |
| 10 | Germany (GER) | 0 | 2 | 3 | 5 |
| 11 | Finland (FIN) | 0 | 2 | 1 | 3 |
| 11 | Japan (JPN) | 0 | 2 | 1 | 3 |
| 11 | Russia (RUS) | 0 | 2 | 1 | 3 |
| 14 | Denmark (DEN) | 0 | 1 | 0 | 1 |
| 14 | West Germany (FRG) | 0 | 1 | 0 | 1 |
| 16 | Greece (GRE) | 0 | 0 | 4 | 4 |
| 17 | Canada (CAN) | 0 | 0 | 2 | 2 |
| 18 | Italy (ITA) | 0 | 0 | 1 | 1 |
| 18 | Norway (NOR) | 0 | 0 | 1 | 1 |
| 18 | Spain (ESP) | 0 | 0 | 1 | 1 |
| Totals (20 entries) | | 31 | 31 | 35 | 97 |

- ^{nb} The German total includes teams both competing as Germany and the United Team of Germany, but not East or West Germany.
- A YouTube video showcasing all medal-winning countries can be found here.

=== Women ===
| Games | Gold | Silver | Bronze |
|---|---|---|---|
| 2000 Sydney | Stacy Dragila; United States | Tatiana Grigorieva; Australia | Vala Flosadóttir; Iceland |
| 2004 Athens | Yelena Isinbayeva; Russia | Svetlana Feofanova; Russia | Anna Rogowska; Poland |
| 2008 Beijing | Yelena Isinbayeva; Russia | Jennifer Stuczynski; United States | Svetlana Feofanova; Russia |
| 2012 London | Jennifer Suhr; United States | Yarisley Silva; Cuba | Yelena Isinbayeva; Russia |
| 2016 Rio de Janeiro | Katerina Stefanidi; Greece | Sandi Morris; United States | Eliza McCartney; New Zealand |
| 2020 Tokyo | Katie Nageotte; United States | Anzhelika Sidorova; ROC | Holly Bradshaw; Great Britain |
| 2024 Paris | Nina Kennedy; Australia | Katie Moon; United States | Alysha Newman; Canada |
| 2028 Los Angeles | | | |

==== Multiple medalists ====
| Rank | Athlete | Nation | Olympics | Gold | Silver | Bronze | Total |
|---|---|---|---|---|---|---|---|
| 1 | Yelena Isinbayeva | Russia | 2004–2012 | 2 | 0 | 1 | 3 |
| 2 | Jennifer Suhr | United States | 2008–2012 | 1 | 1 | 0 | 2 |
| 2 | Katie Moon | United States | 2020–2024 | 1 | 1 | 0 | 2 |
| 3 | Svetlana Feofanova | Russia | 2004–2008 | 0 | 1 | 1 | 2 |

==== Medalists by country ====
| Rank | Nation | Gold | Silver | Bronze | Total |
|---|---|---|---|---|---|
| 1 | United States | 3 | 3 | 0 | 6 |
| 2 | Russia | 2 | 1 | 2 | 5 |
| 3 | Australia | 1 | 1 | 0 | 2 |
| 4 | Greece | 1 | 0 | 0 | 1 |
| 5 | Cuba | 0 | 1 | 0 | 1 |
| 5 | ROC | 0 | 1 | 0 | 1 |
| 7 | Canada | 0 | 0 | 1 | 1 |
| 7 | Great Britain | 0 | 0 | 1 | 1 |
| 7 | Iceland | 0 | 0 | 1 | 1 |
| 7 | New Zealand | 0 | 0 | 1 | 1 |
| 7 | Poland | 0 | 0 | 1 | 1 |

== Intercalated Games ==
The 1906 Intercalated Games were held in Athens and at the time were officially recognised as part of the Olympic Games series, with the intention being to hold a games in Greece in two-year intervals between the internationally held Olympics. However, this plan never came to fruition and the International Olympic Committee (IOC) later decided not to recognise these games as part of the official Olympic series. Some sports historians continue to treat the results of these games as part of the Olympic canon.

Continuing its presence since the first Olympics, a men's pole vault event was contested at the 1906 Games. France's Fernand Gonder entered as the world record holder and delivered by winning in an Olympic record-equalling mark. The runner-up, Bruno Söderström of Sweden, also won a javelin throw medal that year. Ed Glover, the American champion, was the bronze medallist.

| Games | Gold | Silver | Bronze |
|---|---|---|---|
| 1906 Athens | Fernand Gonder (FRA) | Bruno Söderström (SWE) | Ed Glover (USA) |

== Non-canonical Olympic events ==
In addition to the main 1900 Olympic men's pole vault, a handicap competition was held four days later. The joint fourth-place finishers in the main event took the top two spots, with Jakab Kauser posting a mark of 3.45 m with a handicap of 45 cm, and Eric Lemming coming second with his result of 3.40 m with a 30 cm handicap. Meredith Colket, the silver medallist in the main event registered 3.20 m with a handicap of 15 cm. Two further non-handicap "scratch" competitions were held that are no longer considered canon Olympic events: the American champion Bascom Johnson won an event on 16 July, then three days later Daniel Horton (a triple jump competitor) defeated Charles Dvorak in a consolation event – both had missed the final proper as it was held on the Sabbath. Dvorak went on to win the Olympic pole vault gold in 1904.

The handicap event returned at the 1904 Summer Olympics. LeRoy Samse, the runner-up in the main Olympic pole vault, won with 3.58 m and a handicap of one inch. Walter Dray, sixth in the Olympic event, came second with 3.58 m and a ten-inch handicap, while Olympic fifth placer Claude Allen recorded 3.55 m off a seven-inch handicap.

These events are no longer considered part of the official Olympic history of the pole vault or the athletics programme in general. Consequently, medals from these competitions have not been assigned to nations on the all-time medal tables.
