= Stanley Wagoner =

American pole vaulter (1891–1949)

Stanley Blewett Wagoner (September 9, 1891 – April 16, 1949) was an American pole vaulter. The third man in the world to jump 13 feet (3.96 m), Wagoner won the United States championship in 1913.

== Pole vault career ==
Wagoner won the national junior championship in 1911 with a new age-group record of 12 ft 5.64 in (3.80 m), making him also a leading contender for the senior championship, which was contested the following day. At 12 ft 3 in (3.73 m) he made what was likely the highest vault in the competition, clearing the bar by a large margin; at 12 ft 6 in (3.81 m), however, he failed on all three attempts and ended up sharing fourth place with future Olympic champion Harry Babcock.

Wagoner broke the intercollegiate pole vault record in May 1912, nearly also breaking the world record. Having made 12 ft 8 in (3.86 m) to secure victory over his Yale teammate Bobby Gardner, Wagoner raised the bar to 13 ft (3.96 m), a height that no one in the world had cleared in a competition. He went over the bar faultlessly, but as the original measurement had been taken at the ends of the bar the height was remeasured at the middle, and the bar was found to sag so much the actual height was only 12 ft 9 1/2 in (3.89 m) - still good for an intercollegiate record, but short of the world record. Gardner would become the first official 13 foot jumper the following month.

Wagoner succeeded Gardner as captain of the Yale track team in 1913. He won the national pole vault championship that year, this time legitimately clearing 13 ft (3.96 m) for a new meeting record. He was only the third man to jump 13 feet, after Gardner and Marc Wright; he attempted to cap his victory by breaking Wright's world record, but failed.
