= Athletics at the 1912 Summer Olympics – Men's pole vault =

Men's pole vault at the Games of the V Olympiad
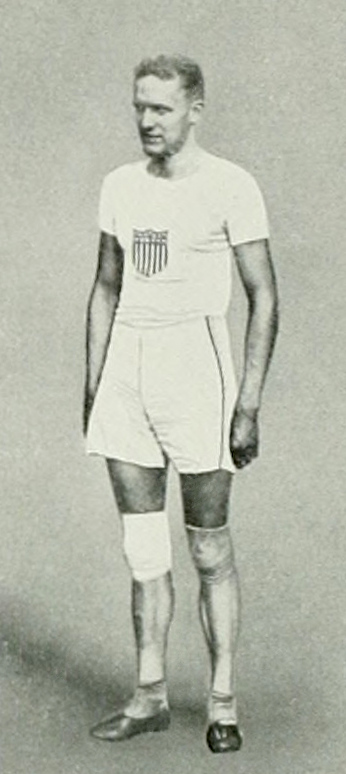
- Gold medalist Harry Babcock
- Venue: Stockholm Olympic Stadium
- Dates: July 10–11, 1912
- Competitors: 25 from 11 nations

Medalists
1st place, gold medalist(s)		Harry Babcock; United States
2nd place, silver medalist(s)		Frank Nelson; United States
2nd place, silver medalist(s)		Marc Wright; United States
3rd place, bronze medalist(s)		William Halpenny; Canada
3rd place, bronze medalist(s)		Frank Murphy; United States
3rd place, bronze medalist(s)		Bertil Uggla; Sweden

The men's pole vault was a track and field athletics event held as part of the Athletics at the 1912 Summer Olympics programme. It was the fifth appearance of the event, which is one of 12 to have been held at every Summer Olympics. The competition was held on Wednesday, July 10, 1912, and on Thursday, July 11, 1912. Twenty-five pole vaulters from eleven nations competed. NOCs could enter up to 12 athletes. It was the second straight Games in which more than 3 medals were awarded in the event. The event was won by Harry Babcock of the United States, the nation's fifth consecutive victory in the event. Fellow Americans Frank Nelson and Marc Wright tied for second and were both awarded silver; normally, this would have constituted a medal sweep. However, bronze medals were awarded to the three men tied for fourth place. This put both Canada and Sweden on the podium for the second consecutive Games and awarded the United States a total of four medals in the 1912 pole vault.

== Background ==
This was the fifth appearance of the event, which is one of 12 athletics events to have been held at every Summer Olympics. The returning vaulters from the 1908 Games were sixth-place finishers Georgios Banikas of Greece and Sam Bellah of the United States. The American team was dominant but there "was no clear American favorite" with many accomplished pole vaulters from the United States. The home team of Sweden was large as well, headlined by Bertil Uggla. Canada's William Halpenny was also a contender, having won the 1908 AAU championship.

Austria, Bohemia, Denmark, Italy, and Russia each made their first appearance in the event. The United States made its fifth appearance, the only nation to have competed at every Olympic men's pole vault to that point.

== Competition format ==
The 1912 tournament introduced a true two-round format, with results cleared between rounds. Vaulters received three attempts at each height.

The qualifying round started with the bar at 3.00 metres, with the height increasing gradually to 3.65 metres. All vaulters clearing 3.65 metres advanced to the final.

The final had the bar initially at 3.40 metres, increasing to 3.50 metres, 3.60 metres, and then by 5 centimetres at a time until a winner was found.

== Records ==
These were the standing world and Olympic records (in metres) prior to the 1912 Summer Olympics.

World record	Marc Wright (USA)	4.02	Cambridge, United States	8 June 1912
Olympic record	Edward Cook (USA); Alfred Carlton Gilbert (USA)	3.71	London, United Kingdom of Great Britain and Ireland	24 July 1908

The Olympic record was equalized or improved 18 times during this competition. Finally Harry Babcock set a new Olympic record with 3.95 metres.

== Schedule ==
Date	Time	Round
Wednesday, 10 July 1912	14:15	Qualifying
Thursday, 11 July 1912	15:15	Final

== Results ==
Key

- o = Height cleared
- x = Height failed
- – = Height passed
- r = Retired
- SB = Season's best
- PB = Personal best
- NR = National record
- AR = Area record
- OR = Olympic record
- WR = World record
- WL = World lead
- NM = No mark
- DNS = Did not start
- DQ = Disqualified

=== Qualifying ===
Rank	Athlete	Nation	3.00	3.20	3.40	3.50	3.60	3.65	Height	Notes
1	William Halpenny	Canada	—	—	o	o	o	o	3.65	Q
1	Harry Babcock	United States	—	o	o	o	o	o	3.65	Q
1	Bill Fritz	United States	—	o	o	o	o	o	3.65	Q
1	Frank Murphy	United States	—	o	o	o	xxo	o	3.65	Q
1	Robert Pasemann	Germany	o	o	o	o	xxo	o	3.65	Q
1	Sam Bellah	United States	—	—	xo	xxo	xo	o	3.65	Q
1	Gordon Dukes	United States	—	xxo	o	xxo	o	o	3.65	Q
1	Frank Nelson	United States	o	—	o	o	o	xo	3.65	Q
1	Marc Wright	United States	—	—	o	o	o	xo	3.65	Q
1	Bertil Uggla	Sweden	o	o	o	o	o	xo	3.65	Q
1	Frank Coyle	United States	—	—	o	o	o	xxo	3.65	Q
12	Carl Hårleman	Sweden	—	xo	o	xo	o	xxx	3.60	
12	Richard Sjöberg	Sweden	o	o	o	o	xxo	xxx	3.60	
12	Clas Gille	Sweden	—	o	o	xxo	xxo	xxx	3.60	
15	Fernand Gonder	France	xo	xo	o	o	xxx	—N/a	3.50	
16	Ulrich Baasch	Russia	o	o	o	xxx	—N/a		3.40	
16	Fritz Bøchen Vikke	Denmark	o	o	o	xxx	—N/a		3.40	
18	Magnus Nilsson	Sweden	—	o	xxx	—N/a			3.20	
18	Hugo Svensson	Sweden	o	o	xxx	—N/a			3.20	
18	Sander Santesson	Sweden	xo	o	xxx	—N/a			3.20	
18	Viktor Franzl	Austria	xxo	o	xxx	—N/a			3.20	
18	Georgios Banikas	Greece	xo	xo	xxx	—N/a			3.20	
23	Jindřich Jirsák	Bohemia	o	xxx	—N/a				3.00	
23	Manlio Legat	Italy	o	xxx	—N/a				3.00	
—	Johann Martin	Russia	xxx	—N/a					No mark	

=== Final ===
Halpenny was forced to retire from the competition after he broke two ribs while clearing 3.80 metres and had to be carried off the field on a stretcher.

Rank	Athlete	Nation	3.40	3.50	3.60	3.65	3.75	3.80	3.85	3.95	4.06	Height	Notes
1st place, gold medalist(s)	Harry Babcock	United States	o	o	o	—	o	o	o	o	xxx	3.95	OR
2nd place, silver medalist(s)	Frank Nelson	United States	o	o	o	xo	o	o	xo	xxx	—N/a	3.85	
2nd place, silver medalist(s)	Marc Wright	United States	o	o	o	o	xo	xo	xo	xxx	—N/a	3.85	
3rd place, bronze medalist(s)	William Halpenny	Canada	o	xo	o	o	xo	xo	r	—N/a		3.80	
3rd place, bronze medalist(s)	Frank Murphy	United States	o	o	xo	xo	o	o	xxx	—N/a		3.80	
3rd place, bronze medalist(s)	Bertil Uggla	Sweden	o	o	o	o	o	xo	xxx	—N/a		3.80	
7	Sam Bellah	United States	o	o	xo	o	xo	xxx	—N/a			3.75	
8	Frank Coyle	United States	o	o	xo	xo	xxx	—N/a				3.65	
8	Gordon Dukes	United States	o	o	o	xxo	xxx	—N/a				3.65	
8	Bill Fritz	United States	o	xo	xo	xxo	xxx	—N/a				3.65	
11	Robert Pasemann	Germany	xo	xxx	—N/a							3.40	

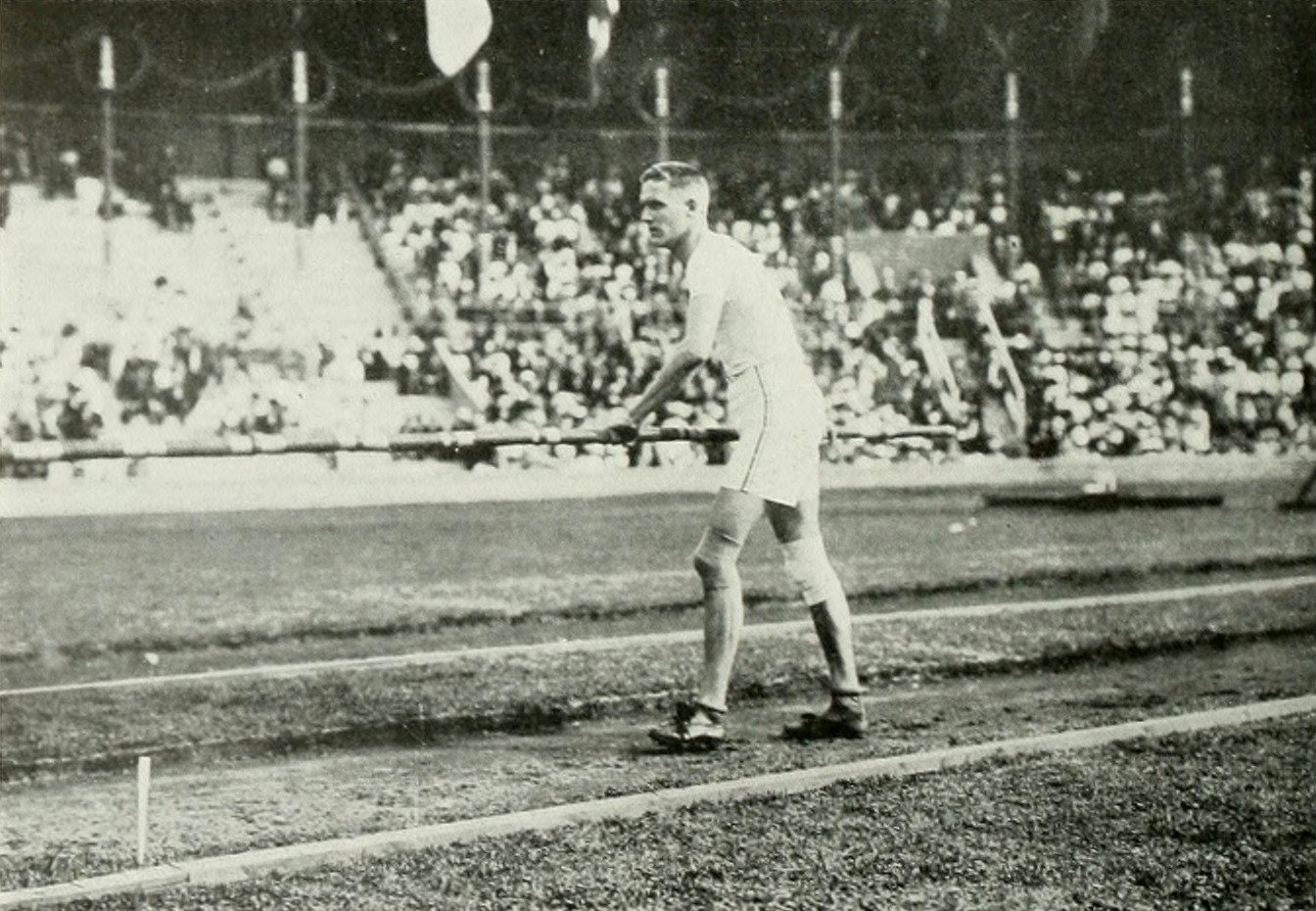
Harry Babcock on the way to win the gold medal.

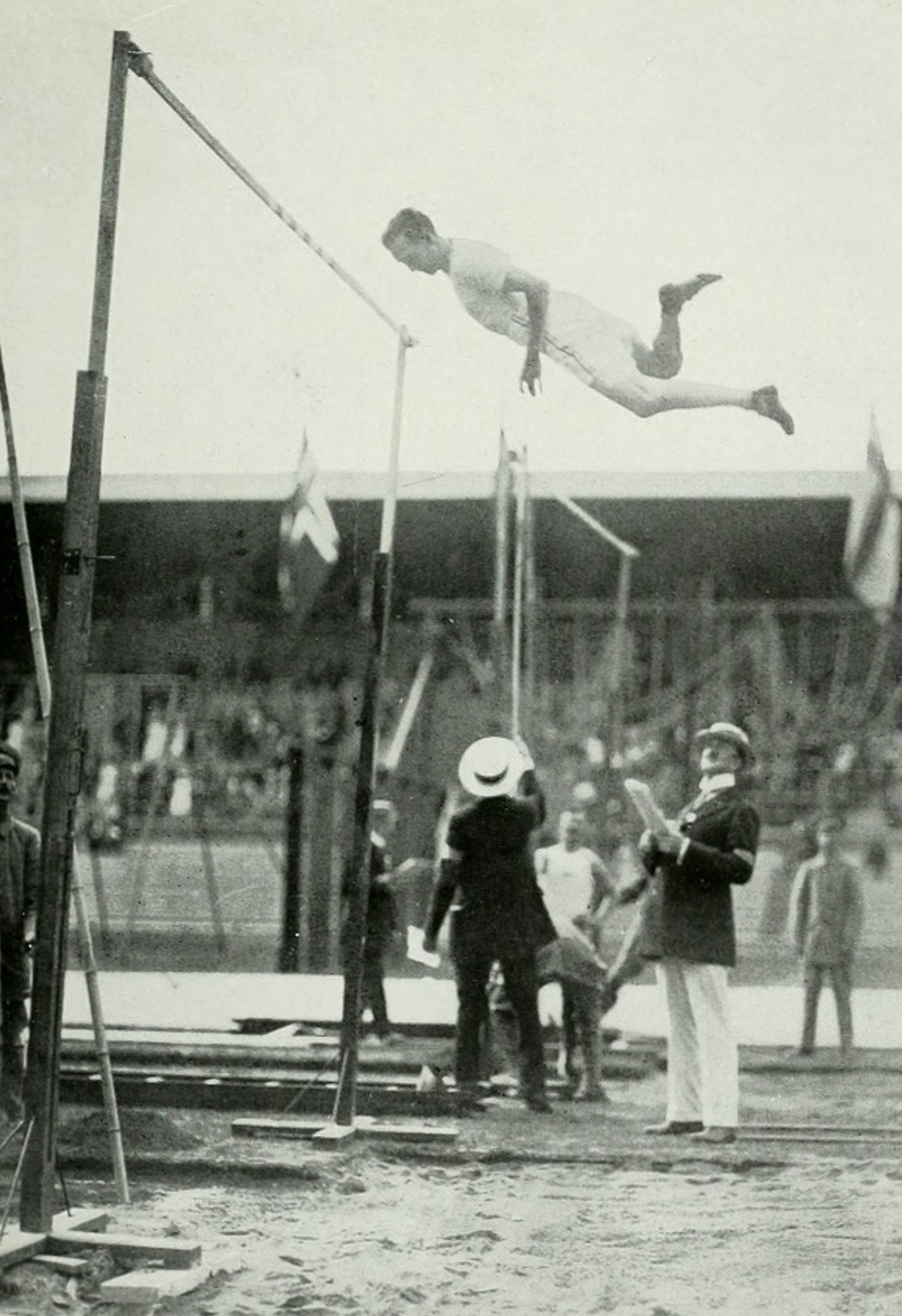
Frank Nelson winning the silver medal.

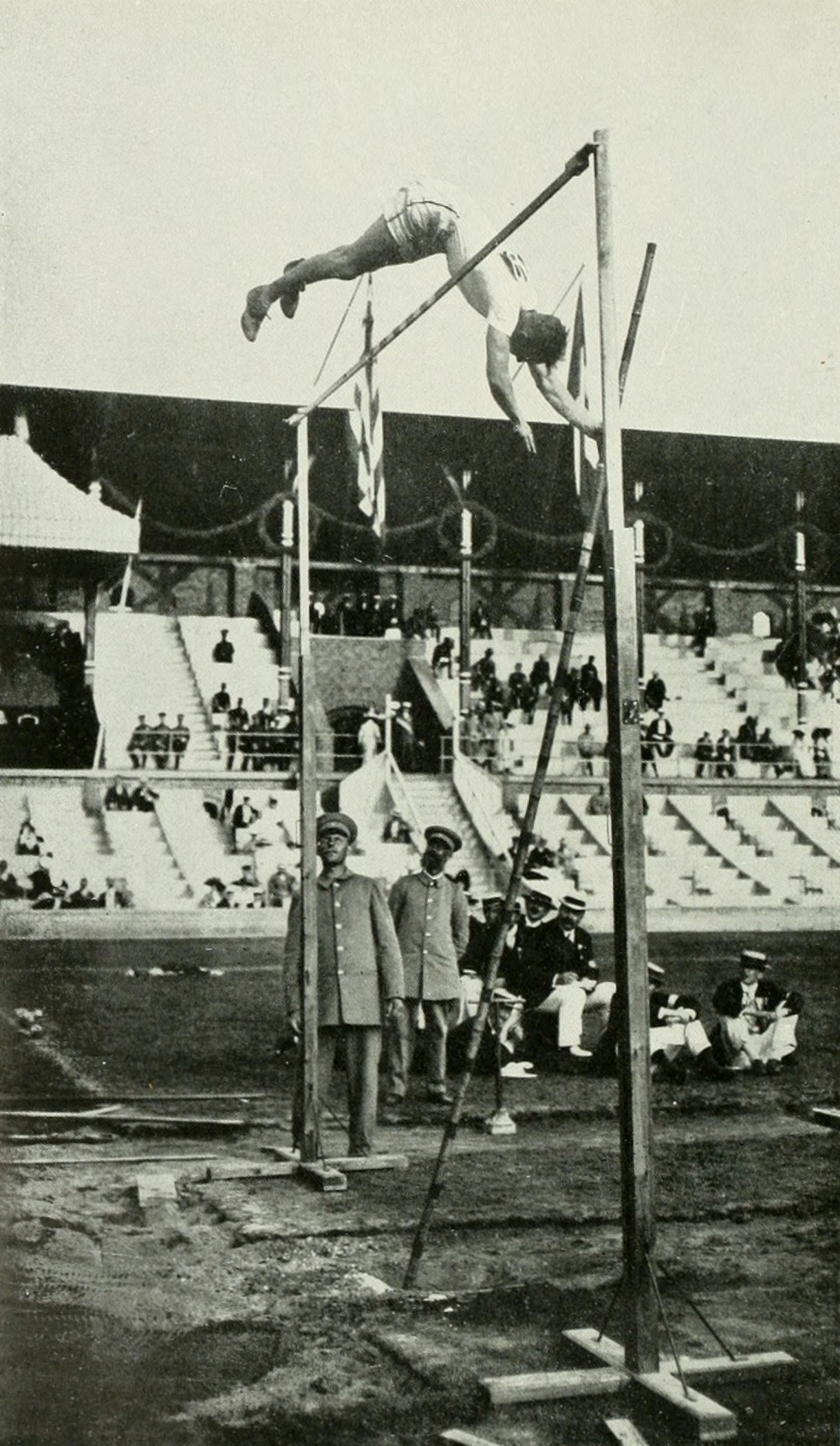
Second silver medalist Marc Wright.

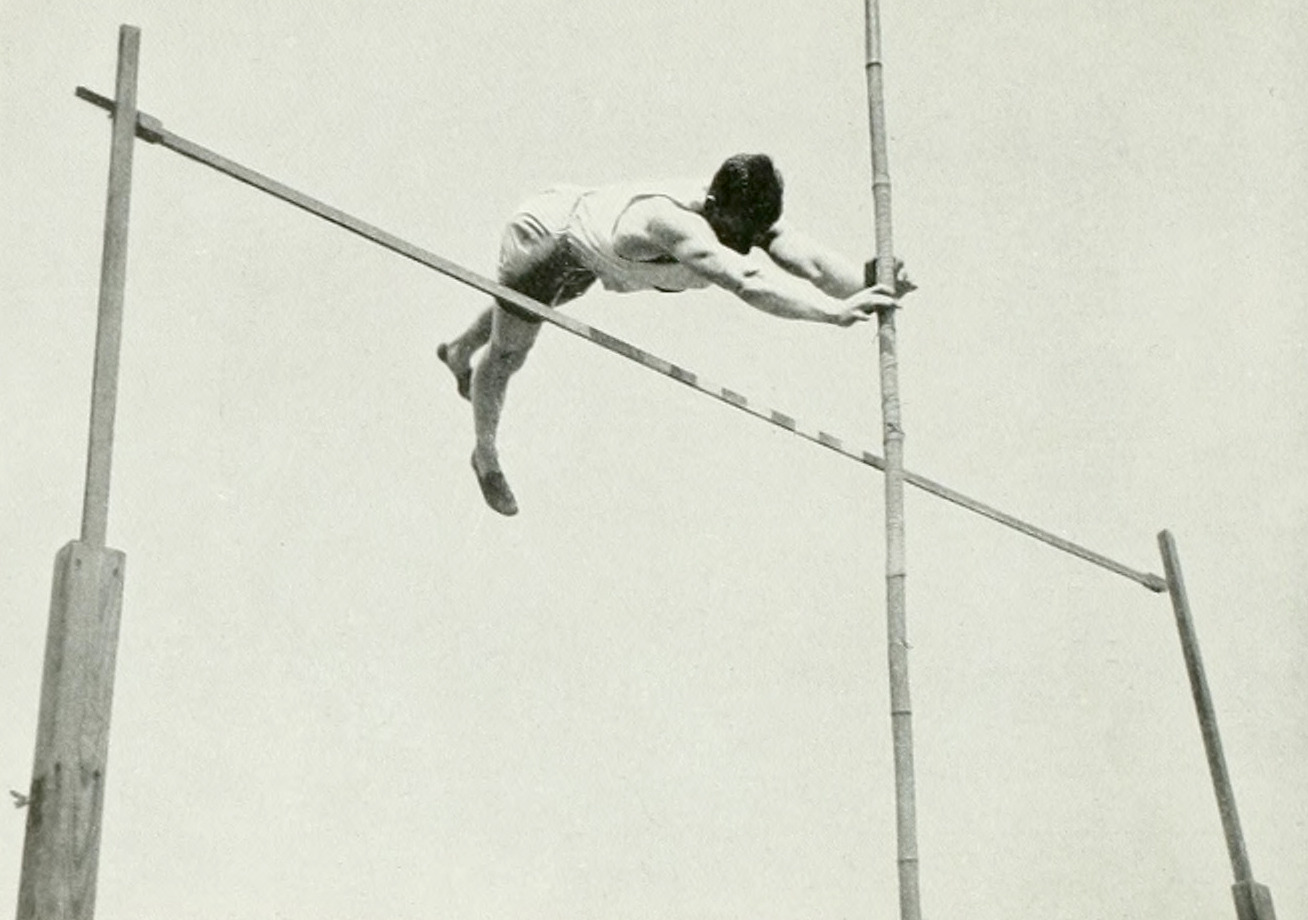
One of the three bronze medalists Bertil Uggla.

== Sources ==
- Bergvall, Erik, ed. (1913). The Official Report of the Olympic Games of Stockholm 1912. Translated by Adams-Ray, Edward. Stockholm: Wahlström & Widstrand.
- Wudarski, Pawel (1999). "Wyniki Igrzysk Olimpijskich" (in Polish).
