= Jirsák =

Jirsák (feminine: Jirsáková) is a Czech surname, derived from the given name Jiří. Notable people with the surname include:

- Jindřich Jirsák (1885–1938), Czech pole vaulter
- Tomáš Jirsák (born 1984), Czech footballer
