= Frank Murphy (pole vaulter) =

American pole vaulter (1889–1980)

Personal information
- Full name: Frank Dwyer Murphy
- Nationality: American
- Born: September 21, 1889 East Chicago, Illinois
- Died: June 11, 1980 (aged 90) Urbana, Illinois

Sport
- Country: United States
- Sport: Athletics
- Event: Pole Vault
Medal record
Men's athletics
Representing the United States
Bronze medal – third place	1912 Stockholm	Pole vault
- Updated on 24 August 2012

Frank Murphy (Frank Dwyer Murphy; September 21, 1889 – June 11, 1980) was an American track and field athlete who competed in the 1912 Summer Olympics which were held in Stockholm and where he won a bronze medal in the pole vault event in a three-way tie with William Halpenny and Bertil Uggla. In the pole vault event, Uggla and Murphy failed to clear 3.85 Metres with Halpenny previously withdrawing after breaking two ribs in clearing 3.80 Metres.

He was born in East Chicago, Illinois and died in Urbana, Illinois.
