= Frederick Schule =

American hurdler

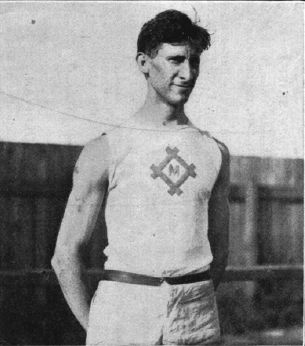
- Schule at the 1904 Summer Olympics in St. Louis

Personal information
- Full name: Frederick William Schule
- Born: September 27, 1879 Preston, Iowa, U.S.
- Died: September 14, 1962 (aged 82) Poughkeepsie, New York, U.S.
- Education: University of Wisconsin; University of Michigan

Sport
- Sport: Track and field
- Event: Hurdles
Medal record
Men's athletics
Representing the United States
Olympic Games
Gold medal – first place	1904 St. Louis	110 m hurdles

Frederick William Schule (September 27, 1879 – September 14, 1962) was an American track and field athlete, football player, athletic coach, teacher, bacteriologist, and engineer. He competed for the track and field teams at the University of Wisconsin from 1900 to 1901 and at the University of Michigan in 1904. He was also a member of the undefeated 1903 Michigan Wolverines football team that outscored its opponents 565 to 6.

In 1904, Schule won the gold medal in the 110 meter hurdles at the 1904 Summer Olympics in St. Louis, Missouri. From 1905 to 1907, he was employed as the director of the gymnasium and coach of the football and basketball teams at the University of Montana in Missoula, Montana.

Schule also worked as a school teacher in Wausau and Milwaukee, Wisconsin, and as an assayer and bacteriologist in Utah and Chicago. He later worked as an engineer and superintendent for Westinghouse Lamp Company. In 2008, he was posthumously inducted into the University of Michigan Track & Field Hall of Fame.

== Early years ==
Schule was born in Preston, Iowa in 1879. His father, Frederick Schule, was an immigrant from Germany who was employed as a physician. His mother, Sophia Schule, was also an immigrant from Germany. He had four older sisters, Clara, Augusta, Henrietta, and Sophia. At the time of the 1880 United States Census, the family was living in Fairfield Township, Jackson County, Iowa.

== University of Wisconsin ==
Schule began his collegiate studies at the University of Wisconsin, where he was a member of the track and field team from 1899 to 1900. In 1900, Schule won the Big Ten Conference championship in the long jump, becoming the first Wisconsin Badgers athlete to win a Big Ten championship in track and field. He repeated as Big Ten champion in the long jump in 1901 with a distance of 22 feet, 4-4/5 inches.

Schule received a Bachelor of Science degree from the University of Wisconsin in 1901 in bacteriology and chemistry. After receiving his degree, Schule worked as a bacteriologist for the Chicago Sanitary District for five months. He then returned to the University of Wisconsin for post graduate studies and as a fellow in bacteriology. From 1902 to 1903, he taught physics at a high school in Wausau, Wisconsin. He was the Amateur Athletic Union (AAU) champion in 120 yd (110 m) hurdles in 1903.

== University of Michigan ==
In the fall of 1903, Schule enrolled at the University of Michigan where he studied chemistry. He received a master's degree from Michigan in 1904.

While attending Michigan, Schule was also a member of the 1903 Michigan Wolverines football team coached by Fielding H. Yost. The 1903 football team compiled a record of 11-0-1 and outscored its opponents 565 to 6.

In February 1904, Schule announced that he would also compete for the 1904 Michigan Wolverines men's track and field team coached by Keene Fitzpatrick. At the annual Penn Relays Carnival held in Philadelphia in April 1904, Schule "left the field behind in the [120-yard] hurdle event, and won in the good time of 15 4/5 seconds." Schule also set a world record in the 75-yard hurdles while attending Michigan. Schule's record-setting time was 9-4/5 seconds at an indoor event in Milwaukee, Wisconsin on March 5, 1904.

In June 1904, the University of Michigan's Athletic Board of Control ruled that Schule was no longer eligible to compete for the school in intercollegiate athletics, because he had already competed for four years.

In 2008, Schule was posthumously inducted into the University of Michigan Track & Field Hall of Fame.

== 1904 Summer Olympics ==
Schule competed for the United States as a hurdler at the 1904 Summer Olympics in St. Louis. He won the gold medal in the 110 meter hurdle event with a time of 16.0 seconds, beating fellow American Thaddeus Shideler by two yards. Schule also competed in the 200 metre hurdles event and finished fifth. The 1904 Summer Olympics have been called the "Michigan Olympics" due to the fact that University of Michigan athletes (including Schule, shot putter Ralph Rose, sprinter Archie Hahn, and pole vaulter Charles Dvorak) won ten medals, including six gold medals.

== Coaching career ==
After competing in the 1904 Olympics, Schule was employed as an assayer and chemist in Utah from 1904 to 1905. In 1905, he was hired at the director of the gymnasium at the University of Montana in Missoula, Montana. He also served as an instructor and coach at the University of Montana. He was the head football coach from 1905 to 1906 and the head basketball coach from 1905 to 1907. In two season as the head football coach, Schule compiled a record of 4–7 as his teams were outscored by a combined total of 166 to 150.

== Later years ==
At the time of the 1910 United States census, Schule was living in Washington Township, Buchanan County, Missouri. He listed his occupation as a shoe merchant. He was also identified as a merchant residing in St. Joseph, Missouri in March 1912. Schule later worked a teacher at West Division High School in Milwaukee, Wisconsin.

In September 1918, Schule indicated in a draft registration card that he was living in East Orange, New Jersey, with his wife Flora Randolph Schule (born July 22, 1884, in Nortonville, Kansas). He listed his occupation as an engineer with the Westinghouse Lamp Company. At the time of the 1920 United States census, Schule was still living in East Orange with his wife Flora. They had three sons, Frederick W. Jr., Robert, and Paul. Schule listed his occupation as an electrical engineer.

At the time of the 1930 United States census, Schule was living in DeRuyter, New York, with his wife Flora and their three sons. At that time, he listed his occupation as a stock speculator.

At the time of the 1940 United States census, Schule was living with his wife Flora in Jersey City, New Jersey. He listed his occupation at that time as a superintendent for a lamp manufacturer and also indicated that he and his wife had resided in Owensboro, Kentucky in 1935. In 1942, Schule completed a draft registration card indicating that he was unemployed and living with his wife Flora R. Schule in Jersey City.

Schule spent much of his retirement years in DeRuyter, New York. He moved to Poughkeepsie, New York, in 1960 and died there in 1962. He was buried at the Hillcrest Cemetery in DeRuyter.

== Head coaching record ==
=== Football ===
Year	Team	Overall	Conference	Standing	Bowl/playoffs
Montana (Independent) (1905–1906)
1905	Montana	2–3			
1906	Montana	2–4			
Montana:		4–7			
Total:		4–7			
