= Frank Coyle =

American pole vaulter

Frank James Coyle (November 2, 1886 – February 20, 1947) was an American track and field athlete who competed in the 1912 Summer Olympics. He was born in Chicago, Illinois. In 1912, he finished eighth in the pole vault event.
