= Richard Sjöberg =

Swedish athletics competitor

Personal information
- Born: 20 September 1890 Karlskrona, Blekinge, Sweden
- Died: 14 September 1960 (aged 69) Stockholm, Sweden

Sport
- Sport: Athletics
- Event: high jump/pole jump
- Club: IFK Stockholm

Richard Gustafsson Sjöberg (20 September 1890 – 14 September 1960) was a Swedish athlete who competed in the 1912 Summer Olympics.

== Career ==
Sjöberg was selected to represent Sweden at his 1912 home Olympics in Stockholm. He finished 13th in the high jump competition. He finished twelfth in the pole vault event.

Sjöberg won the British AAA Championships title in the pole jump at the 1914 AAA Championships.
