= Eric Gardner =

Australian rules footballer

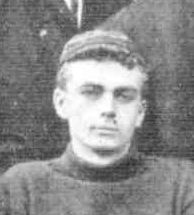

Personal information
- Full name: Eric Arthur Gardner
- Born: 27 June 1881; Hawthorn, Victoria, Australia
- Died: 24 May 1905 (aged 23); Västerås, Sweden
- Original team: Melbourne Grammar

Playing career^{1}
Years	Club	Games (Goals)
1900–1903	Melbourne	39 (13)
- ^{1} Playing statistics correct to the end of 1903.

Eric Arthur Gardner (27 June 1881 – 24 May 1905) was an Australian rules footballer who played with Melbourne in the Victorian Football League (VFL). The younger brother of Corrie Gardner, Eric was a long kicking forward. He played as a wingman and missed out on playing in Melbourne's 1900 premiership side, in his debut season, through injury.

He entered Trinity College (University of Melbourne) in 1900, where he was a member of the football team that won the 1902 intercollegiate premiership, and also participated in athletics, winning the 120-yard hurdles and coming third in the long jump and at the University sports day in 1902.

Gardner died young in 1905 while in Sweden.
