= Athletics at the 1904 Summer Olympics – Men's 110 metres hurdles =

Men's 110 metres hurdles at the Games of the III Olympiad
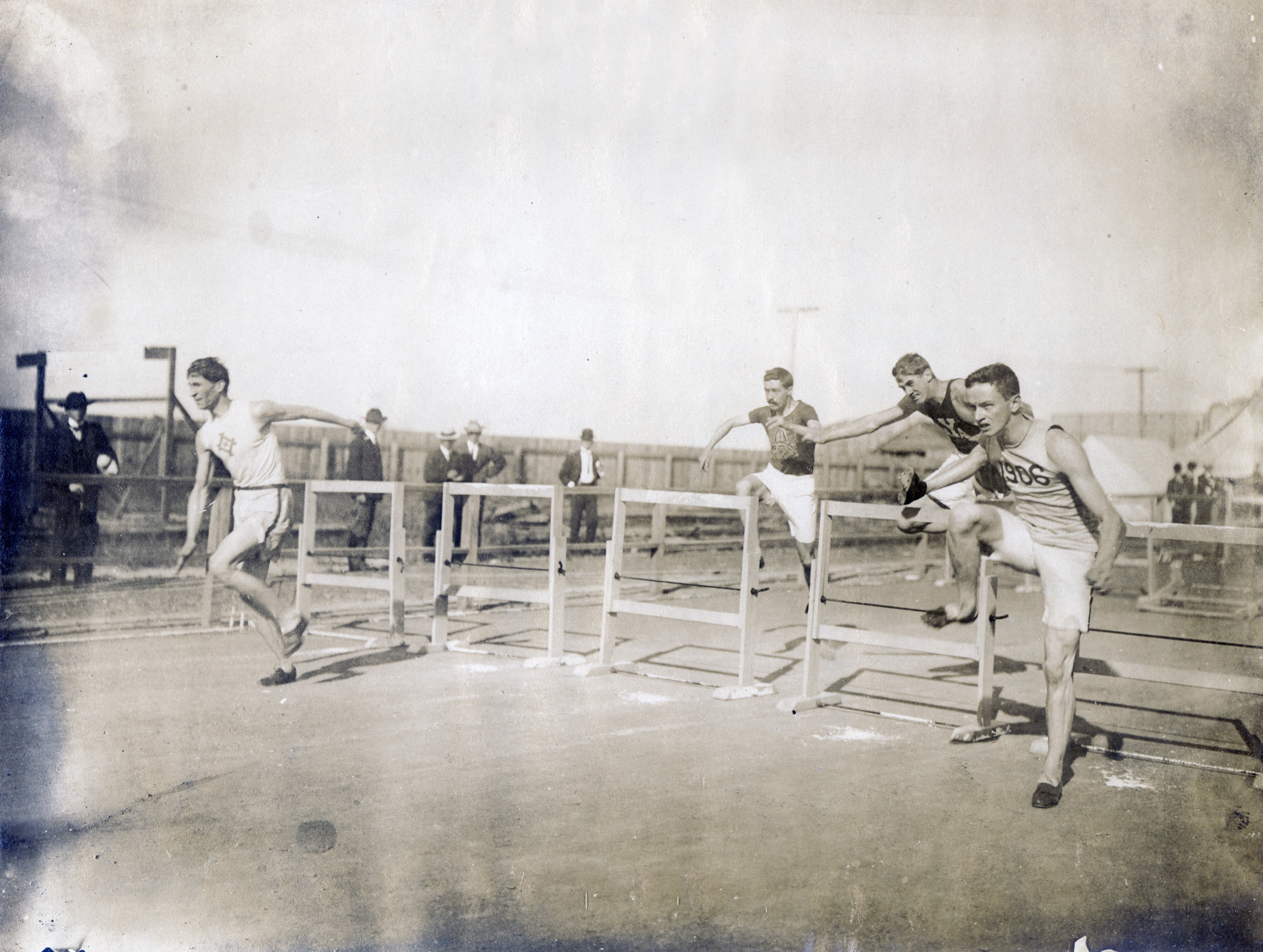
- The first heat of the 110 metres hurdles
- Venue: Francis Field
- Date: September 3, 1904
- Competitors: 6 from 2 nations
- Winning time: 16.0

Medalists
1st place, gold medalist(s)		Frederick Schule; United States
2nd place, silver medalist(s)		Thaddeus Shideler; United States
3rd place, bronze medalist(s)		Lesley Ashburner; United States

The men's 110 metres hurdles was a track and field athletics event held as part of the Athletics at the 1904 Summer Olympics programme. It was the third time the event was held. 6 hurdlers from 2 nations participated. The competition was held on September 3, 1904. The event was won by Frederick Schule of the United States, the third of five consecutive victories for the nation in the first five Olympic Games. It was also the second of four consecutive podium sweeps for the Americans in the event.

== Background ==
This was the third appearance of the event, which is one of 12 athletics events to have been held at every Summer Olympics. None of the hurdlers from 1900 returned. Edwin Clapp was the 1903 and 1904 IC4A champion and the American favorite; he entered but did not start. Thaddeus Shideler had matched Alvin Kraenzlein's 120 yards hurdles world record. Frederick Schule was the 1903 AAU champion, while Frank Castleman was the 1904 winner.

Australia made its first appearance in the event. The United States made its third appearance, the only nation to compete in the 110 metres hurdles in each of the first three Games.

== Competition format ==
There were two rounds: semifinals and a final. There were two semifinals, one with 2 runners and one with 4 runners after withdrawals. The top two runners in each of the semifinal heats advanced to the 4-man final.

== Records ==
These were the standing world and Olympic records (in seconds) prior to the 1904 Summer Olympics.

World record	15.0(*)	(United States) Thaddeus Shideler	St. Louis (USA)	June 11, 1904
Olympic record	15.4	(United States) Alvin Kraenzlein	Paris (FRA)	July 14, 1900

(*) unofficial 120 yards (= 109.73 m)

== Schedule ==
Date	Time	Round
Saturday, 3 September 1904		Semifinals; Final

== Results ==
=== Semifinals ===
The top two finishers in each semifinal heat advanced to the final.

==== Semifinal 1 ====
Rank	Athlete	Nation	Time	Notes
1	Frederick Schule	United States	16.2	Q
2	Lesley Ashburner	United States	Unknown	Q
3	Ward McLanahan	United States	Unknown	
4	Corrie Gardner	Australia	16.4	

==== Semifinal 2 ====
McPherson withdrew after learning that the hurdles were one foot lower than normal.

Rank	Athlete	Nation	Time	Notes
1	Frank Castleman	United States	16.2	Q
2	Thaddeus Shideler	United States	Unknown	Q
—	Leslie McPherson	Australia	DNS	
—	Edwin Clapp	United States	DNS	

=== Final ===
Rank	Athlete	Nation	Time
1st place, gold medalist(s)	Frederick Schule	United States	16.0
2nd place, silver medalist(s)	Thaddeus Shideler	United States	16.3
3rd place, bronze medalist(s)	Lesley Ashburner	United States	16.4
4	Frank Castleman	United States	Unknown

== Results summary ==
Rank	Athlete	Nation	Semifinals	Final
1st place, gold medalist(s)	Frederick Schule	United States	16.2	16.0
2nd place, silver medalist(s)	Thaddeus Shideler	United States	Unknown	16.3
3rd place, bronze medalist(s)	Lesley Ashburner	United States	Unknown	16.4
4	Frank Castleman	United States	16.2	Unknown
AC	Ward McLanahan	United States	Unknown	Did not advance
AC	Corrie Gardner	Australia	16.4	Did not advance
—	Leslie McPherson	Australia	DNS	Did not advance
—	Edwin Clapp	United States	DNS	Did not advance
—	C. R. Vincent	United States	DNS	Did not advance
—	Louis Mertz	United States	DNS	Did not advance
—	Lester Bailey	United States	DNS	Did not advance
—	Sam Jones	United States	DNS	Did not advance

== Sources ==
- Wudarski, Pawel (1999). "Wyniki Igrzysk Olimpijskich" (in Polish).
