= Corrie Gardner =

Australian rules footballer and athlete

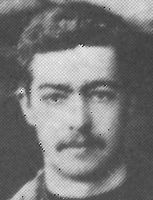

Personal information
- Full name: Henry Corris Gardner
- Born: 12 March 1879; South Melbourne, Victoria
- Died: 6 August 1960 (aged 81); Toorak, Victoria
- Original team: Melbourne Grammar
- Height: 171 cm (5 ft 7 in)
- Weight: 63 kg (139 lb)
- Position: Wing

Playing career^{1}
Years	Club	Games (Goals)
1898	Essendon	12 (0)
1900–1905	Melbourne	48 (0)
Total		60 (0)
- ^{1} Playing statistics correct to the end of 1905.

Career highlights
- VFL premiership player: 1900

Henry Corris "Corrie" Gardner (12 March 1879 – 6 August 1960) was an Australian track and field athlete who competed in the 1904 Summer Olympics, and played Australian rules football for Essendon Football Club and Melbourne Football Club.

Gardner was a member of the Melburnian Hare & Hounds Athletics Club and when aged 25 years old he travelled to St. Louis, Illinois, to compete at the 1904 Summer Olympics, on arrival he was surprised no accommodation had been arranged and was sent to a park to the tent community. In the competition he first entered the long jump, with no qualification round it was straight in to the final, there are no official records of the distance he jumped but it is known he finished outside the first six out of nine athletes. A couple of days later he was on the track competing in the 110 metres hurdles, although his time isn't known he did finish last in his heat so didn't qualify for the final later that day.

Gardner was the Australian national champion in the 1899–1900 season for the 120 yard hurdles, and also Australasia champion in the same event in 1903.

He also played Australian rules football, where he used his pace and running skills on the wing for the Essendon Football Club in 1898 and the Melbourne Football Club between 1900 and 1905. He was a member of Melbourne's first premiership side in 1900. His brother Eric also played for Melbourne, but missed playing in the premiership side due to injury.
