= Athletics at the 1904 Summer Olympics – Men's pole vault =

Men's pole vault at the Games of the III Olympiad
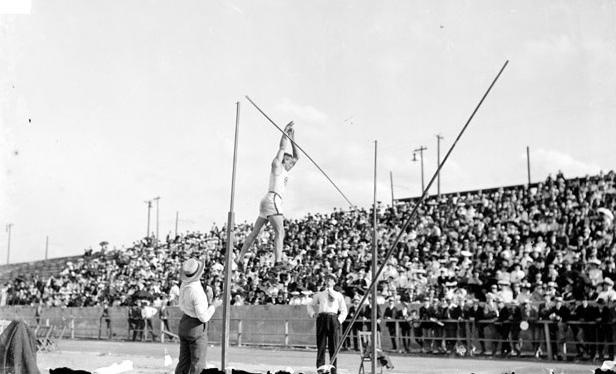
- Charles Dvorak in action on the way to his gold medal.
- Venue: Francis Field
- Date: September 3, 1904
- Competitors: 7 from 2 nations
- Winning height: 3.50 OR

Medalists
1st place, gold medalist(s)		Charles Dvorak; United States
2nd place, silver medalist(s)		LeRoy Samse; United States
3rd place, bronze medalist(s)		Louis Wilkins; United States

The men's pole vault was a track and field athletics event held as part of the Athletics at the 1904 Summer Olympics programme. It was the third time the event was held. Seven pole vaulters from two nations participated. The competition was held on Saturday, September 3, 1904. The event was won by Charles Dvorak of the United States, the nation's third consecutive victory in the event. With six of the seven vaulters, the United States swept the top three places—the first time that occurred in the pole vault, though the Americans had never had more than two vaulters compete previously. Through the 1904 Games, no American pole vaulter had ever placed lower than any non-American vaulter.

== Background ==
This was the third appearance of the event, which is one of 12 athletics events to have been held at every Summer Olympics. Charles Dvorak, who had expected to compete in 1900 but was foiled by machinations revolving around the Sunday schedule then, was able to compete in 1904. The French world record holder, Fernand Gonder, was not present. Most of the top Americans were; like many events in 1904, it was largely a United States championship.

Germany made its first appearance in the event. The United States made its third appearance, the only nation to have competed at every Olympic men's pole vault to that point.

== Competition format ==
There was a single round of vaulting. The bar was raised by 3 inches each time.

== Records ==
These were the standing world and Olympic records (in metres) prior to the 1904 Summer Olympics.

World Record	3.69^{*}	(France) Fernand Gonder	Paris (FRA)	4 June 1904
Olympic Record	3.30	(United States) William Hoyt	Athens (GRE)	10 April 1896
Olympic Record	3.30	(United States) Irving Baxter	Paris (FRA)	15 July 1900

^{*} unofficial

Charles Dvorak set a new Olympic record of 3.50 metres. All 5 of the vaulters whose results are known bested the previous Olympic record.

== Schedule ==
Date	Time	Round
Saturday, 3 September 1904		Final

== Results ==
Key

- o = Height cleared
- x = Height failed
- – = Height passed
- r = Retired
- SB = Season's best
- PB = Personal best
- NR = National record
- AR = Area record
- OR = Olympic record
- WR = World record
- WL = World lead
- NM = No mark
- DNS = Did not start
- DQ = Disqualified

The tie for second was resolved through a series of jump-offs. In the four-way jump-off, the jumpers started at 3.28 metres, which all succeeded at. Allen and McLanahan were unable to replicate their 3.35 metres success, while Samse and Wilkins both cleared that height as well as the 3.43 metres they had been unable to achieve in the main final. There was then a second series of head-to-head jump-offs; details are not known, though McLanahan beat Allen and Samse beat Wilkins.

Rank	Athlete	Nation	3.35	3.43	3.50	3.71	Height	Notes
1st place, gold medalist(s)	Charles Dvorak	United States	o	o	o	x	3.50	OR
2nd place, silver medalist(s)	LeRoy Samse	United States	o	x	—N/a		3.35	
3rd place, bronze medalist(s)	Louis Wilkins	United States	o	x	—N/a		3.35	
4	Ward McLanahan	United States	o	x	—N/a		3.35	
5	Claude Allen	United States	o	x	—N/a		3.35	
6	Walter Dray	United States	Unknown					
7	Paul Weinstein	Germany	Unknown					

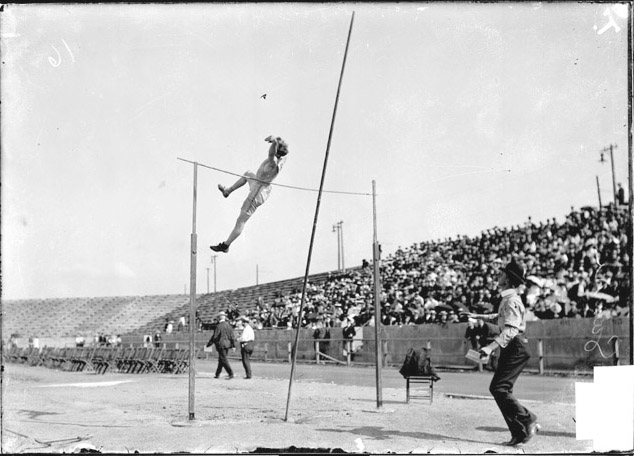
LeRoy Samse clearing the bar on the way to the silver medal.

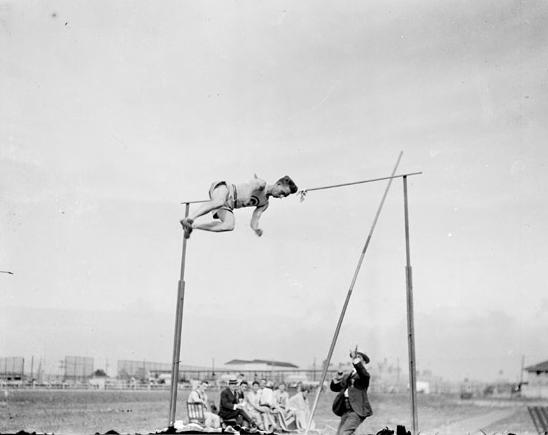
Louis Wilkins clearing the bar on the way to the bronze medal.

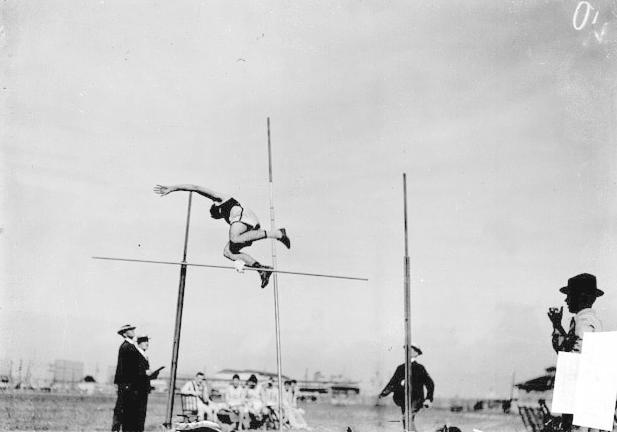
Ward McLanahan in action on the way to finish in fourth place.

== Sources ==
- Wudarski, Pawel (1999). "Wyniki Igrzysk Olimpijskich" (in Polish).
