= Ulrich Baasch =

Russian pole vaulter

- Born: February 23, 1890; Saint Petersburg, Russia
- Died: Unknown
- Occupation: Track and field athlete

Ulrich Baasch (born 23 February 1890; date of death unknown) was a Russian track and field athlete who competed for the Russian Empire in the 1912 Summer Olympics. In 1912, he finished 16th in the pole vault competition. He was born in Saint Petersburg.
