= Bill Fritz (pole vaulter) =

American pole vaulter (1892–1941)

Bill Fritz (William Howard Fritz, Jr.; March 22, 1892 – December 18, 1941) was an American track and field athlete who competed in the 1912 Summer Olympics. He was born in Berwyn, Pennsylvania. In 1912, he finished eighth in the pole vault event.
