= Thaddeus Shideler =

American hurdler

Olympic medal record

Men's athletics

Representing the United States
Silver medal – second place	1904 St. Louis	110 meters hurdles

Thaddeus Rutter Shideler (October 17, 1883 – June 22, 1966) was an American hurdler who competed in the early twentieth century. He competed in athletics at the 1904 Summer Olympics and won a silver medal in the 110 meters hurdles. Fred Schule won the gold medal.

Competing for Indiana University, Shideler held an unofficial world record set a month before the 1904 Summer Olympics with a time of 15.0 seconds in the 100 meters hurdle. The watch of one of the three timers failed to start costing Shideler official verification for the mark.
