= Lesley Ashburner =

American hurdler

Olympic medal record

Men's athletics

Representing the United States
Bronze medal – third place	1904 St Louis	110 metre hurdles

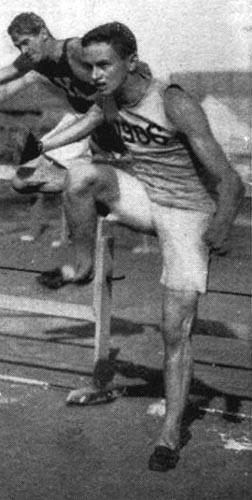
Lesley Ashburner

Lesley Ashburner (October 2, 1883 in Philadelphia, Pennsylvania – November 12, 1950 in Bethesda, Maryland) was an American athlete who competed mainly in the 110 metre hurdles.

He competed for the United States in the 1904 Summer Olympics held in St Louis, United States in the 110 metre hurdles where he won the bronze medal.

Ashburner graduated from Cornell University in 1906, where he was a member of the Quill and Dagger society. He had a wife, Nancy Miley, and a daughter, Roberta. After athletics he worked as a civil engineer. He died at his home in Bethesda, Md.
