= Ward McLanahan =

American pole vaulter and hurdler

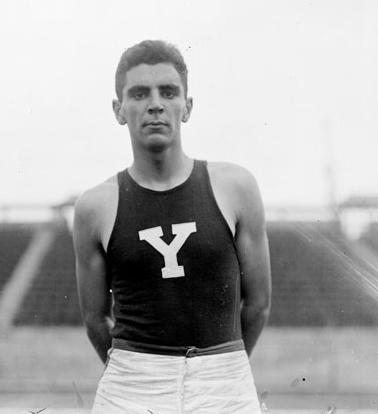
McLanahan at the 1904 Summer Olympics.

Craig Ward McLanahan (January 15, 1883 – December 11, 1974) was an American track and field athlete who competed in the 1904 Summer Olympics.

In 1904 he finished fourth in pole vault competition. He also participated in the 110 metre hurdles event but was eliminated in the first round.

He was born in Hollidaysburg, Pennsylvania.
