= Walter Dray =

American pole vaulter

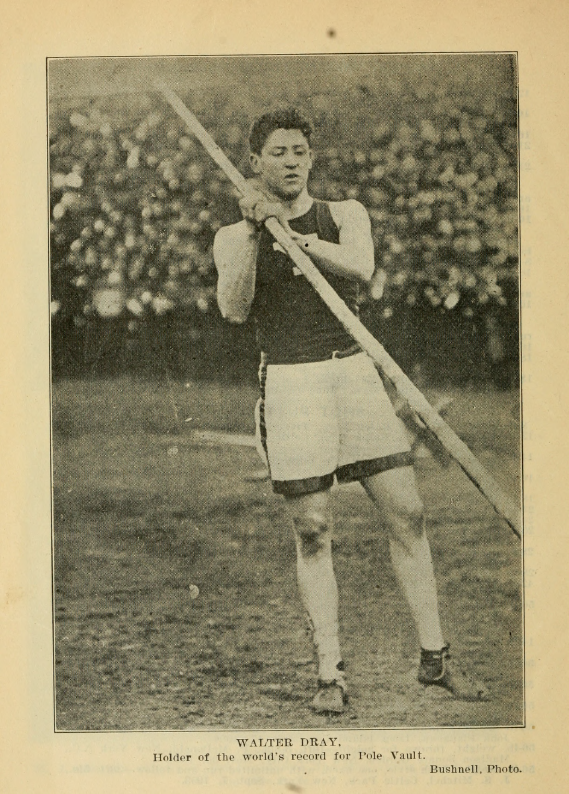
Walter R. Dray, holder of the world record for the pole vault of 12ft 9 1/2in (3.90m) set at Danbury, Connecticut, 13 June 1908.

Walter Remy Dray (March 21, 1886 in Peoria, Illinois – April 1, 1973 in Yorkville, Illinois) was an American track and field athlete who competed in the 1904 Summer Olympics. Dray attended Yale University, where he was the captain of the track team. He held the world record in pole vault three separate times. In 1904 he was sixth in pole vault competition. He died in Yorkville, Illinois, aged 87.
