= Louis Wilkins =

American pole vaulter (1882–1950)

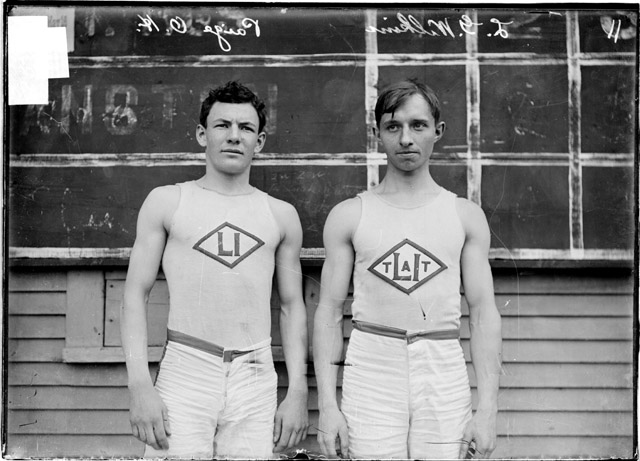
- Athletes O. H. Paige and Louis Wilkins

Medal record

Men's athletics

Representing the United States

Olympic Games
Bronze medal – third place	1904 St Louis	Pole vault

Louis Gary Wilkins (December 10, 1882 – April 6, 1950) was an American athlete who competed mainly in the pole vault. He competed for the United States in the 1904 Summer Olympics held in St Louis, United States in the pole vault where he won the bronze medal.
