= Jindřich Jirsák =

Czech pole vaulter

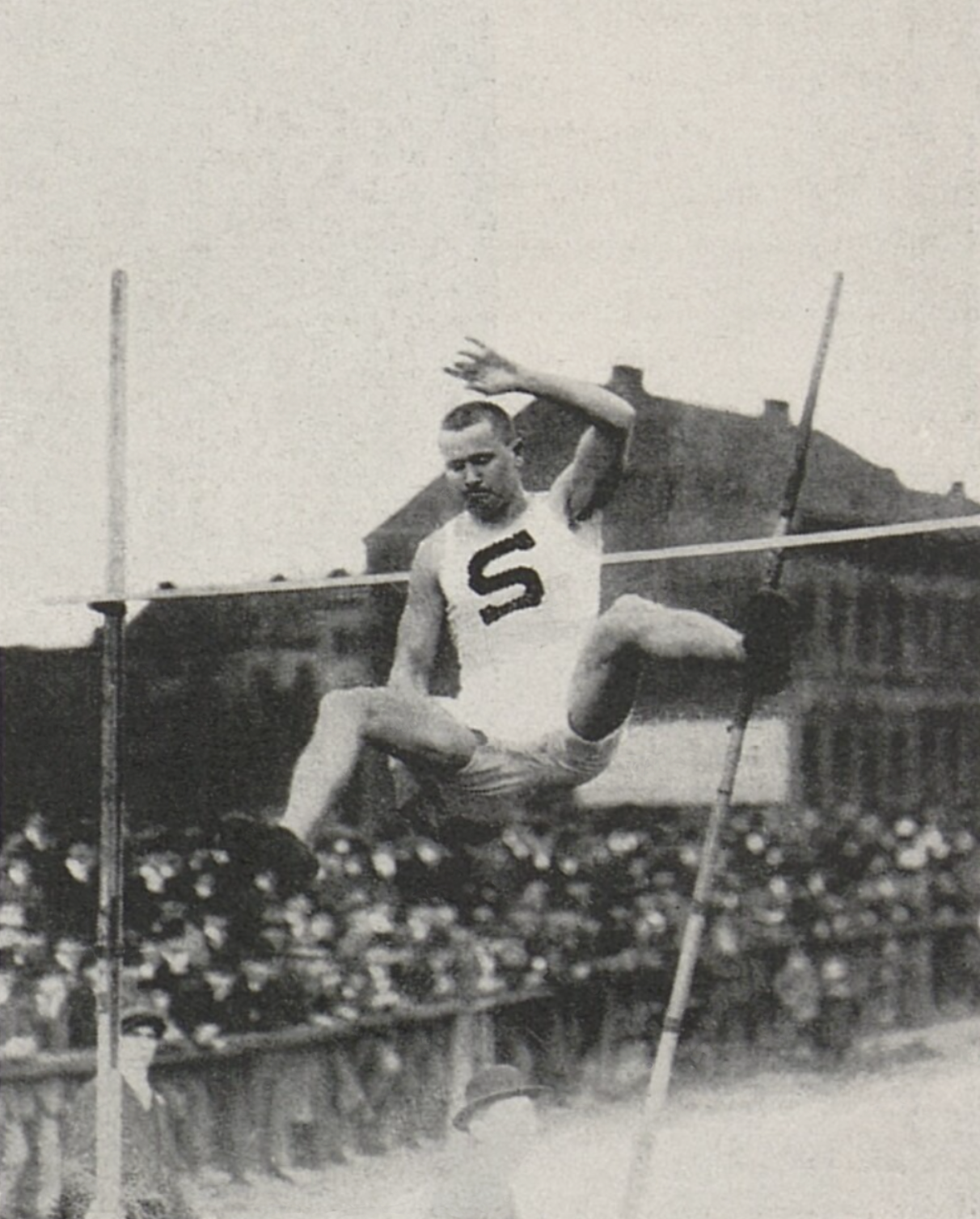

Personal information
- Nationality: Bohemia / Czechoslovakia
- Born: 27 February 1885 Rokycany, Bohemia, Austria-Hungary
- Died: 1938 (aged 52–53)

Sport
- Sport: Athletics
- Event: Pole vault

Jindřich Jirsák (27 February 1885 – 1938) was a Czech athlete specialized in the pole vault. He set two times the national record, and was the national record holder between 1912 and 1930. He competed at the 1912 Summer Olympics.

Jirsák was born in Rokycany on 27 February 1885. He competed in athletics and was specialized in pole vaulting. He represented Bohemia at the 1912 Summer Olympics in Stockholm. In the pole vault event he set a new national record, clearing 3.00 metres. At these olympics he was also entered for four other events; the 4 × 100 metres relay, the 4 × 400 metres relay, the pentathlon, and the decathlon, but he did not start all of them.

In 1914 he improved his national record with a vault of 3.74 metres. This was the national record 18 years long until 1930.

He was also scheduled to represent Czechoslovakia at the 1924 Summer Olympics in Paris in the pole vault event. However, he did not start.

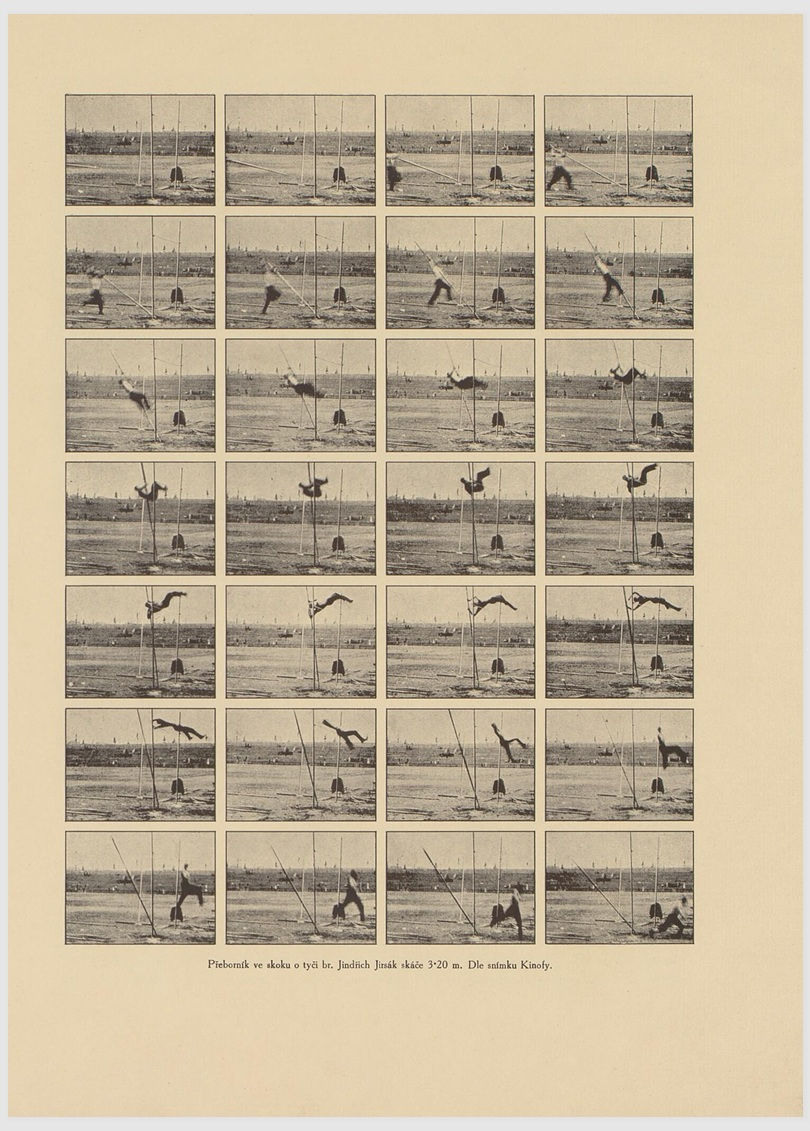
Jindřich Jirsák successfully performing a 3.20 meter high pole vault at the 6th Prague Sokol Slet in 1912, from video stills reproduced on page 260a in the commemorative publication for that Slet
