= LeRoy Samse =

American pole vaulter (1883–1956)

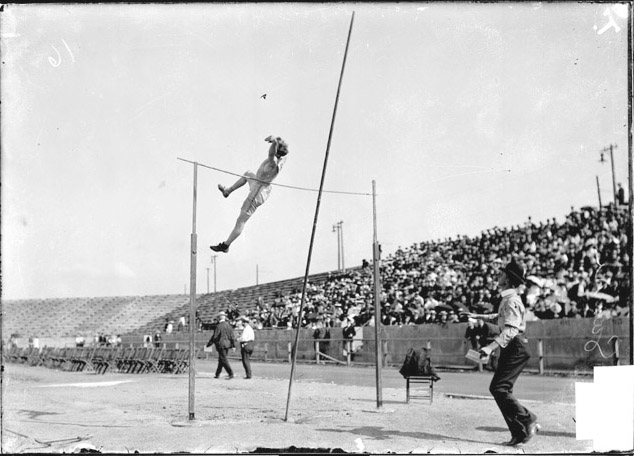

Medal record

Men's athletics

Representing the United States

Olympic Games
Silver medal – second place	1904 St Louis	Pole vault

LeRoy Perry Samse (September 13, 1883 – May 1, 1956) was an American athlete who competed mainly in the pole vault. Samse represented the United States in the 1904 Summer Olympics held in St Louis, United States in the pole vault where he won the silver medal.

Samse attended Kokomo High School from 1899 to 1902, before enrolling at Indiana University where he was reportedly introduced to the pole vault by coach James H. Horne. Samse was acknowledged for having set a world record in the pole vault at a Western Intercollegiate Conference meet in Evanston, Illinois on June 2, 1906. His vault of 12' 4 7/8" beat the mark of 12' 3" set three days earlier in New York by Alfred Carlton Gilbert of Yale University.

After graduating Samse traveled with a triple bar horizontal act, followed by an aerial act that played county fairs. In 1920 he was hired as Physical Education director in the Los Angeles school system. He retired in 1946.

In 2009, Indiana University put on the first ever LeRoy Samse Invitational, an informal meeting where vaulters are required to jump on non-bending poles similar to Samse's. The inaugural meet was won by Vera Neuenswander on the women's side (9 feet), and Jeff Coover on the men's side (12 feet). The meet record is still considered to be Samse's personal record of 12' 4 7/8".
