= Carl Albert Andersen =

Norwegian gymnast and pole vaulter (1876–1951)

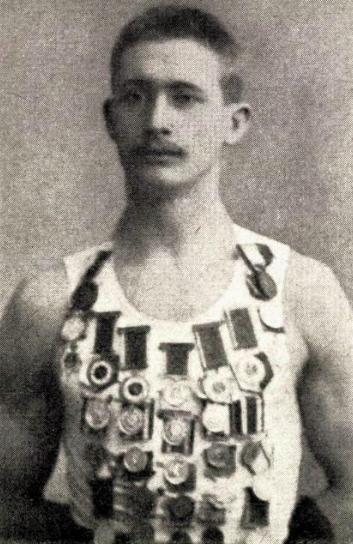
- Andersen c. 1900

Personal information
- Nickname: Flisa
- Born: 15 August 1876 Østre Aker, United Kingdoms of Sweden and Norway
- Died: 28 September 1951 (aged 75) Oslo, Norway

Gymnastics career
- Discipline: Men's artistic gymnastics
- Country represented: Norway
- Club: Idrettsforeningen Ørnulf, Chistiania Turnforening
Medal record
Men's artistic gymnastics
Representing Norway
Olympic Games
| Silver medal – second place | 1908 London | Team |
Intercalated Games
| Gold medal – first place | 1906 Athens | Team |
Men's athletics
Representing Norway
Olympic Games
| Bronze medal – third place | 1900 Paris | Pole vault |

Carl Albert Andersen (15 August 1876 in Østre Aker – 28 September 1951 in Oslo) was a Norwegian pole vaulter, high jumper, and gymnast who competed in the 1900 Summer Olympics, 1906 Intercalated Games and the 1908 Summer Olympics.

As an athlete Andersen represented the IF Ørnulf club and set many Norwegian national records as well as being national champion in the pole vault and high jump in 1896, 1897 and 1900.

Andersen participated in Athletics at the 1900 Summer Olympics in Paris and competed in two field events, and won the bronze medal in the pole vault, he jumped 3.20 metres and finished behind two Americans Irving Baxter and Meredith Colket, earlier in the day he had competed in the high jump and jumped 1.70 metres to finish tied for fourth place just 5 centimetres behind another bronze medal.

At the 1906 Intercalated Games in Athens, he was a member of the Norwegian gymnastics team, which consisted of 20 gymnasts, and went on to win the gold medal in the team, Swedish system event ahead of Denmark, he also competed in the individual all round five events competition and finished in 23rd position.

Andersen also competed at the 1908 Summer Olympics in London, again he was part of the Norwegian gymnastics team that participated in the All round team event, and this time they finished in second place behind the Swedish team.

Andersen died in his hometown of Oslo in 1951 aged 75.
