= Georgios Banikas =

Greek pole vaulter

Personal information
- Nationality: Greek
- Born: 19 May 1888
- Died: 9 April 1956 (aged 67)

Sport
- Sport: Athletics
- Event: Pole vault

Georgios Banikas (19 May 1888 – 9 April 1956) was a Greek athlete. He competed in the men's pole vault at the 1908 Summer Olympics and the 1912 Summer Olympics.
