= Gordon Dukes =

American pole vaulter

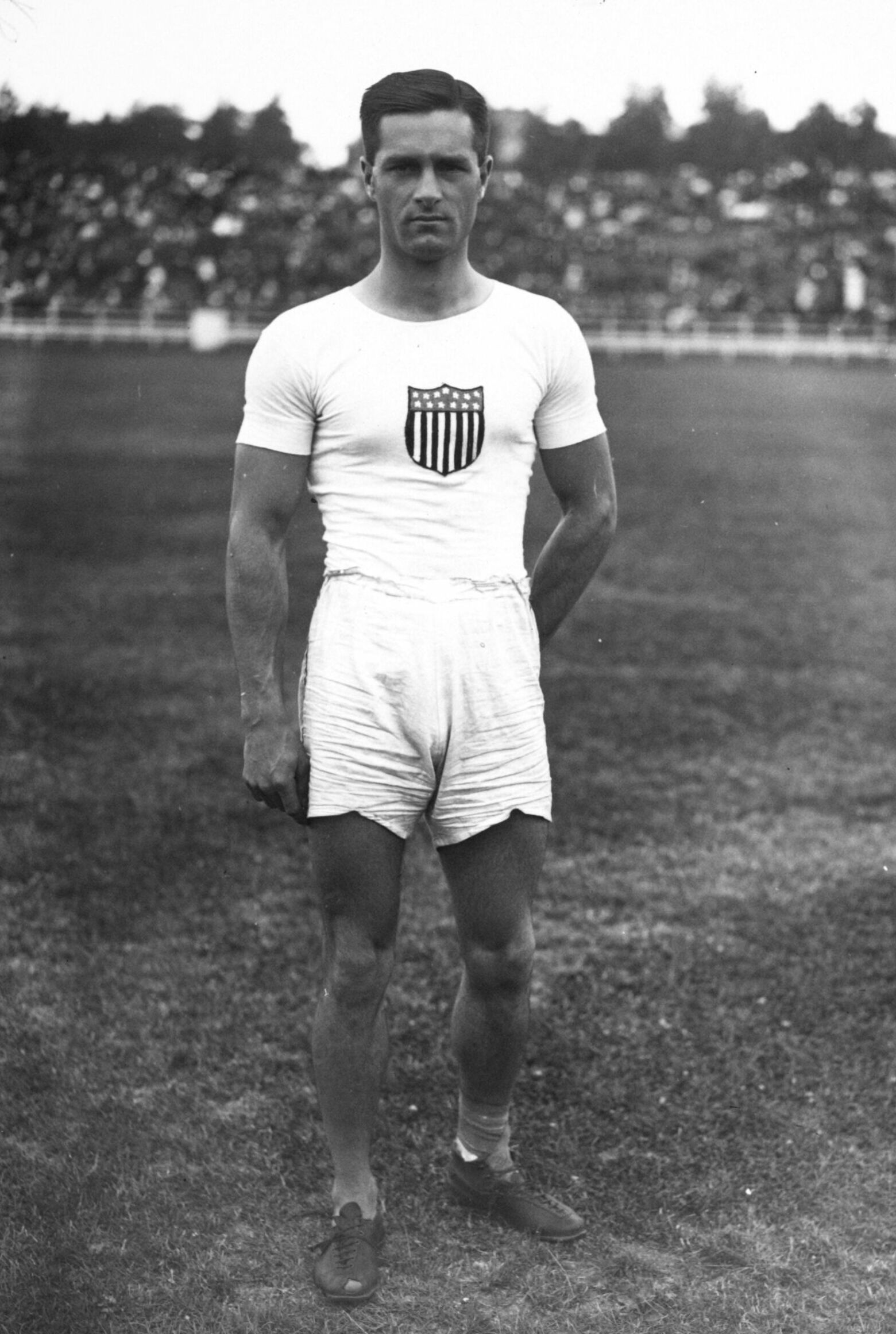
- Gordon Dukes in 1912

Personal information
- Born: December 23, 1888 Kobe, Japan
- Died: January 27, 1966 (aged 77) Barcelona, Spain
- Height: 1.78 m (5 ft 10 in)
- Weight: 70 kg (150 lb)

Sport
- Sport: Athletics
- Event: Pole vault
- Club: NYAC, New York

Achievements and titles
- Personal best: 3.835 m (1911)

Gordon Bennett Dukes (December 23, 1888 – January 27, 1966) was an American pole vaulter. He competed at the 1912 Summer Olympics and finished eighth. Dukes won the AAU championship in 1911 and placed second in 1912.
