= Athletics at the 1900 Summer Olympics – Men's pole vault =

Men's pole vault at the Games of the II Olympiad
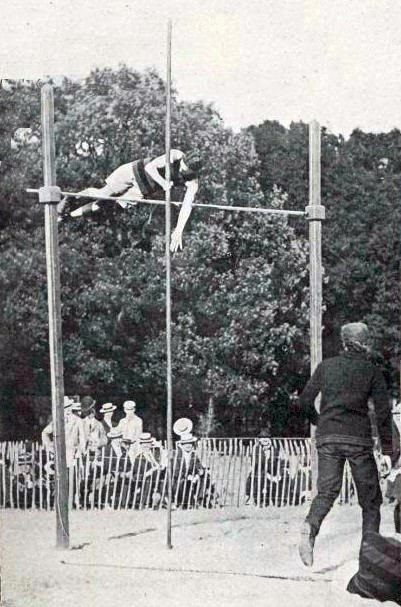
- Irving Baxter vaulting
- Venue: Bois de Boulogne
- Date: July 15, 1900
- Competitors: 8 from 5 nations
- Winning height: 3.30 =OR

Medalists
1st place, gold medalist(s)		Irving Baxter; United States
2nd place, silver medalist(s)		Meredith Colket; United States
3rd place, bronze medalist(s)		Carl Albert Andersen; Norway

The men's pole vault was a track & field athletics event at the 1900 Summer Olympics in Paris. It was held on July 15, 1900. Eight athletes from five nations competed in the pole vault.

This event was heavily protested by the United States team, as it was held on a Sunday and three of the top American vaulters had been told that they could vault on the following day and have the results count. The French organizers, however, ruled on July 14 that the results of Sunday competitions would be final. The American vaulters did not learn of that decision until after the event. The two that did compete were not regularly vaulters—Baxter had just finished winning the high jump when the pole vault began and decided to join the competition. He won, with teammate Meredith Colket finishing second. Carl Albert Andersen of Norway took bronze.

== Background ==
This was the second appearance of the event, which is one of 12 athletics events to have been held at every Summer Olympics. The American team was heavily favored, though the ruling that the Sunday competition would be final eliminated top competitors Charles Dvorak, Dan Horton, and Bascom Johnson, who were unaware of the ruling and expected to compete the following day.

France, Hungary, Norway, and Sweden each made their first appearance in the event. The United States was the only nation to have pole vaulters at both the 1896 and 1900 Games.

== Competition format ==
There was a single round of vaulting.

== Records ==
These were the standing world and Olympic records (in metres) prior to the 1900 Summer Olympics.

World record	Raymond Clapp (USA)	3.62^{*}	Chicago, United States	16 June 1896
Olympic record	William Hoyt (USA)	3.30	Athens, Greece	10 April 1896 (NS)

^{*} unofficial

Irving Baxter equalized the Olympic record with 3.30 metres.

== Schedule ==
The Sunday schedule prevented some Americans from competing. Because the event was held immediately after the high jump, the high jump winner (Irving Baxter) decided to compete.

Date	Time	Round
Sunday, 15 July 1900	16:30	Final

== Results ==
Baxter, despite being a high jumper who had little experience in pole vaulting and having just finished the high jump competition, was the top vaulter. Along with the other medallists, he cleared 3.10 metres first, then 3.20 metres. Andersen could not clear 3.25 while both the Americans did. That was the highest vault that Colket could accomplish, however, and Baxter's 3.30 was enough to win.

Rank	Athlete	Nation	Height	Notes
1st place, gold medalist(s)	Irving Baxter	United States	3.30	=OR
2nd place, silver medalist(s)	Meredith Colket	United States	3.25	
3rd place, bronze medalist(s)	Carl Albert Andersen	Norway	3.20	
4	Émile Gontier	France	3.10	
4	Jakab Kauser	Hungary	3.10	
4	Eric Lemming	Sweden	3.10	
7	Karl Staaf	Sweden	2.80	
8	August Nilsson	Sweden	2.60	

Instead of a medal, Baxter received an umbrella.

== Unofficial subsequent competitions ==
Following the official event on Sunday, two additional pole vault competitions were held on Monday (16 July) and Thursday (19 July). Only the winner is known from the 16 July competition; the 19 July competition was held after the handicap pole vault and the top two finishers are known.

They were both hosted by the French Olympic officials, by request of the American athletes who did not compete on Sunday thinking their later marks would count for medals. These competitions were considered to be outside of the Olympic events by the French officials at the time.

16 July scratch competition
Rank	Athlete	Nation	Height
1	Bascom Johnson	United States	3.38

19 July scratch competition
Rank	Athlete	Nation	Height
1	Daniel Horton	United States	3.45
2	Charles Dvorak	United States	3.35

== Sources ==
- International Olympic Committee.
- De Wael, Herman. Herman's Full Olympians: "Athletics 1900". Accessed 18 March 2006. Available electronically at.
- Mallon, Bill (1998). The 1900 Olympic Games, Results for All Competitors in All Events, with Commentary. Jefferson, North Carolina: McFarland & Company, Inc., Publishers. ISBN 0-7864-0378-0.
