= Frank Nelson (athlete) =

American pole vaulter

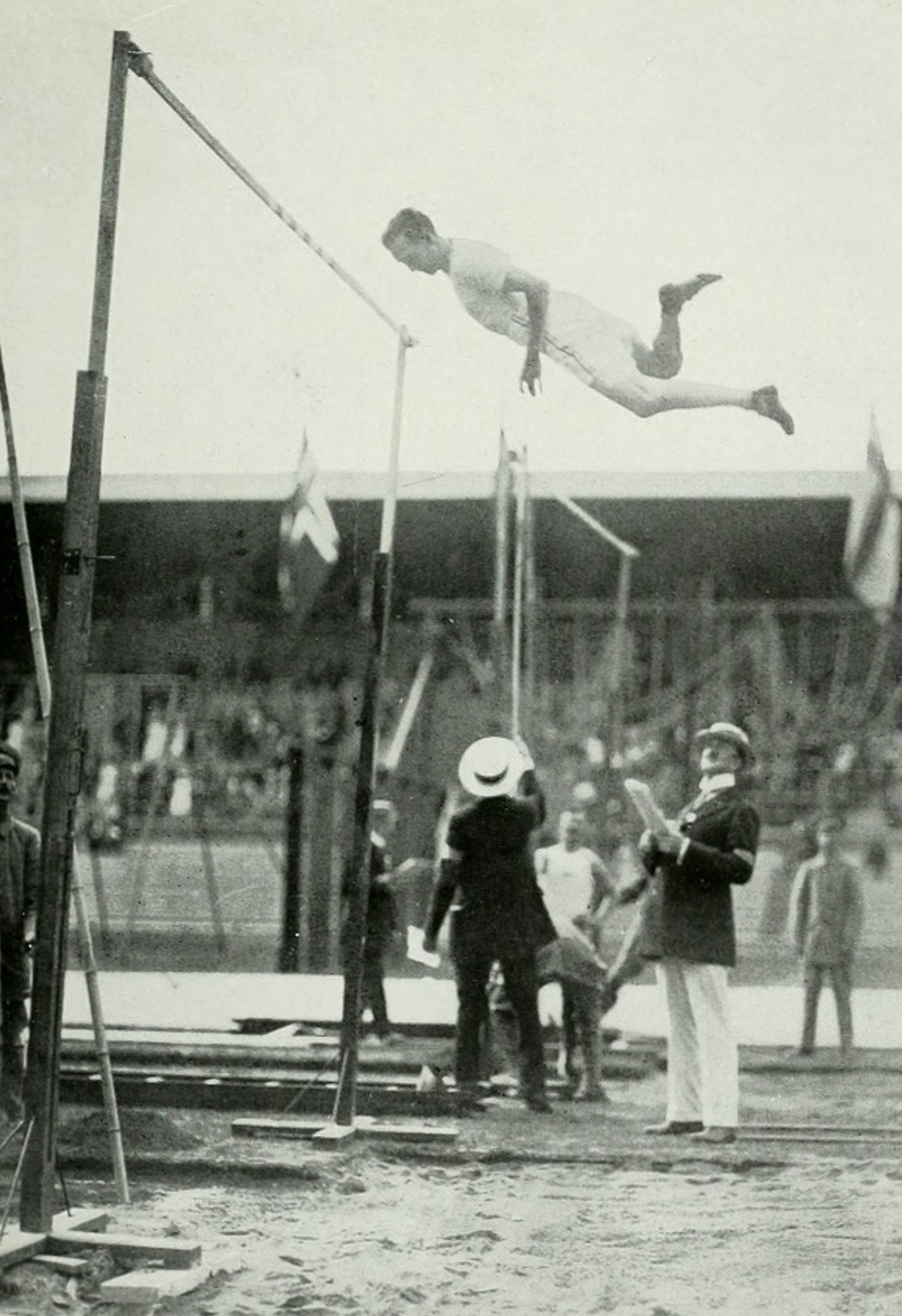
- Nelson at the 1912 Summer Olympics

Medal record

Men's athletics

Representing the United States

Olympic Games
Silver medal – second place	1912 Stockholm	Pole vault

Frank Thayer Nelson (May 22, 1887 – July 16, 1970) was an American athlete and baseball player who competed in the 1912 Summer Olympics. He was born in Detroit, Michigan and died in Grosse Pointe, Michigan.

Nelson competed for the United States in the 1912 Summer Olympics held in Stockholm, Sweden in the pole vault, where he won the silver medal. At the same Olympics, he competed in the baseball event, which was held as demonstration sport. Nelson was one of four Americans who played for the Swedish team.

He graduated from Lawrenceville, class of 1906, and Yale, class of 1910. He was a lifelong member of the Les Cheneaux Club on Marquette Island in northern Lake Huron. Nelson also attended the all-boys Detroit University School from 1900 through his junior year, 1905. The school is now known as University Liggett School, located in Grosse Pointe Woods, Michigan. Nelson's classmate, John Neil Patterson, DUS '06, was a member of the 1908 USA Olympic team as a high jumper (7th place) and a hurdler. Nelson was a late replacement in the pole vault competition for Paul Maxon, another 1906 DUS graduate.
