= Marc Wright =

American pole vaulter (1890–1975)

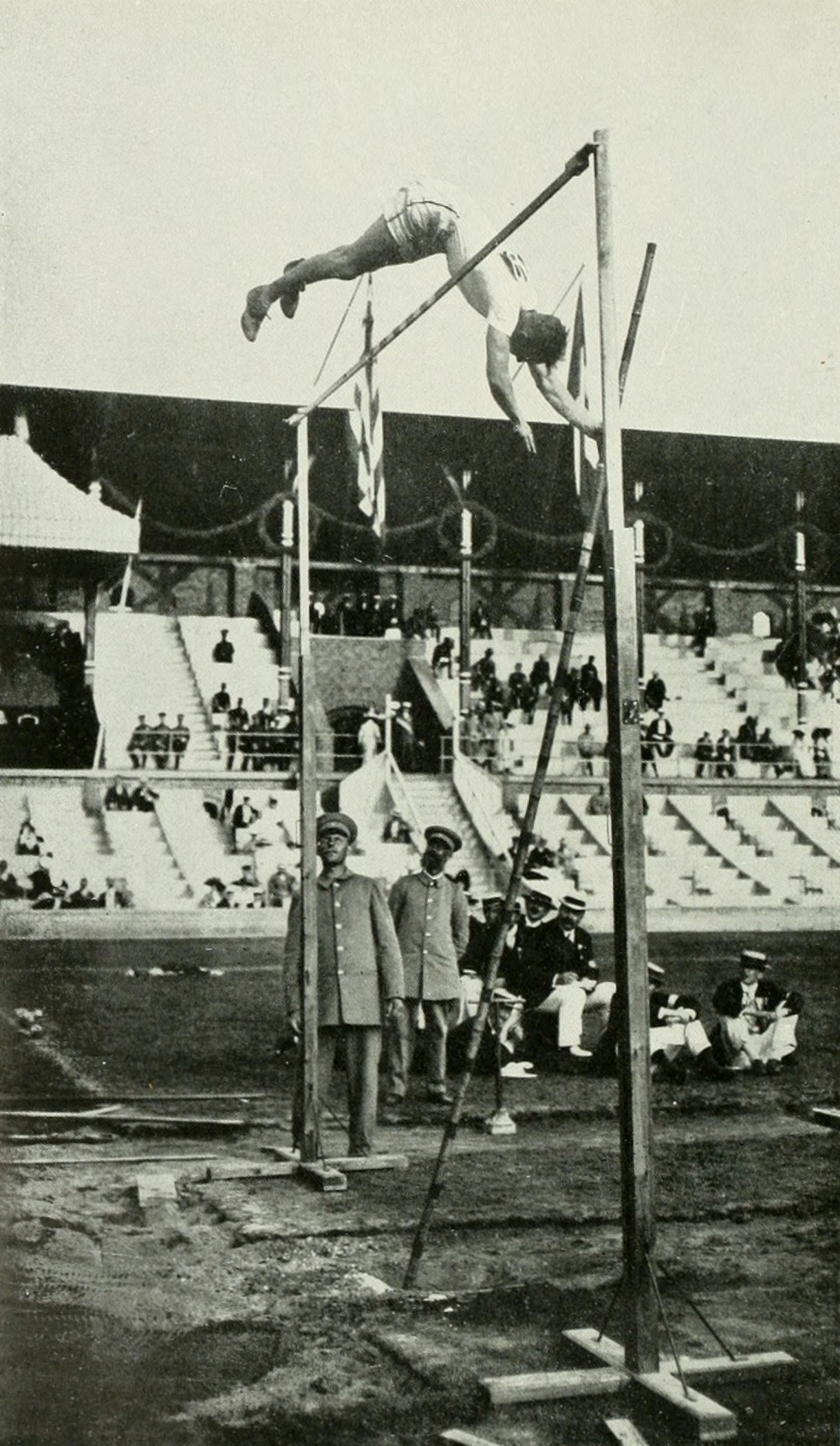
- Wright at the 1912 Summer Olympics

Medal record

Men's athletics

Representing the United States

Olympic Games
Silver medal – second place	1912 Stockholm	Pole vault

Marcus Snowell Wright (April 21, 1890 – August 5, 1975) was an American athlete who competed mainly in the pole vault. He was born in Chicago and died in Reading, Massachusetts.

Wright competed for the United States in the 1912 Summer Olympics held in Stockholm, Sweden, in the pole vault. He won the silver medal with a clearance of 3.85 m behind the 3.95 m of the winner Harry Babcock.

Wright graduated from Dartmouth College in 1913.

== Records ==
Marc Wright is the first man to clear 4.00 m in pole vaulting, he is also the first world record holder in the discipline.

Records
Preceded by Incumbent	Men's Pole Vault World Record Holder; June 8, 1912 – August 20, 1920	Succeeded by (United States) Frank Foss
