= Jakab Kauser =

Hungarian pole vaulter

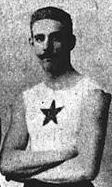

Personal information
- Born: 22 March 1878 in Budapest, Hungary
- Died: 27 June 1925 (aged 47) Budapest, Hungary

Sport
- Sport: Athletics
- Event: Pole vault
- Club: MAC Budapest

Fülöp Jakab "Kóbi" Kauser (22 March 1878 in Budapest – 27 June 1925 in Budapest) was a Hungarian track and field athlete who competed at the 1900 Summer Olympics in Paris.

== Biography ==
Kauser represented Hungary at the 1900 Summer Olympics, participating in the pole vault competition and finished fourth.

Two years later, Kauser won the AAA Championships pole jump title at the 1902 AAA Championships.
