= Meredith Colket =

American athlete (1878–1947)

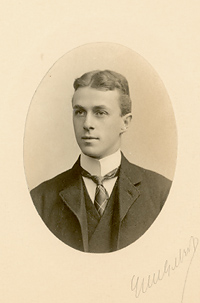

Personal information
- Born: November 19, 1878 Philadelphia, USA
- Died: June 7, 1947 (aged 68) Bryn Mawr, Pennsylvania, USA

Sport
- Sport: Athletics
- Event: pole vault
- Club: Penn Quakers, Philadelphia
Medal record
Men's athletics
Representing the United States
Olympic Games
Silver medal – second place	1900 Paris	Pole vault

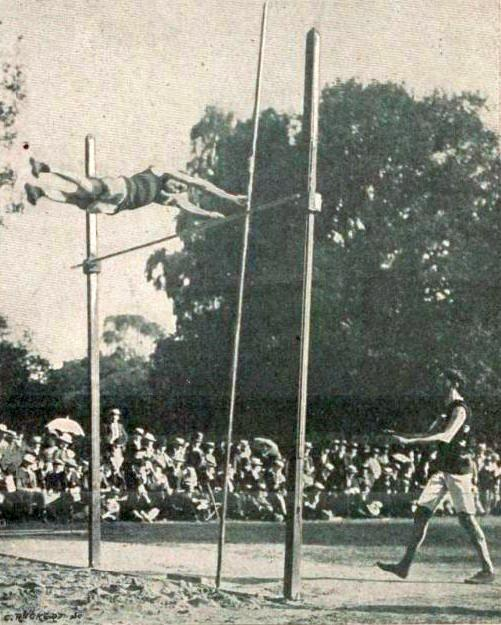
Meredith Colket competing in pole vault at the 1900 Summer Olympics

Meredith Bright Colket (November 19, 1878 – June 7, 1947) was an American pole vaulter who competed in the 1900 Summer Olympics in Paris and won the silver medal in the men's pole vault ahead of Norwegian Carl-Albert Andersen who won bronze. Irving Baxter won gold.

== Biography ==
Colket was born on November 19, 1878, in Philadelphia. He graduated from the University of Pennsylvania with a B.S. degree in 1901 and a LL.B degree in 1904. He was a member of Phi Gamma Delta and the varsity track team for all four of his undergraduate years. Colkert finished second in the pole jump at the British 1900 AAA Championships.

He organized the first tennis team at Penn and won second place at the intercollegiate tennis doubles championship in 1902. He worked as an attorney for the General Accident Fire & Life Insurance Corporation and continued to play tennis at the Merion Cricket Club. He married Alberta Kelsey on April 12, 1911, in London.

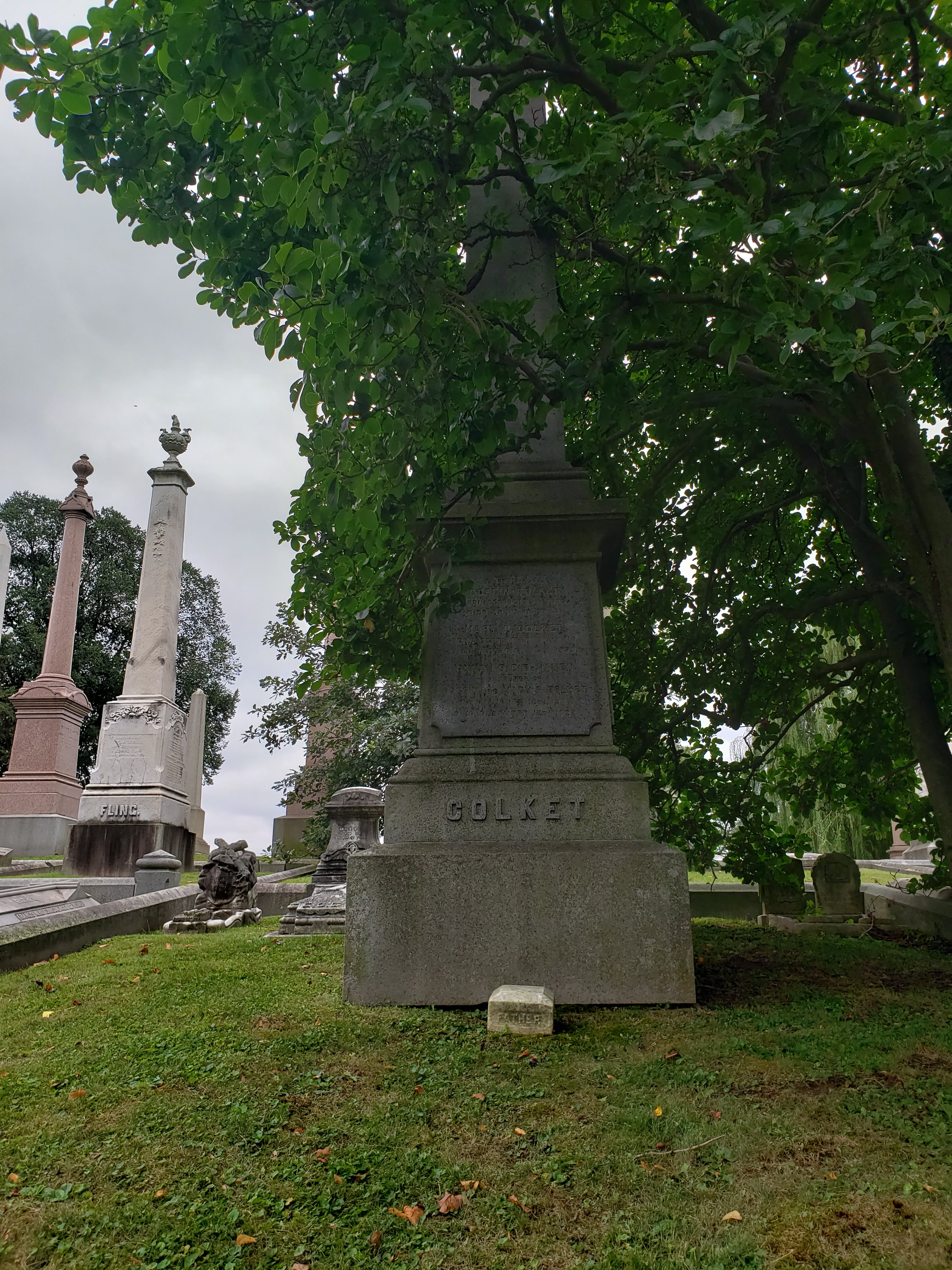
Meredith Colket gravesite in Laurel Hill Cemetery

He died of a heart attack at his home in Bryn Mawr, Pennsylvania, on June 7, 1947, and was interred at Laurel Hill Cemetery in Philadelphia.

Colket's son, Meredith B. Colket Jr. (1912–1985), was a noted genealogist.
