= Charles Dvorak =

American track and field athlete

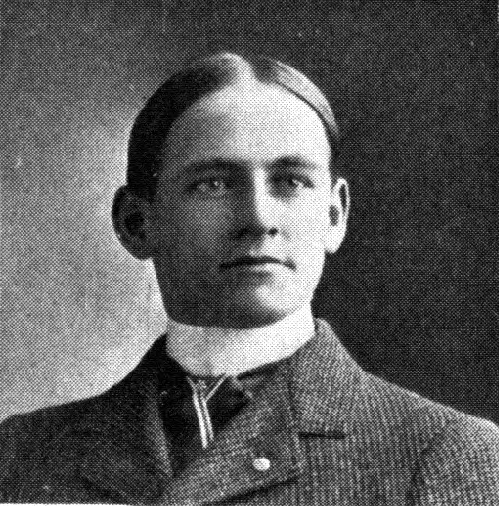
- Charles Dvorak from 1901 Michiganensian

Personal information
- Full name: Charles Edward Dvorak
- Born: November 27, 1878 Chicago, Illinois, U.S.
- Died: December 18, 1969 (aged 91) Seattle, Washington, U.S.

Sport
- Sport: Track and field
- Event: Pole vault
- College team: University of Michigan
- Club: Chicago Athletic Association
Medal record
Men's athletics
Representing the United States
Olympic Games
Silver medal – second place	1900 Paris	Pole vault (unofficial)
Gold medal – first place	1904 St. Louis	Pole vault

Charles Edward Dvorak (November 27, 1878 – December 18, 1969) was an American track and field athlete who specialized in the pole vault. He attended the University of Michigan where he competed for the Michigan Wolverines men's track and field team from 1900 to 1904. He participated in the 1900 Summer Olympics where he was a favorite in the pole vault. However, he missed the competition after being told by officials that the finals would be held on a Sunday. He won a special silver medal in a consolation competition. In 1903, he set a world's record in the pole vault with a jump of 11 feet, 11 inches.(This mark doesn't appear in the progression of World or American Records). Dvorak returned to international competition and won the gold medal in the pole vault at the 1904 Summer Olympics. Dvorak later served as a high school football, basketball and track coach in Seattle, Washington, where he died in 1969 at age 91.

== Early years ==
Dvorak was born in Chicago in 1878. He was the son of Frank E. and Antoinette (Hrdlicka) Dvorak. Dvorak attended the Lewis Institute in Chicago, considered the first junior college in the United States. The Encyclopedia of Ethnicity and Sports in the United States credits Dvorak as being one of the earliest Americans of Czech descent to achieve significant success in athletics.

== University of Michigan ==
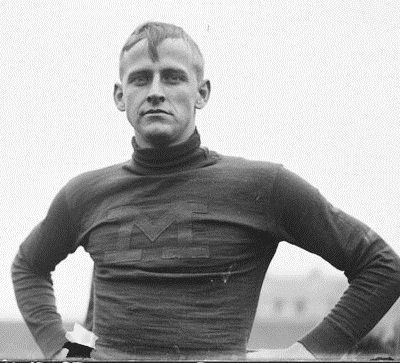
Dvorak competing for the University of Michigan in 1903.

In approximately 1898, Dvorak transferred to the University of Michigan as a junior in the Department of Literature, Science and Arts. While attending Michigan over the following six years, Dvorak was captain of the track team, vice-president of the Republican Club, athletic editor of the University of Michigan Daily, editor of the U. of M. Republican, and a member of the Comedy Club, the Board of Control, the Gymnasium Team, the Social Committee, the Fencing Club, and the Hawks.

Before enrolling at Michigan, Dvorak had competed in the pole vault, achieving a height of 9 feet, 6 inches. At Michigan, Dvorak worked with track coach Keene Fitzpatrick, who has been credited with inventing modern pole-vaulting technique. Fitzpatrick taught Dvorak to grasp the pole with his hands close together, resulting in a significant increase in the heights Dvorak was able to clear.

In 1901, Dvorak won the first Western Conference pole vault championship with a jump of 11 feet, 6 inches. After the 1901 season, Dvorak received his bachelor's degree as a member of the University of Michigan's literary class of 1901. He returned in the fall as a student in Michigan's law department, earning his law degree in 1904. Dvorak was a member of four consecutive Western Conference championship track teams from 1901 to 1904 and was the conference pole vault champion in both 1901 and 1903. He won the 1903 conference championship with a vault of 11 feet, 9 inches, breaking the intercollegiate record of 11 feet, 6-1/2 inches held by Chapman of Drake.

In May 1903, Dvorak set a world's record in the pole vault with a jump of 11 feet, 11 inches. He reportedly often cleared 12 feet in practice.

== 1900 Summer Olympics ==
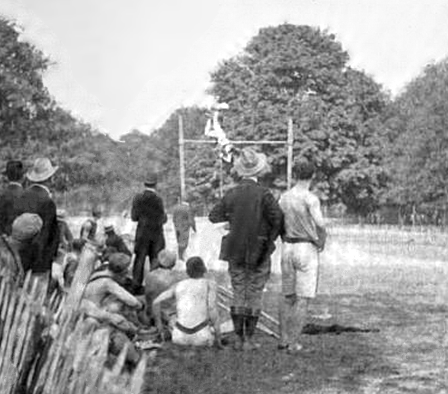
Dvorak "Clearing the Pole at 11 Feet 5 Inches" in 1900 (photo by George A. Draper).

In 1900, funds were solicited from faculty, students, alumni and Ann Arbor businessmen to send Dvorak, three other Michigan track athletes, and Coach Fitzpatrick to the 1900 Summer Olympics in Paris. In Paris, Dvorak missed the event finals following a controversy over the scheduling of certain event finals for a Sunday. Several American athletes agreed they would not violate Sabbath. The pole vault, in which Dvorak was a favorite, was one of the events scheduled for Sunday. Two of the Americans (Dvorak and Bascom Johnson) nevertheless went to the Racing Club grounds where the event was to be held. They were told not to worry, that the event had been rescheduled. The officials later changed their decision, and the event was held after Dvorak and Johnson had left. Irving Baxter won the competition with a jump of 10 feet, 10 inches. Because of the confusion, a special, albeit unofficial, competition was arranged for the athletes who had not participated in the Sunday event. Dvorak took the silver medal in the special competition with a jump of 11 feet, 1-3/4 inches.

On his return from Paris, Fitzpatrick praised the American athletes and criticized Paris officials for holding key event finals on a Sunday: "The Americans showed themselves superior in every kind of track athletics. They won practically everything. We felt keenly the breach of faith in holding the Paris games on Sunday, but we could do nothing more than make a formal protest."

An entirely different account of Dvorak's disqualification was published in October 1900 by The Michigan Alumnus. According to the latter account, Dvorak's "form in vaulting had been a revelation to the Frenchmen. Each day cries of 'Bravo! Bravo!' could be heard as Charlie swung over an eleven foot jump with the greatest ease." However, on the day of the finals, Dvorak and the Princeton vaulters chose not to cross the patch where the 100 meters run was occurring and therefore did not arrive at the standards until the other contestants had made their first trial jump. According to this account, Dvorak and the Princeton vaulters were not allowed to participate due to their late arrival.

== Use of bamboo pole ==
Dvorak is also known as the first pole vaulter to use a bamboo pole in lieu of the traditional, heavier ash or hickory poles. He first used a bamboo pole at the 1900 Summer Olympics. The hickory pole he had brought with him from Ann Arbor broke on a practice vault. One observer recalled, "we heard a ripping, tearing noise, and looking around saw him lying on the ground beside his pole, which was broken and useless." In spite of the "severe jarring" received in the fall, Dvorak borrowed a light bamboo pole from a Danish competitor and used it to complete his participation in the consolation event. Dvorak's coach, Keene Fitzpatrick, opined that Dvorak would have been able to reach a height close to 12 feet if he had not been forced to jump with a new, unfamiliar pole. Dvorak worked with a bamboo pole for approximately a year from 1902 to 1903, though he discarded the bamboo pole for his old pole when he broke the world's record in May 1903.

In 1963, Dvorak, at age 84, was interviewed by Life magazine about the controversy over the introduction that year of fiberglass poles. Dvorak shared his recollection about murmurs that were exchanged when the bamboo pole was introduced. With respect to the use of fiberglass poles, he stated that he "doesn't know what all the hollering is about."

== 1904 Summer Olympics ==
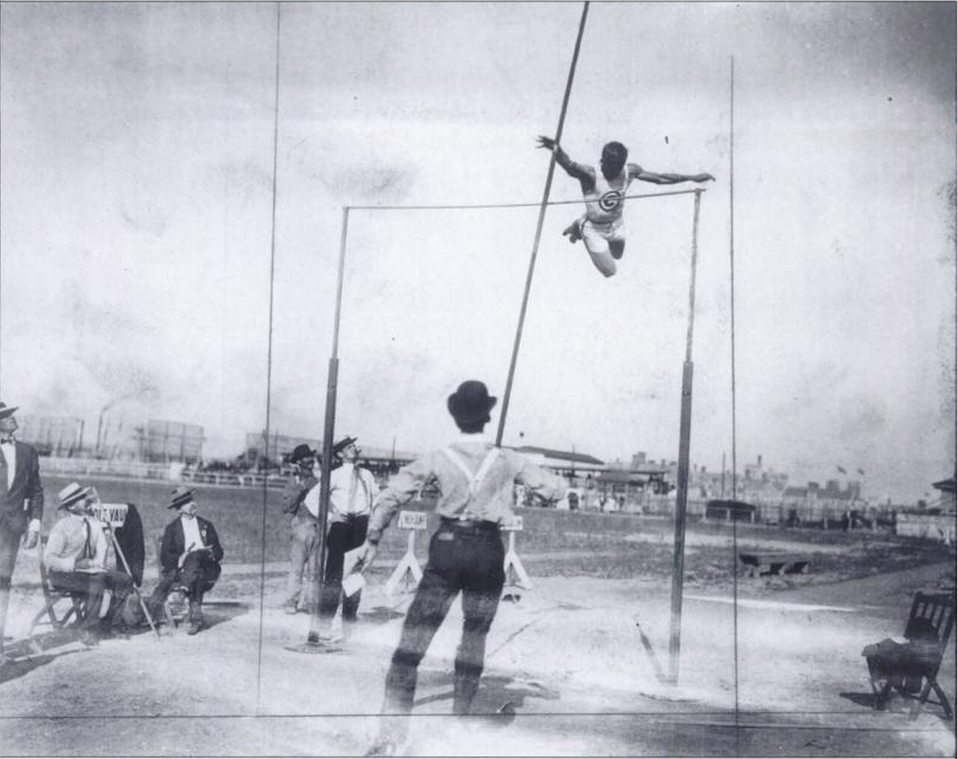
Dvorak competing at the 1904 Summer Olympics in St. Louis (Missouri Historical Society photograph)

Dvorak returned to international competition as a member of the United States Olympic team at the 1904 Summer Olympics in St. Louis. While no other vaulter jumped higher than 11 feet, Dvorak won the gold medal with a jump of 11 feet, 6 inches on September 3, 1904—the final day of competition in the St. Louis games. The vault set a new Olympic record, and was described in a press account as follows:

There was an unusually fine field in the pole vault contest. Five men broke the Olympic record before the event narrowed down to the final jumps, with three men eligible. Charles E. Dvorak of the C.A.A. then demonstrated his class, and from the 11-foot mark he competed alone, the other four men being tied at that mark. Dvorak's best was 11 feet 6 inches breaking the Olympic record of 10 feet 9-9/10 inches held by I. K. Baxter of the University of Pennsylvania, set at the Paris Olympiad.

== Coaching, farming and legal career ==
After retiring from athletic competition, Dvorak worked over the next 35 years as a lawyer, apple farmer, civil servant, athletic coach and teacher.

=== Armour Institute and Chicago law practice ===
In 1905, he was hired to coach the Armour Institute track team in Chicago. He also established a law office in Chicago at the Chamber of Commerce Building at 140 Washington Street.

=== University of Idaho ===
In January 1908, Dvorak was hired as the athletic director and track coach at the University of Idaho in Moscow, Idaho. At the time of his hiring, a wire service report noted, "Dvorak probably is better fitted for the position than any other available man in the northwest. He is an all-round athlete, has been connected with track for many years, and is thoroughly in touch with the game."

=== Legal and farming positions in Washington ===
Dvorak spent the months of August and September 1908 in the Big Horn Mountains of Wyoming. He had previously announced plans to spend the summer prospecting with an old miner. In the fall of 1908, he moved to Spokane, Washington.

In 1910, Dvorak was employed in helping to organize the Union Title and Trust Company of Okanogan County, Washington. He was placed in charge of the company's legal and trust work.

In 1912, Dvorak moved from Molson, Washington, to Marcus, Washington. From at least 1913 to 1914, he was also the proprietor of Sunny Slope Farm, an apple raising business at Bossburg, Washington.

From at least 1914 to 1917, he was the Chief Deputy Assessor of Stevens County, Washington, at Colville, in the northeastern part of the state.

In February 1918, Dvorak and his wife had a son, Robert Larry Dvorak (1918–1986), who was born in Spirit Lake, Idaho.

=== Franklin High School (Seattle) ===
In 1920, Dvorak moved to Seattle, Washington, where he was hired as the coach of all athletic teams at Franklin High School. He was the football coach at Franklin in 1920 and 1921. At Franklin, Dvorak coached African-American athlete Brice Taylor, who went on to become an All-American football player at the University of Southern California. A report on Dvorak in December 1921 noted: "He is coaching the Franklin High School football team and is very much of a success at it. He is very much admired by pupils and associates."

=== Roosevelt High School (Seattle) ===
By 1925, Dvorak had moved from Franklin High School to Roosevelt High School in Seattle, where he served for many years as the football, basketball and track coach. The players coached by Dvorak at Roosevelt High include Washington State Cougars football great Harry Speidel. In 1927, Spalding's Official Pacific Coast Interscholastic Foot Ball Guide reported that "Charles Dvorak, the renowned player of former years on Yost's University of Michigan team," was coach at Roosevelt High School. Dvorak compiled an overall record of 42-27-18 in 15 years as a high school football coach. In 1934, Dvorak retired from coaching football to devote his time to basketball and track. Later reports in 1937 and 1941 indicated that he was still a teacher and coach at Roosevelt High School.

== Death and posthumous honors ==
Dvorak died in 1969 at age 91. His last place of residence was in Seattle.

In 2008, Dvorak was posthumously inducted into the Michigan Track and Field Hall of Fame.
