= Bertil Uggla =

Swedish athlete

- Bertil Uggla as colonel.

Personal information
- Born: 19 August 1890 Solna, Sweden
- Died: 29 September 1945 (aged 55) Karlstad, Sweden

Sport
- Sport: Modern pentathlon, fencing, athletics
- Club: IFK Stockholm; FFF, Stockholm; I1 IF, Stockholm

Achievements and titles
- Personal bests: Pole vault – 3.82 m (1912); Decathlon – 6681 (1915)
Medal record
Representing Sweden
Olympic Games
Bronze medal – third place	1912 Stockholm	Pole vault
Bronze medal – third place	1924 Paris	Modern pentathlon
World Championships
Silver medal – second place	1935 Lousanne	Épée, team
Bronze medal – third place	1934 Warsaw	Épée, team

Bertil Gustafsson Uggla (19 August 1890 – 29 September 1945) was a Swedish officer, track and field athlete, modern pentathlete, and fencer.

== Early life ==
Uggla was born on 19 August 1890 at Karlberg Palace, Stockholm, Sweden, the son of General Gustaf Uggla (1846–1924) and his wife Augusta von Post (1851–1921). He had nine siblings: Carl Gustafsson (born 1875); Louise (born 1877); Eva Thurinna (born 1879); Gustaf Gustafsson (born 1880); Elsa (born 1882); Signe (born 1883); Axel (born 1888); Thorsten Gustafsson (born 1892) and Bengt Gustafsson (born 1894).

== Career ==
=== Military career ===
He was commissioned as an officer in the Svea Life Guards in 1910 with the rank of underlöjtnant. Uggla became a lieutenant in 1913, received an upper secondary school teacher's degree in 1915 and was a teacher at the Military Academy Karlberg from 1916 to 1918 and studied at the École normale militaire d’éducation physique in Joinville-le-Pont, France from 1919 to 1920. He attended the Royal Swedish Army Staff College from 1920 to 1922, served as an aspirant in the General Staff in 1924 to 1926 and was promoted to captain in 1925. Uggla was then a teacher at the Military Academy Karlberg from 1926 to 1934, and he was promoted to major in 1933. Uggla served as a major in Norrbotten Regiment in 1934 and in the General Staff in 1935. He became lieutenant colonel in the General Staff in 1937 and in the Life Grenadier Regiment in 1937. He then served as acting commanding officer of Göta Life Guards in 1938 and was promoted to colonel in 1939. He was commanding officer of the Military Academy Karlberg from 1940 to 1944 and served as Deputy Military Commander of the III Military District in 1944.

=== Sports career ===
He competed in track and field, modern pentathlon, and épée and foil fencing at the 1912, 1920, 1924 and 1928 Summer Olympics and won two bronze medals: in the pole vault in 1912 and in the modern pentathlon in 1924. The 1912 pole vaulting competition was unusual in that two silver and three bronze medals were given to athletes who cleared equal heights. Uggla was awarded Stora Grabbars Märke in 1928.

=== Civil career ===
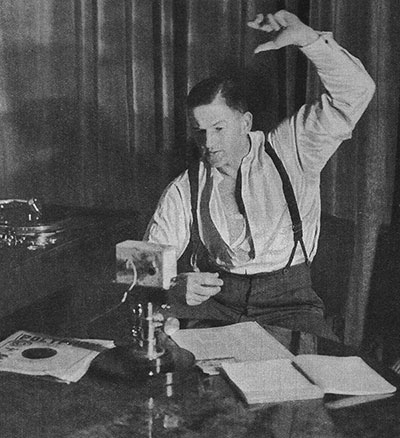
Uggla broadcasting his morning gymnastics program.

Uggla belonged to the board of several military sports associations (mainly Svea Life Guards), was in gymnastics the leader of the winning squad at the 1920 Olympics, for Gymno's elite squad from 1923 to 1927 and in 1929-1945 led the morning gymnastics on radio, to which he took the initiative. He was secretary in the Swedish Gymnastic Association (Svenska Gymnastikförbundet) from 1920 to 1926 and in the Swedish Fencing Association (Svenska Fäktförbundet) from 1925 to 1928, belonged to the executive board of the Royal Central Gymnastics Institute from 1932 to 1934 and was appointed its chief in 1945. He organized the military Physical Training School (Gymnastik- och idrottsskolan, GIS) in 1936 and commanded the same from 1941 to 1944.

Uggla was also chairman of the executive committee of the Swedish Military Sports Association (Sveriges Militära Idrottsförbund) from 1940 to 1944, chairman of the Stockholm district's executive committee from 1931 to 1934 and of the Boden district from 1934 to 1937. From 1928 until his death he was a member of the Swedish Olympic Committee, since 1926 a board member of the Central Association (chairman of its Working Committee since 1939), the Central Association's representative in the Swedish Sports Confederation's Central Board since 1931 (deputy from 1927 to 1930), since 1940 chairman of the Central Committee of the Field Sports' Working Committee and supervisor of its field sports leadership courses and from 1943 chairman of the Gymnastics and Sports Museum Board (Gymnastik- och Idrottsmuseinämnden).

== Personal life ==
In 1918, he married Karin Hammarskiöld (born 1897), the daughter of Lieutenant General Ludvig Hammarskiöld and Gerda Neijber. He was the father of Bengt B:son Uggla (born 1920).

== Death ==
Colonel Uggla died on 29 September 1945 while preparing for an eventing competition in a forest outside Karlstad. Uggla suffered a heart attack during a walk outside Karlstad. When he was found, he was still alive but died later that evening at Karlstad Hospital, where he was taken by ambulance.

== Dates of rank ==
- 1910 – Underlöjtnant
- 1913 – Lieutenant
- 1925 – Captain
- 1933 – Major
- 1937 – Lieutenant colonel
- 1939 – Colonel

== Awards and decorations ==
- (Sweden) Swedish Fencing Federation Royal Medal of Merit in gold (Svenska fäktförbundets kungliga förtjänstmedalj i guld) (1940)
