= William Halpenny =

Canadian pole vaulter (1882–1960)

Medal record

Men's athletics

Representing Canada

Olympic Games
Bronze medal – third place	1912 Stockholm	Pole vault

William Halpenny (May 23, 1882 – February 10, 1960) was a Canadian track and field athlete who competed in the 1912 Summer Olympics. He was born in Prince Edward Island. In 1912, he won a bronze medal in the pole vault event.
