= Harry Babcock (pole vaulter) =

American pole vaulter (1890–1965)

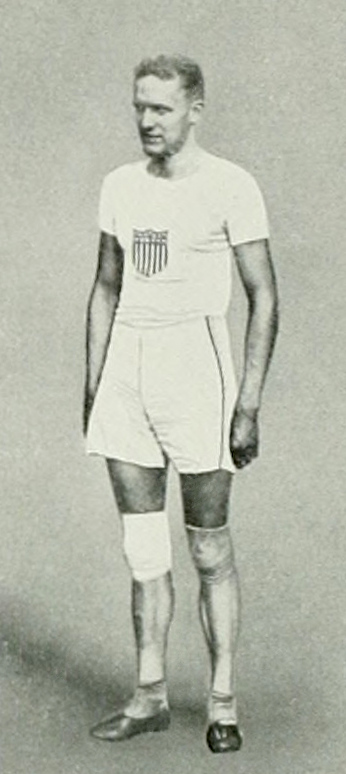
- Babcock at the 1912 Summer Olympics

Personal information
- Born: December 15, 1890 Pelham Manor, New York, United States
- Died: June 5, 1965 (aged 74) Norwalk, Connecticut, United States
- Height: 1.88 m (6 ft 2 in)
- Weight: 75 kg (165 lb)

Sport
- Sport: Pole vault
- Club: NYAC, New York
Medal record
Representing the United States
Olympic Games
Gold medal – first place	1912 Stockholm	Pole vault

Henry Stoddard Babcock (December 15, 1890 – June 5, 1965) was an American pole vaulter who won the gold medal at the 1912 Summer Olympics, setting an Olympic record at 3.95 meters.

Babcock started as a long jumper and, only around 1910, changed to the pole vault. He graduated in engineering from Columbia University in 1912 and later worked as a salesman with a lumber company in Irvington, New York.
