= Fernand Gonder =

French pole vaulter (1883–1969)

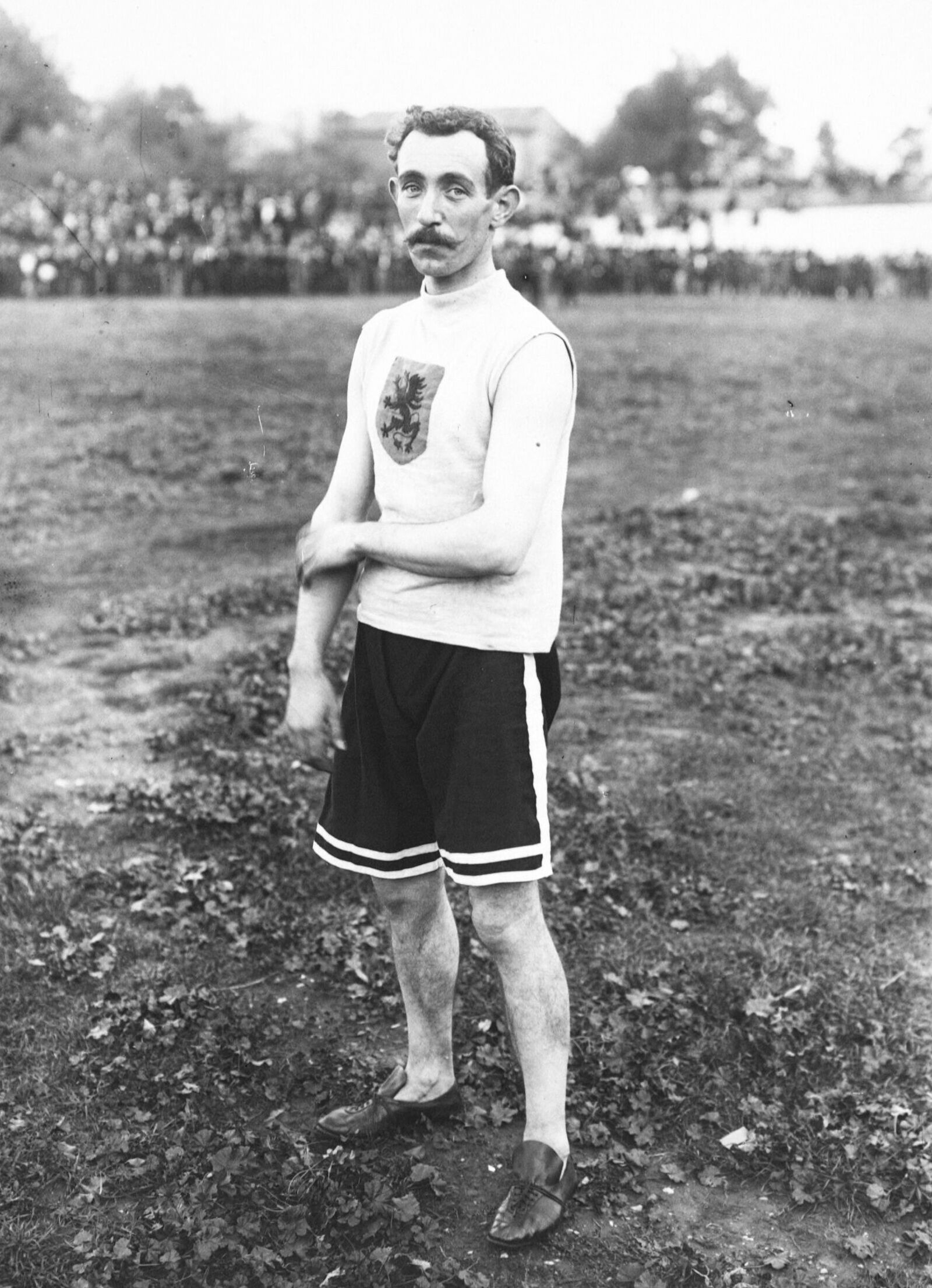
- Gonder in 1911

Personal information
- Born: 12 June 1883 Bordeaux, France
- Died: 10 March 1969 (aged 85) Tonnay-Charente, France
- Height: 170 cm (5 ft 7 in)
- Weight: 65 kg (143 lb)

Sport
- Sport: Athletics
- Events: Pole vault, long jump
- Club: SA Bordeaux (1904–1906 and 1914); FC Talence (1907–1912); CA Bègles (1913)

Achievements and titles
- Personal bests: PV – 3.83 m (1905); LJ – 6.54 m (1907)
Medal record
Representing France
Intercalated Games
Gold medal – first place	1906 Athens	Pole vault

Fernand Gonder (12 June 1883 – 10 March 1969) was a French pole vaulter who won the gold medal at the 1906 Intercalated Games.

== Career ==
Gonder was selected to represent France at the 1906 Olympic Games and won gold in the pole jump event. Four years later at the 1912 Summer Olympics he finished 15th in the same event.

Gonder was the French champion in 1904, 1905, 1913 and 1914, finishing second in 1912. Gonder also won the British AAA Championships title in the pole jump event at the 1905 AAA Championships. He returned in 1913 to claim third place behind Swedes Clas Gille and Carl Hårleman at the 1913 AAA Championships.
