= 1971 European Athletics Championships – Men's 3000 metres steeplechase =

Men's 3000 metres steeplechase at the European Athletics Championships

The men's 3000 metres steeplechase at the 1971 European Athletics Championships was held in Helsinki, Finland, at Helsinki Olympic Stadium on 13 and 15 August 1971.

== Medalists ==
Gold	Jean-Paul Villain; France
Silver	Dušan Moravčík; Czechoslovakia
Bronze	Pavel Sysoev Yakovlevich; Soviet Union

== Results ==
=== Final ===
15 August

Rank	Name	Nationality	Time	Notes
1st place, gold medalist(s)	Jean-Paul Villain	France	8:25.12	NR
2nd place, silver medalist(s)	Dušan Moravčík	Czechoslovakia	8:26.11	NR
3rd place, bronze medalist(s)	Pavel Sysoyev	Soviet Union	8:26.42	
4	Romualdas Bitė	Soviet Union	8:26.97	
5	Mikko Ala-Leppilampi	Finland	8:30.94	
6	Georgi Tikhov	Bulgaria	8:32.15	
7	Kazimierz Maranda	Poland	8:33.05	
8	Józef Rębacz	Poland	8:35.12	
9	Vladimiras Dudinas	Soviet Union	8:38.96	
10	Anders Gärderud	Sweden	8:39.58	
11	Pekka Päivärinta	Finland	8:55.34	
	Toni Feldmann	Switzerland	DNF	

=== Heats ===
13 August

==== Heat 1 ====
Rank	Name	Nationality	Time	Notes
1	Pavel Sysoyev	Soviet Union	8:29.65	Q
2	Toni Feldmann	Switzerland	8:29.75	NR Q
3	Georgi Tikhov	Bulgaria	8:30.87	Q
4	Józef Rębacz	Poland	8:33.36	Q
5	Tapio Kantanen	Finland	8:35.88	
6	Umberto Risi	Italy	8:37.15	
7	Spyros Kontossoros	Greece	8:38.24	NR
8	Paul Thys	Belgium	8:41.11	
9	Willi Wagner	West Germany	8:44.50	
10	Ståle Engen	Norway	8:44.68	
11	Gérard Delalandre	France	8:54.70	
12	Ron McAndrew	Great Britain	9:02.11	

==== Heat 2 ====
Rank	Name	Nationality	Time	Notes
1	Dušan Moravčík	Czechoslovakia	8:32.81	Q
2	Pekka Päivärinta	Finland	8:33.34	Q
3	Jean-Paul Villain	France	8:34.17	Q
4	Romualdas Bitė	Soviet Union	8:34.28	Q
5	Arne Risa	Norway	8:35.62	
6	Henryk Lesiuk	Poland	8:40.34	
7	Gheorghe Cefan	Romania	8:44.34	
8	Hans-Dieter Schulten	West Germany	8:46.98	
9	Carlos Lopes	Portugal	8:54.83	
10	Francesco Valente	Italy	8:57.93	
11	Hans Menet	Switzerland	8:58.27	

==== Heat 3 ====
Rank	Name	Nationality	Time	Notes
1	Anders Gärderud	Sweden	8:28.32	NR Q
2	Mikko Ala-Leppilampi	Finland	8:28.96	Q
3	Vladimiras Dudinas	Soviet Union	8:30.30	Q
4	Kazimierz Maranda	Poland	8:31.85	Q
5	Sverre Sørnes	Norway	8:35.24	
6	Andy Holden	Great Britain	8:36.11	
7	Wigmar Petersen	Denmark	8:36.67	NR
8	Gérard Buchheit	France	8:40.07	
9	Mikhail Zhelev	Bulgaria	8:50.64	
10	Milan Tomić	Yugoslavia	8:53.31	

== Participation ==
According to an unofficial count, 33 athletes from 18 countries participated in the event.

- Belgium (1)
- Bulgaria (2)
- Czechoslovakia (1)
- Denmark (1)
- Finland (3)
- France (3)
- Greece (1)
- Italy (2)
- Norway (3)
- Poland (3)
- Portugal (1)
- Romania (1)
- Soviet Union (3)
- Sweden (1)
- Switzerland (2)
- Great Britain (2)
- West Germany (2)
- Yugoslavia (1)
