= 1974 European Athletics Championships – Men's 3000 metres steeplechase =

Men's 3000 metres steeplechase at the European Athletics Championships

The men's 3000 metres steeplechase at the 1974 European Athletics Championships was held in Rome, Italy, at Stadio Olimpico on 4 and 7 September 1974.

== Medalists ==
| Gold | Bronisław Malinowski; Poland |
| Silver | Anders Gärderud; Sweden |
| Bronze | Michael Karst; West Germany |

== Results ==
=== Final ===
7 September

| Rank | Name | Nationality | Time | Notes |
|---|---|---|---|---|
| 1st place, gold medalist(s) | Bronisław Malinowski | Poland | 8:15.04 | CR NR |
| 2nd place, silver medalist(s) | Anders Gärderud | Sweden | 8:15.41 | |
| 3rd place, bronze medalist(s) | Michael Karst | West Germany | 8:17.91 | NR |
| 4 | Franco Fava | Italy | 8:18.85 | NR |
| 5 | Hanspeter Wehrli | Switzerland | 8:26.13 | |
| 6 | Gheorghe Cefan | Romania | 8:26.19 | |
| 7 | Gerd Frähmcke | West Germany | 8:26.53 | |
| 8 | Gérard Buchheit | France | 8:30.2 | |
| 9 | Dan Glans | Sweden | 8:31.4 | |
| 10 | Dušan Moravčík | Czechoslovakia | 8:34.4 | |
| 11 | Tapio Kantanen | Finland | 8:43.2 | |
| 12 | František Bartoš | Czechoslovakia | 8:49.6 | |

=== Heats ===
4 September

==== Heat 1 ====
| Rank | Name | Nationality | Time | Notes |
|---|---|---|---|---|
| 1 | Franco Fava | Italy | 8:25.07 | Q |
| 2 | Michael Karst | West Germany | 8:26.4 | Q |
| 3 | Dan Glans | Sweden | 8:28.0 | Q |
| 4 | Paul Thys | Belgium | 8:34.2 | |
| 5 | Jean-Paul Villain | France | 8:45.0 | |
| 6 | John Bicourt | Great Britain | 8:52.4 | |
| 7 | Arne Risa | Norway | 8:58.8 | |
| | Karl-Åge Søltoft | Denmark | DNF | |

==== Heat 2 ====
| Rank | Name | Nationality | Time | Notes |
|---|---|---|---|---|
| 1 | Bronisław Malinowski | Poland | 8:23.60 | CR Q |
| 2 | Tapio Kantanen | Finland | 8:23.6 | Q |
| 3 | František Bartoš | Czechoslovakia | 8:32.0 | Q |
| 4 | John Davies | Great Britain | 8:36.0 | |
| 5 | Sverre Sørnes | Norway | 8:44.2 | |
| 6 | Herbert Leyens | Belgium | 8:45.4 | |
| 7 | Patrick Martin | France | 8:46.8 | |
| 8 | Eddy Leddy | Ireland | 9:04.6 | |

==== Heat 3 ====
| Rank | Name | Nationality | Time | Notes |
|---|---|---|---|---|
| 1 | Anders Gärderud | Sweden | 8:23.62 | CR Q |
| 2 | Gheorghe Cefan | Romania | 8:25.80 | NR Q |
| 3 | Hanspeter Wehrli | Switzerland | 8:26.00 | NR Q |
| 4 | Gerd Frähmcke | West Germany | 8:26.80 | q |
| 5 | Dušan Moravčík | Czechoslovakia | 8:28.00 | q |
| 6 | Gérard Buchheit | France | 8:31.00 | q |
| 7 | Antonio Campos | Spain | 8:38.20 | |
| 8 | David Camp | Great Britain | 8:44.40 | |
| | Jan Voje | Norway | DNS | |

== Participation ==
According to an unofficial count, 24 athletes from 15 countries participated in the event.

- Belgium (2)
- Czechoslovakia (2)
- Denmark (1)
- Finland (1)
- France (3)
- Ireland (1)
- Italy (1)
- Norway (2)
- Poland (1)
- Romania (1)
- Spain (1)
- Sweden (2)
- Switzerland (1)
- Great Britain (3)
- West Germany (2)
