= Athletics at the 1972 Summer Olympics – Men's 3000 metres steeplechase =

Men's 3000 metres steeplechase at the Games of the XX Olympiad
- Venue: Olympic Stadium, Munich, West Germany
- Date: 1 and 4 September 1972
- Competitors: 49 from 29 nations
- Winning time: 8:23.6 OR

Medalists
1st place, gold medalist(s)		Kipchoge Keino; Kenya
2nd place, silver medalist(s)		Ben Jipcho; Kenya
3rd place, bronze medalist(s)		Tapio Kantanen; Finland

These are the official results of the men's 3000 metres steeplechase event at the 1972 Summer Olympics in Munich. The competition was held on 1 and 4 September.

== Heats ==
The top three runners in each of the four heats (blue), advanced to the final round.

=== Heat one ===
Rank	Name	Nationality	Time	Notes
1	Tapio Kantanen	Finland	8:24.8	OR
2	Kip Keino	Kenya	8:27.6	
3	Takaharu Koyama	Japan	8:29.8	
4	Gheorghe Cefan	Romania	8:33.8	
5	Andy Holden	Great Britain	8:33.8	
6	Toni Feldmann	Switzerland	8:35.8	
7	Steve Savage	United States	8:39.0	
8	Gérard Buchheit	France	8:41.2	
9	Filbert Bayi	Tanzania	8:41.4	
10	Vitus Ashaba	Uganda	8:45.0	
11	Tadeusz Zieliński	Poland	8:49.8	
12	Wigmar Pedersen	Denmark	9:03.0	

=== Heat two ===
Rank	Name	Nationality	Time
1	Ben Jipcho	Kenya	8:31.6
2	Mikko Ala-Leppilampi	Finland	8:31.8
3	Mikhail Zhelev	Bulgaria	8:35.8
4	Willi Maier	West Germany	8:37.6
5	Akira Takeuchi	Japan	8:40.4
6	Sergey Skripka	Soviet Union	8:41.4
7	Jan Voje	Norway	8:42.0
8	Hans Menet	Switzerland	8:45.4
9	Eddie Leddy	Ireland	8:47.4
10	Kazimierz Maranda	Poland	8:50.4
11	Esau Adenji	Cameroon	9:34.4
12	Kerry O'Brien	Australia	DNF

=== Heat three ===
Rank	Name	Nationality	Time
1	Pekka Päivärinta	Finland	8:29.0
2	Romualdas Bitė	Soviet Union	8:30.2
3	Jean-Paul Villain	France	8:30.4
4	Josef Horčic	Czechoslovakia	8:30.6
5	Anders Gärderud	Sweden	8:30.8
6	Willi Wagner	West Germany	8:34.0
7	Paul Thijs	Belgium	8:35.0
8	John Bicourt	Great Britain	8:38.8
9	Doug Brown	United States	8:41.2
10	Panagiotis Nakopoulos	Greece	8:48.4
11	Yohannes Mohamed	Ethiopia	8:52.6
12	Robert Hackman	Ghana	8:57.6

=== Heat four ===
Rank	Name	Nationality	Time	Notes
1	Amos Biwott	Kenya	8:23.8	OR
2	Bronisław Malinowski	Poland	8:28.2	
3	Dušan Moravčík	Czechoslovakia	8:33.4	
4	Steve Hollings	Great Britain	8:35.0	
5	Franco Fava	Italy	8:35.0	
6	Hans-Dieter Schulten	West Germany	8:39.8	
7	Boualem Rahoui	Algeria	8:41.0	
8	Spyridon Kontosoros	Greece	8:41.0	
9	Georges Kaiser	Switzerland	8:45.4	
10	Mike Manley	United States	8:50.4	
11	Sverre Sørnes	Norway	8:54.8	
12	Usaia Sotutu	Fiji	9:12.0	
13	Julio Quevedo	Guatemala	9:28.4	

== Final ==
Rank	Name	Nationality	Time	Notes
1st place, gold medalist(s)	Kip Keino	Kenya	8:23.6	OR
2nd place, silver medalist(s)	Ben Jipcho	Kenya	8:24.6	
3rd place, bronze medalist(s)	Tapio Kantanen	Finland	8:24.8	
4	Bronisław Malinowski	Poland	8:28.0	
5	Dušan Moravčík	Czechoslovakia	8:29.2	
6	Amos Biwott	Kenya	8:33.6	
7	Romualdas Bitė	Soviet Union	8:34.6	
8	Pekka Päivärinta	Finland	8:37.2	
9	Takaharu Koyama	Japan	8:37.8	
10	Mikko Ala-Leppilampi	Finland	8:41.0	
11	Jean-Paul Villain	France	8:46.8	
12	Mikhail Zhelev	Bulgaria	9:02.6	
