= 1969 European Athletics Championships – Men's 3000 metres steeplechase =

Men's 3000 metres steeplechase at the European Athletics Championships

The men's 3000 metres steeplechase at the 1969 European Athletics Championships was held in Athens, Greece, at Georgios Karaiskakis Stadium on 18 and 20 September 1969.

== Medalists ==
| Gold | Mikhail Zhelev; Bulgaria |
| Silver | Aleksandr Morozov; Soviet Union |
| Bronze | Vladimiras Dudinas; Soviet Union |

== Results ==
=== Final ===
20 September

| Rank | Name | Nationality | Time | Notes |
|---|---|---|---|---|
| 1st place, gold medalist(s) | Mikhail Zhelev | Bulgaria | 8:25.02 | CR NR |
| 2nd place, silver medalist(s) | Aleksandr Morozov | Soviet Union | 8:25.57 | |
| 3rd place, bronze medalist(s) | Vladimiras Dudinas | Soviet Union | 8:26.6 | |
| 4 | Georgi Tikhov | Bulgaria | 8:27.2 | |
| 5 | Jean-Paul Villain | France | 8:33.4 | |
| 6 | Arne Risa | Norway | 8:34.4 | |
| 7 | Kazimierz Maranda | Poland | 8:34.6 | |
| 8 | Gerry Stevens | Great Britain | 8:36.6 | |
| 9 | Jean-Pierre Ouine | France | 8:39.6 | |
| 10 | Wolfgang Luers | Poland | 8:46.6 | |
| 11 | Bengt Persson | Sweden | 8:56.1 | |
| 12 | Hans Menet | Switzerland | 9:02.6 | |

=== Heats ===
18 September

==== Heat 1 ====
| Rank | Name | Nationality | Time | Notes |
|---|---|---|---|---|
| 1 | Vladimiras Dudinas | Soviet Union | 8:43.8 | Q |
| 2 | Arne Risa | Norway | 8:44.0 | Q |
| 3 | Georgi Tikhov | Bulgaria | 8:44.4 | Q |
| 4 | Jean-Pierre Ouine | France | 8:44.5 | Q |
| 5 | Wolfgang Luers | Poland | 8:45.6 | Q |
| 6 | Hans Menet | Switzerland | 8:47.2 | Q |
| 7 | John Jackson | Great Britain | 8:48.4 | |
| 8 | Pavel Sysoyev | Soviet Union | 8:54.8 | |
| 9 | Eddy Van Butsele | Belgium | 9:04.6 | |
| 10 | Stanisław Śmitkowski | Poland | 9:07.4 | |

==== Heat 2 ====
| Rank | Name | Nationality | Time | Notes |
|---|---|---|---|---|
| 1 | Aleksandr Morozov | Soviet Union | 8:44.4 | Q |
| 2 | Gerry Stevens | Great Britain | 8:45.4 | Q |
| 3 | Mikhail Zhelev | Bulgaria | 8:45.6 | Q |
| 4 | Kazimierz Maranda | Poland | 8:48.0 | Q |
| 5 | Jean-Paul Villain | France | 8:50.0 | Q |
| 6 | Bengt Persson | Sweden | 8:51.0 | Q |
| 7 | Gheorghe Cefan | Romania | 8:58.2 | |
| 8 | Toni Feldmann | Switzerland | 9:01.2 | |
| 9 | Umberto Risi | Italy | 9:03.2 | |

== Participation ==
According to an unofficial count, 19 athletes from 11 countries participated in the event.

- Belgium (1)
- Bulgaria (2)
- France (2)
- Italy (1)
- Norway (1)
- Poland (3)
- Romania (1)
- Soviet Union (3)
- Sweden (1)
- Switzerland (2)
- Great Britain (2)
