= Athletics at the 1980 Summer Olympics – Men's 3000 metres steeplechase =

Men's 3000 metres steeplechase at the Games of the XXII Olympiad
- Olympic Athletics
- Venue: Lenin Stadium
- Dates: 26 July 1980 (qualifying); 28 July 1980 (semi-finals); 31 July 1980 (final)
- Competitors: 32 from 18 nations

Medalists
1st place, gold medalist(s)		Bronisław Malinowski	Poland
2nd place, silver medalist(s)		Filbert Bayi	Tanzania
3rd place, bronze medalist(s)		Eshetu Tura	Ethiopia

The men's 3,000 metres steeplechase event at the 1980 Summer Olympics took place from 26 to 31 July at the Lenin Stadium. A total of 32 athletes competed, with three qualifying heats (32 runners) and two semi-finals (24) before the final (12).

== Summary ==
As the previous Olympic final in Montreal had been in 1976, also this Olympic steeplechase final was quick from the start. In accordance with most pre-final expectations, Tanzania's Filbert Bayi sprinted to the lead soon after the start. With Ethiopia's Eshetu Tura and Spain's Francisco Sanchez following him, Bayi led the 12-man field through 1,000 metres in 2:38.4. During the second kilometre of this final, several runners gradually lost contact with the top steeplechasers. Already with four laps to go, Bayi had stretched his lead over Tura to 10 metres. With three laps to go, Bayi had expanded his lead to at least 20 metres. However, around that point, Poland's Bronislaw Malinowski moved into the third place. By the time Bayi passed 2,000 metres in 5:20.3, he started to tire out. His fatigue became visible with two laps to go, when he still held a 35-metre lead over Tura. As a result, he needed to stretch and strain his tired legs more and more, in order to jump over the barriers. By contrast, Malinowski kept jumping over the barriers smoothly and effortlessly. During the second-last lap, Malinowski passed Tura, and started to close in on Bayi. Although the Tanzanian was still around 20 metres ahead of the Pole at the start of the final lap, Bayi's speed had visibly slowed down. It was only a matter of time before Malinowski would catch and pass him. On the final bend, shortly before the last water barrier, Malinowski at last sprinted past the exhausted Bayi. The experienced Polish steeplechaser easily won the race, while Bayi was able to keep Tura behind himself. Spain's Domingo Ramon placed fourth, as this final's best Western European. (The Olympic Book of Moscow (The Runner Magazine), Helsinki, Finland, 1980; The Big Olympic Book (the 1980 edition), Helsinki, Finland; https://www.youtube.com/watch?v=8xbEsKKDyNQ.)

== Records ==
Prior to this competition, the existing world, and Olympic records were as follows.

World record	Henry Rono (KEN)	8:05.4	Seattle, United States	13 May 1978
Olympic record	Anders Gärderud (SWE)	8:08.02	Montreal, Canada	28 July 1976

The following national records were established during the competition:

Country	Athlete	Round	Time	Notes
Tanzania	Filbert Bayi (TAN)	Final	8:12.48	

== Schedule ==
The men's 3000 metres steeplechase took place over three separate days.

All times are Moscow Time (UTC+3)

Date	Time	Round
Saturday, 26 July 1980	18:20	Round 1
Monday, 28 July 1980	20:35	Semi-finals
Thursday, 31 July 1980	19:15	Final

== Results ==
=== Heats ===
Note: Top six in each heat (Q) and the next six fastest (q) advanced to the semi-finals.

==== Heat 1 ====
Rank	Athlete	Nationality	Time	Notes
1	Filbert Bayi	Tanzania	8:21.38	Q
2	Eshetu Tura	Ethiopia	8:23.73	Q
3	Bogusław Mamiński	Poland	8:23.92	Q
4	Wolfgang Konrad	Austria	8:24.92	Q
5	Francisco Sánchez	Spain	8:27.50	Q
6	Tommy Ekblom	Finland	8:27.80	Q
7	Aleksandr Vorobey	Soviet Union	8:42.59	q
8	Tony Staynings	Great Britain	8:47.42	q
9	Nicolae Voicu	Romania	8:48.97	
10	Anders Carlson	Sweden	9:01.77	

==== Heat 2 ====
Rank	Athlete	Nationality	Time	Notes
1	Bronisław Malinowski	Poland	8:29.80	Q
2	Dušan Moravčík	Czechoslovakia	8:33.31	Q
3	Serhiy Olizarenko	Soviet Union	8:34.20	Q
4	Colin Reitz	Great Britain	8:35.21	Q
5	Roberto Volpi	Italy	8:35.53	Q
6	Vesa Laukkanen	Finland	8:38.33	Q
7	Paul Copu	Romania	8:45.54	q
8	Girma Wolde-Hana	Ethiopia	8:54.60	
9	Ralf Pönitzsch	East Germany	8:56.45	
10	Abdul Karim Joumaa	Syria	9:29.38	
—	José Sena	Portugal	—	DNF

==== Heat 3 ====
Rank	Athlete	Nationality	Time	Notes
1	Domingo Ramón	Spain	8:31.81	Q
2	Anatoly Dimov	Soviet Union	8:33.18	Q
3	Vasile Bichea	Romania	8:35.35	Q
4	Krzysztof Wesołowski	Poland	8:35.58	Q
5	Roger Hackney	Great Britain	8:36.34	Q
6	Giuseppe Gerbi	Italy	8:37.03	Q
7	Lahcen Babaci	Algeria	8:38.68	q
8	Hailu Wolde-Tsadik	Ethiopia	8:40.98	q
9	Stanimir Nenov	Bulgaria	8:43.77	q
10	Albert Marie	Seychelles	9:19.62	
—	Tapio Kantanen	Finland	—	DNS

=== Semi-finals ===
Note: Top four in each heat (Q) and the next four fastest (q) advanced to the final.

==== Semi-final 1 ====
Rank	Athlete	Nationality	Time	Notes
1	Filbert Bayi	Tanzania	8:16.11	Q
2	Eshetu Tura	Ethiopia	8:16.17	Q
3	Bogusław Mamiński	Poland	8:18.78	Q
4	Francisco Sánchez	Spain	8:18.96	Q
5	Anatoliy Dimov	Soviet Union	8:24.81	q
6	Lahcen Babaci	Algeria	8:25.47	q
7	Roberto Volpi	Italy	8:29.70	
8	Colin Reitz	Great Britain	8:29.75	
9	Krzysztof Wesołowski	Poland	8:33.02	
10	Vesa Laukkanen	Finland	8:33.30	
11	Paul Copu	Romania	8:44.91	
12	Stanimir Nenov	Bulgaria	8:50.17	

==== Semi-final 2 ====
Rank	Athlete	Nationality	Time	Notes
1	Bronisław Malinowski	Poland	8:21.15	Q
2	Domingo Ramón	Spain	8:21.94	Q
3	Vasile Bichea	Romania	8:24.23	Q
4	Tommy Ekblom	Finland	8:24.29	Q
5	Giuseppe Gerbi	Italy	8:27.19	q
6	Dušan Moravčík	Czechoslovakia	8:28.00	q
7	Roger Hackney	Great Britain	8:29.18	
8	Hailu Wolde-Tsadik	Ethiopia	8:34.94	
9	Aleksandr Vorobey	Soviet Union	8:44.24	
10	Wolfgang Konrad	Austria	8:51.59	
11	Tony Staynings	Great Britain	8:52.30	
—	Serhiy Olizarenko	Soviet Union	—	DNF

=== Final ===
Rank	Athlete	Nationality	Time	Notes
1st place, gold medalist(s)	Bronisław Malinowski	Poland	8:09.70	
2nd place, silver medalist(s)	Filbert Bayi	Tanzania	8:12.48	NR
3rd place, bronze medalist(s)	Eshetu Tura	Ethiopia	8:13.57	
4	Domingo Ramón	Spain	8:15.74	
5	Francisco Sánchez	Spain	8:17.93	
6	Giuseppe Gerbi	Italy	8:18.47	PB
7	Bogusław Mamiński	Poland	8:19.43	
8	Anatoliy Dimov	Soviet Union	8:19.75	
9	Vasile Bichea	Romania	8:23.86	
10	Dušan Moravčík	Czechoslovakia	8:29.03	
11	Lahcen Babaci	Algeria	8:31.80	
12	Tommy Ekblom	Finland	8:40.86	

== See also ==
- 1976 Men's Olympic 3000 m Steeplechase (Montreal)
- 1978 Men's European Championships 3000 m Steeplechase (Prague)
- 1982 Men's European Championships 3000 m Steeplechase (Athens)
- 1983 Men's World Championships 3000 m Steeplechase (Helsinki)
- 1984 Men's Olympic 3000 m Steeplechase (Los Angeles)
- 1986 Men's European Championships 3000 m Steeplechase (Stuttgart)
