= Athletics at the 1970 British Commonwealth Games – Men's 3000 metres steeplechase =

Men's 3000 metres steeplechase at the 1970 British Commonwealth Games
- Venue: Meadowbank Stadium, Edinburgh
- Dates: 22 and 25 July 1966

Medalists
gold medal	Tony Manning	Australia
silver medal	Ben Jipcho	Kenya
bronze medal	Amos Biwott	Kenya

The men's 3000 metres steeplechase event at the 1970 British Commonwealth Games was held on 22 and 25 July at the Meadowbank Stadium in Edinburgh, Scotland. It was the third time that the reintroduced metric distance was contested at the Games.

== Medallists ==
Medallists
Gold	Silver	Bronze
Tony Manning; Australia	Ben Jipcho; Kenya	Amos Biwott; Kenya

== Results ==
=== Heats ===
==== Qualification for final ====
The first 5 in each heat (Q) qualified directly for the final.

Heats results
Rank	Heat	Name	Nationality	Time	Notes
1	1	Amos Biwott	Kenya	8:37.0	Q
2	1	Kerry O'Brien	Australia	8:41.2	Q
3	1	Grant McLaren	Canada	8:47.2	Q
4	1	Bernard Hayward	Wales	8:49.2	Q
5	1	Andy Holden	England	8:49.2	Q
6	1	Chris Perry	England	8:59.6	
7	1	Peter Griffiths	Wales	9:07.6	
8	1	Frank Allen	Guernsey	9:22.4	
9	1	Abdul Karim	Pakistan	9:28.0	
1	2	Benjamin Kogo	Kenya	8:44.8	Q
2	2	Ben Jipcho	Kenya	8:45.0	Q
3	2	Tony Manning	Australia	8:46.2	Q
4	2	David Brayan-Jones	Scotland	8:52.6	Q
5	2	Gerald Stevens	England	?:??.?	Q
6	2	Ray Varey	Canada	9:02.2	
7	2	David Logue	Northern Ireland	9:49.8	
	2	Ronald McAndrew	Wales	DNF	

=== Final ===
Final results
Rank	Name	Nationality	Time	Notes
1st place, gold medalist(s)	Tony Manning	Australia	8:26.2	
2nd place, silver medalist(s)	Ben Jipcho	Kenya	8:29.6	
3rd place, bronze medalist(s)	Amos Biwott	Kenya	8:30.8	
4	David Brayan-Jones	Scotland	8:33.8	
5	Andy Holden	England	8:35.6	
6	Benjamin Kogo	Kenya	8:44.8	
7	Bernard Hayward	Wales	8:39.8	
8	Gerald Stevens	England	8:49.4	
9	Grant McLaren	Canada	8:55.4	
	Kerry O'Brien	Australia	DNF	
