= Athletics at the 1977 Summer Universiade – Men's 3000 metres steeplechase =

The men's 3000 metres steeplechase event at the 1977 Summer Universiade was held at the Vasil Levski National Stadium in Sofia on 20 and 22 August.

== Medalists ==
Gold	Silver	Bronze
Michael Karst; West Germany	Paul Copu; Romania	Ron Addison; United States

== Results ==
=== Heats ===
Rank	Heat	Athlete	Nationality	Time	Notes
1	1	Ron Addison	United States	8:33.1	Q
2	1	Bronisław Malinowski	Poland	8:34.0	Q
3	1	Paul Copu	Romania	8:35.0	Q
4	1	Michael Karst	West Germany	8:35.3	Q
5	1	Roberto Volpi	Italy	8:35.6	Q
6	1	Anatoliy Skripkin	Soviet Union	8:36.3	q
7	1	John Davies	United States	8:46.4	
8	1	Stanimir Nenov	Bulgaria	8:47.8	
9	1	Masanari Shintaku	Japan	8:48.3	
10	1	Mohsen Ouerfelli	Tunisia	9:17.7	
11	1	Samuel Nyariki	Kenya	9:32.8	
1	2	Dan Betini	Romania	8:35.9	Q
2	2	Peter Larkins	Australia	8:36.5	Q
3	2	George Malley	United States	8:37.0	Q
4	2	Eberhard Weyel	West Germany	8:38.6	Q
5	2	Peter Lindtner	Austria	8:39.7	Q
6	2	Imrich Rák	Czechoslovakia	8:40.6	q
7	2	Tony Staynings	Great Britain	8:43.8	
8	2	Petko Yordanov	Bulgaria	8:47.9	
9	2	Mauri Kontu	Finland	9:05.1	
10	2	Dirk Geens	Belgium	9:15.5	
11	2	Alfredo Guerrero	Mexico	9:25.6	

=== Final ===
Rank	Athlete	Nationality	Time	Notes
1st place, gold medalist(s)	Michael Karst	West Germany	8:25.9	
2nd place, silver medalist(s)	Paul Copu	Romania	8:28.8	
3rd place, bronze medalist(s)	Ron Addison	United States	8:29.4	
4	Bronisław Malinowski	Poland	8:30.8	
5	Dan Betini	Romania	8:37.4	
6	Eberhard Weyel	West Germany	8:44.1	
7	Imrich Rák	Czechoslovakia	8:50.3	
8	Anatoliy Skripkin	Soviet Union	8:55.9	
9	Peter Larkins	Australia	8:56.5	
10	Roberto Volpi	Italy	9:03.7	
11	George Malley	United States	9:04.6	
12	Peter Lindtner	Austria	9:21.9	
