= Athletics at the 1976 Summer Olympics – Men's 3000 metres steeplechase =

Men's 3000 metres steeplechase at the Games of the XXI Olympiad
- Olympic Athletics
- Venue: Olympic Stadium
- Dates: 25 July 1976 (qualifying); 28 July 1976 (final)
- Competitors: 24 from 16 nations

Medalists
1st place, gold medalist(s)		Anders Gärderud	Sweden
2nd place, silver medalist(s)		Bronisław Malinowski	Poland
3rd place, bronze medalist(s)		Frank Baumgartl	East Germany

These are the official results of the Men's 3000 metres steeplechase event at the 1976 Summer Olympics in Montreal. The competition was held on July 25, 1976, and on July 28, 1976.

== Summary ==
The final was held on July 28, 1976. Contrary to many other Olympic middle- and long-distance Olympic finals, this final was fast from the start. Finland's Tapio Kantanen, the defending Olympic bronze medalist from the 1972 Munich Summer Olympics, took the lead after the start. About one lap later, Britain's Dennis Coates briefly moved into the lead, before Spain's Antonio Campos passed him. Leading the 12-man field through 1,000 metres in 2:43.57, Campos kept up the fast pace.

With about 3.5 laps left, Poland's Bronislaw Malinowski took the lead. Before 2,000 metres, which Malinowski passed in 5:29.07, the lead group was reduced to four men: Malinowski, East Germany's Frank Baumgartl, Sweden's Anders Gärderud, and Finland's Kantanen. West Germany's Michael Karst, the defending European Championships bronze medalist from Rome in 1974, rose to the fifth place, and tried unsuccessfully to pursue the lead group. With about 600 metres left, Kantanen began to struggle, and he dropped decisively from the lead group early on the last back straight. Around the same time, Gärderud sprinted past Malinowski - the exact reverse of what Malinowski had managed to do in Rome in 1974. Baumgartl fought hard with Malinowski for the second place, and was able to pass the Polish steeplechaser fully by early on the final bend. After the last water barrier, Baumgartl launched his final kick, and closed the gap on Gärderud.

As the leading duo jumped to the last barrier, Baumgartl appeared to be in a slight lead. However, the East German steeplechaser timed his last jump a bit too late, hitting the final barrier with his right knee. As Baumgartl fell to the track, Gärderud was able to sprint into a wider lead over Malinowski, who had to jump over the fallen East German. Although Kantanen saw Baumgartl's fall, he was at least ten metres too far to pass the East German, who very quickly got up, and sprinted remarkably quickly towards the finish line. All the top four runners set their personal and national records, while Gärderud set also the world, Olympic, European, and Nordic (or Scandinavian) record in this distance. Gärderud's Olympic record would last until 1988, when Kenya's Julius Kariuki broke it in the Seoul Summer Olympics.

However, Kariuki's countryman Henry Rono set a new world record at this distance already in 1978 in Seattle. (Hannus, Matti, The Montreal Olympic Book, Helsinki, Finland, 1976;

== Records ==
Prior to the 1976 Summer Olympics, the existing world and Olympic records were as follows:

World record	Anders Gärderud (SWE)	8:09.70	Stockholm, Sweden	1 July 1975
Olympic record	Kipchoge Keino (KEN)	8:23.64	Munich, West Germany	7 September 1972

The following new world and Olympic records were set during this competition:

Date	Event	Athlete	Time	Notes
25 July 1976	Qualifying	Bronisław Malinowski (POL)	8:18.56	OR
28 July 1976	Final	Anders Gärderud (SWE)	8:08.02	WR, OR

The following national records were established during the competition:

Country	Athlete	Round	Time
Poland	Bronisław Malinowski (POL)	Final	8:09.11

== Results ==
=== Heats ===
Held on 25 July 1976. Note: Top six in each heat (Q) advanced to the final.

==== Heat 1 ====
Rank	Athlete	Nationality	Time	Notes
1	Bronisław Malinowski	Poland	8:18.56	Q, OR
2	Frank Baumgartl	East Germany	8:21.25	Q
3	Anders Gärderud	Sweden	8:21.43	Q
4	Antonio Campos	Spain	8:24.53	Q
5	Ismo Toukonen	Finland	8:27.96	Q
6	Henry Marsh	United States	8:31.46	Q
7	Jean-Paul Villain	France	8:35.03	
8	John Bicourt	Great Britain	8:35.71	
9	Willi Maier	West Germany	8:44.82	
10	Peter Larkins	Australia	8:46.89	
11	Ágúst Ásgeirsson	Iceland	8:53.95	
—	Gerd Frähmcke	West Germany	DNF	
—	José Andrade da Silva	Brazil	DNS	

==== Heat 2 ====
Rank	Athlete	Nationality	Time	Notes
1	Dennis Coates	Great Britain	8:18.95	Q
2	Tapio Kantanen	Finland	8:20.82	Q
3	Dan Glans	Sweden	8:23.73	Q
4	Michael Karst	West Germany	8:25.02	Q
5	Euan Robertson	New Zealand	8:26.31	Q
6	Tony Staynings	Great Britain	8:29.21	Q
7	Paul Thys	Belgium	8:31.55	
8	Doug Brown	United States	8:33.25	
9	Takaharu Koyama	Japan	8:37.28	
10	Mike Roche	United States	8:37.36	
11	Dušan Moravčík	Czechoslovakia	8:41.95	
12	Gheorghe Cefan	Romania	8:57.22	

=== Final ===
Rank	Athlete	Nationality	Time	Notes
1st place, gold medalist(s)	Anders Gärderud	Sweden	8:08.02	WR
2nd place, silver medalist(s)	Bronisław Malinowski	Poland	8:09.11	NR
3rd place, bronze medalist(s)	Frank Baumgartl	East Germany	8:10.36	NR
4	Tapio Kantanen	Finland	8:12.60	NR
5	Michael Karst	West Germany	8:20.14	
6	Euan Robertson	New Zealand	8:21.08	
7	Dan Glans	Sweden	8:21.53	
8	Antonio Campos	Spain	8:22.65	
9	Dennis Coates	Great Britain	8:22.99	
10	Henry Marsh	United States	8:23.99	
11	Tony Staynings	Great Britain	8:33.66	
12	Ismo Toukonen	Finland	8:42.74	
