= Athletics at the 1970 Summer Universiade – Men's 3000 metres steeplechase =

The men's 3000 metres steeplechase event at the 1970 Summer Universiade was held at the Stadio Comunale in Turin on 4 and 5 September 1970.

== Medalists ==
Gold	Silver	Bronze
Mikhail Zhelev; Bulgaria	Andy Holden; Great Britain	Takaharu Koyama; Japan

== Results ==
=== Heats ===
Rank	Heat	Athlete	Nationality	Time	Notes
1	1	Mikhail Zhelev	Bulgaria	8:46.4	Q
2	1	Takaharu Koyama	Japan	8:47.2	Q
3	1	Grant McLaren	Canada	8:58.6	Q
4	1	Ryszard Krzysztofik	Poland	9:00.6	Q
5	1	Andy Holden	Great Britain	9:05.6	Q
6	1	Frank Sonntag	West Germany	9:08.2	Q
7	1	Dennis Bayham	United States	9:12.8	
8	1	John Stanley	Australia	9:22.4	
1	2	Boualem Rahoui	Algeria	8:57.2	Q
2	2	Georgi Tikhov	Bulgaria	9:04.0	Q
3	2	John Rix	Great Britain	9:05.0	Q
4	2	Karl-Heinz Betz	West Germany	9:07.4	Q
5	2	Ramón Montero	Chile	9:09.0	Q
6	2	Amor Lassoued	Tunisia	9:23.4	Q
7	2	Sid Sink	United States	9:26.8	
	2	Şahin Turhan	Turkey	DNF	

=== Final ===
Rank	Name	Nationality	Time	Notes
1st place, gold medalist(s)	Mikhail Zhelev	Bulgaria	8:32.6	
2nd place, silver medalist(s)	Andy Holden	Great Britain	8:36.6	
3rd place, bronze medalist(s)	Takaharu Koyama	Japan	8:38.0	
4	Georgi Tikhov	Bulgaria	8:38.4	
5	Boualem Rahoui	Algeria	8:42.0	
6	Grant McLaren	Canada	8:45.2	
7	John Rix	Great Britain	8:53.8	
8	Ryszard Krzysztofik	Poland	8:59.6	
9	Karl-Heinz Betz	West Germany	9:06.0	
10	Frank Sonntag	West Germany	9:07.6	
11	Amor Lassoued	Tunisia	9:31.8	
12	Ramón Montero	Chile	9:56.8	
