= Anthony Manning (disambiguation) =

Anthony Manning (born 1992) is an American association football player.

Anthony or Tony Manning may also refer to:

- Anthony Manning (educator), British educationalist
- Tony Manning (born 1943), Australian runner
