= Doug Brown (runner, born 1952) =

American athlete

Personal information
- Born: March 1, 1952 (age 74) Detroit, Michigan, United States

Sport
- Sport: Steeplechase running
Medal record
Representing United States
World Cross Country Championships
Silver medal – second place	1983 Gateshead	Team race

Charles Douglas Brown (born March 1, 1952) is a retired American track and field athlete, whose specialty was the Steeplechase.

== Early career ==
While competing for the University of Tennessee he won the NCAA Championship in the steeplechase twice in a row, which qualified him to run in the 1973 World University Games. After college he ran with the Athletics West track club, one of the first mega teams sponsored by Nike. He was United States (Amateur Athletic Union) National Champion in 1973 and 1980.

== Olympic athlete ==
Brown competed for the United States in two Olympic Games, running the steeplechase at the 1972 and 1976 Olympics. He qualified for the 1980 U.S. Olympic team but did not compete due to the U.S. Olympic Committee's boycott of the 1980 Summer Olympics in Moscow, Russia. He was one of 461 athletes to receive a Congressional Gold Medal instead. He was a surprise second place at the 1972 Olympic Trials, sprinting from a battle to make the team around leading contender and hometown favorite, Steve Savage, who had been battling Mike Manley for the lead. In 1976, with 1972 winner Manley injured hitting a barrier in the first few laps of the race, Brown outsprinted Henry Marsh and picked up the win by 0.03 of a second. That was not even the most thrilling finish in that race, as Mike Roche fell over the last barrier, managed to right himself and outsprint Don Timm for the final position on the team.

== 1983 IAAF World Cross Country Championships ==
Brown ran on the American silver medal winning team at the 1983 IAAF World Cross Country Championships.
