= 1973 European Athletics Indoor Championships – Men's 3000 metres =

The men's 3000 metres event at the 1973 European Athletics Indoor Championships was held on 10 and 11 March in Rotterdam.

== Medalists ==
Gold	Silver	Bronze
Emiel Puttemans; Belgium	Willy Polleunis; Belgium	Pekka Päivärinta; Finland

== Results ==
=== Heats ===
Held on 10 March.

First 3 from each heat (Q) and the next 2 fastest (q) qualified for the final.

Rank	Heat	Name	Nationality	Time	Notes
1	1	Emiel Puttemans	Belgium	7:51.02	Q
2	1	Gert Eisenberg	East Germany	7:52.54	Q
3	1	Pekka Päivärinta	Finland	7:53.68	Q, NR
4	1	Hartmut Bräuer	West Germany	7:55.18	q
5	1	Bronisław Malinowski	Poland	7:55.73	q, NR
6	1	Minivassik Abdulin	Soviet Union	7:56.82	
7	1	Jos Hermens	Netherlands	7:59.02	
8	2	Willy Polleunis	Belgium	7:59.69	Q
9	2	Egbert Nijstadt	Netherlands	8:00.29	Q
10	2	Vladimir Zatonskiy	Soviet Union	8:00.74	Q
11	2	Mikko Ala-Leppilampi	Finland	8:02.04	
12	1	Werner Meier	Switzerland	8:02.60	
13	2	Hans-Dieter Schulten	West Germany	8:03.93	
14	1	John van der Wansem	Netherlands	8:05.07	
15	2	Antonio Burgos	Spain	8:05.82	
16	2	Josef Jánský	Czechoslovakia	8:06.78	
17	2	Mikhail Zhelev	Bulgaria	8:09.06	
18	2	Jürgen Haase	East Germany	8:09.32	
19	1	Willi Maier	West Germany	8:11.84	
20	2	André Ornelis	Belgium	8:14.35	
21	2	Michel Louette	France	8:27.41	

=== Final ===
Held on 11 March.

Rank	Name	Nationality	Time	Notes
1st place, gold medalist(s)	Emiel Puttemans	Belgium	7:44.51	
2nd place, silver medalist(s)	Willy Polleunis	Belgium	7:51.86	
3rd place, bronze medalist(s)	Pekka Päivärinta	Finland	7:52.97	NR
4	Egbert Nijstadt	Netherlands	7:54.60	NR
5	Gert Eisenberg	East Germany	7:55.09	
6	Vladimir Zatonskiy	Soviet Union	7:55.12	
7	Hartmut Bräuer	West Germany	8:02.20	
8	Bronisław Malinowski	Poland	8:07.08	
