= Wiemer =

Wiemer is a German language surname. It stems from a reduced form of the male given name Wigmar – and may refer to:

- Daniel Wiemer (1976), German actor
- Jason Wiemer (1976), Canadian retired professional ice hockey forward
- Jim Wiemer (1961), Canadian former professional ice hockey defenceman
- Joey Wiemer (1999), American baseball player
- Robert Wiemer (died 2014), American film and television director, writer, producer and editor
