= Olizarenko =

Olizarenko (Russian: Олизаренко, Ukrainian: Олізаренко) is a surname. Notable people with the surname include:

- Anatoly Olizarenko (1936–1984), Soviet cyclist
- Nadiya Olizarenko (1953–2017), Soviet-Ukrainian middle-distance runner, wife of Serhiy
- Serhiy Olizarenko (1954–2024), Soviet-Ukrainian steeplechase runner
