= Sverre Sørnes =

Norwegian athlete

Sverre Øyvind Sørnes (born 20 February 1945) is a Norwegian long-distance runner who specialized in the 3000 metres steeplechase.

He competed at the 1971 European Championships, the 1972 Olympic Games and the 1974 European Championships without reaching the final. He represented the clubs Strandebarm IL and IL Gular.

In his main event, 3000 metres steeplechase, he became Norwegian champion in 1971, 1973, 1974, 1976 and 1977, and also won silver medals in 1969 and 1970. His main competitors were Arne Risa, Ståle Engen, Jan Voje and Knut Kvalheim. Sørnes also became Norwegian cross-country running champion (3 kilometres, short course) in 1970, 1971, 1972 and 1974.

In 1971 Sørnes overtook Ståle Engen as Norwegian record holder in the steeplechase, running 8:26.4 at Bislett stadion. He improved to 8:26.0 at Stockholm Olympic Stadium in June 1972. Sørnes lost his record to Knut Kvalheim in 1973. In the other running events, Sørnes clocked 1:51.3 in the 800 metres (1971); 3:42.9 in the 1500 metres (1971); 4:07.2 in the mile run (1969); 8:01.6 in the 3000 metres (1970); 14:04.0 in the 5000 metres (1973) and 30:54.8 in the 10,000 metres (1973).
