= Athletics at the 1975 Summer Universiade – Men's 3000 metres steeplechase =

The men's 3000 metres steeplechase event at the 1975 Summer Universiade was held at the Stadio Olimpico in Rome on 21 September.

The winning margin was 5.9 seconds which as of 2024 remains the greatest winning margin in the men's 3,000 metres steeplechase at these games.

== Results ==
Rank	Athlete	Nationality	Time	Notes
1st place, gold medalist(s)	Bronisław Malinowski	Poland	8:22.32	
2nd place, silver medalist(s)	Michael Karst	West Germany	8:28.22	
3rd place, bronze medalist(s)	Kazimierz Maranda	Poland	8:29.23	
4	Gheorghe Cefan	Romania	8:35.64	
5	Randy Smith	United States	8:38.41	
6	Enrico Cantoreggi	Italy	8:39.48	
7	John Davies	Great Britain	8:42.74	
8	Mariano Scartezzini	Italy	8:43.47	
9	Alfred Pankow	West Germany	8:45.58	
10	Dirk Geens	Belgium	8:51.12	
11	Francisco Gordillo	Spain	8:57.17	
12	Joe Sax	Canada	9:00.69	
13	Spyros Nakos	Greece	9:11.95	
14	Francisco Méndez	Mexico	9:28.28	
	René Pape	France	DNF	
