= Ståle Engen =

Norwegian long-distance runner

Ståle Engen (born 29 June 1947) is a Norwegian long-distance runner who specialized in the 3000 metres steeplechase.

He competed at the 1971 European Championships without reaching the final. He represented the club IF Sturla.

In his main event, 3000 metres steeplechase, he became Norwegian champion in 1970 and won the bronze medal in 1971. He also took a silver medal in the cross-country running (3 kilometres, short course) in 1970. His victory in the 3000 metres steeplechase gave Engen the 1970 King's Cup. In the same year he set a new Norwegian record at Stockholm Olympic Stadium with 8:31.4 minutes, beating Arne Risa's year-old record with exactly three seconds. In June 1971 the record was improved by exactly five seconds by Sverre Sørnes.

In the other running events, Engen clocked 1:52.8 in the 800 metres (1970); 3:45.0 in the 1500 metres (1970); 4:12.7 in the mile run (1971); 8:12.4 in the 3000 metres (1970); and 14:01.6 in the 5000 metres (1970).
