= 1974 European Athletics Indoor Championships – Men's 3000 metres =

Running competition held in Gothenburg on 9-10 March 1974

The men's 3000 metres event at the 1974 European Athletics Indoor Championships was held on 9 and 10 March in Gothenburg.

== Medalists ==
Gold	Silver	Bronze
Emiel Puttemans; Belgium	Paul Thijs; Belgium	Pavel Pěnkava; Czechoslovakia

== Results ==
=== Heats ===
Held on 9 March.
First 4 from each heat (Q) qualified directly for the final.

Rank	Heat	Name	Nationality	Time	Notes
1	1	Emiel Puttemans	Belgium	7:54.23	Q
2	1	Ray Smedley	Great Britain	7:55.20	Q
3	1	Josef Jánský	Czechoslovakia	7:55.49	Q
4	1	Jan Kondzior	Poland	7:56.20	Q
5	1	Dan Glans	Sweden	7:57.95	
6	2	Arne Kvalheim	Norway	7:58.44	Q
7	2	Pavel Pěnkava	Czechoslovakia	7:58.95	Q
8	2	Paul Thijs	Belgium	7:59.09	Q
9	1	Bram Wassenaar	Netherlands	7:59.77	
10	2	Antonio Burgos	Spain	8:00.90	Q
11	2	Aldo Tomasini	Italy	8:05.19	
12	1	Heinrich Händlhuber	Austria	8:08.54	
13	2	Ágúst Ásgeirsson	Iceland	8:44.28	

=== Final ===
Held on 10 March.

Rank	Name	Nationality	Time	Notes
1st place, gold medalist(s)	Emiel Puttemans	Belgium	7:48.48	
2nd place, silver medalist(s)	Paul Thijs	Belgium	7:51.76	
3rd place, bronze medalist(s)	Pavel Pěnkava	Czechoslovakia	7:51.79	NR
4	Arne Kvalheim	Norway	7:53.34	NR
5	Ray Smedley	Great Britain	7:54.43	
6	Josef Jánský	Czechoslovakia	7:55.00	
7	Antonio Burgos	Spain	7:56.25	
8	Jan Kondzior	Poland	8:07.75	
