= Panagiotis Nakopoulos =

Greek middle-distance runner

Personal information
- Nationality: Greek
- Born: 27 April 1946 (age 80)

Sport
- Sport: Middle-distance running
- Event: Steeplechase

Panagiotis Nakopoulos (born 27 April 1946) is a Greek middle-distance runner. He competed in the men's 3000 metres steeplechase at the 1972 Summer Olympics.
