= Jan Voje =

Norwegian athlete

Jan Voje (born 5 December 1942) is a Norwegian long-distance runner. He specialized in the 3000 metre steeplechase, in which he also competed at 1972 Olympic Games.

He represented the club Gjerpen IF, along with his twin brother Andor Voje. His personal best times were 8:02.0 in the 3000 metres (1973), 8:29.8 in the steeplechase (1973), 14:00.6 in the 5000 metres (1973) and 29:10.2 in the 10,000 metres (1973). In middle-distance races he had 1:54.0 in the 800 metres (1965), 3:46.5 in the 1500 metres (1971) and 4:13.1 in the mile run (1959).

His only international outing came at the 1964 Summer Olympics, where he competed in the heats of the steeplechase. He was also selected for the 1974 European Championships, but did not start.

On the track he became Norwegian steeplechase champion in 1972. His sole gold medal in his special event was due to a dominance in the event by Sverre Sørnes; earlier also Arne Risa. Voje won national silver medals in 1968, 1973 and 1974 and bronze medals in 1966 and 1970. He also won the 2 kilometre cross-country championship in 1966 and 1967, and won bronze medals in 1968 and 1969 before the event was discontinued. In the 8 kilometre event, defunct now as well, he won a Norwegian bronze medal in 1973 behind Knut Børø and Per Halle.
