= Girma Wolde-Hana =

Ethiopian middle-distance runner

Personal information
- Nationality: Ethiopian
- Born: 26 July 1952 (age 73)

Sport
- Sport: Middle-distance running
- Event: Steeplechase

Girma Wolde-Hana (born 26 July 1952) is an Ethiopian middle-distance runner. He competed in the men's 3000 metres steeplechase at the 1980 Summer Olympics.
