= Anatoliy Dimov =

Soviet steeplechase runner

Personal information
- Nationality: Soviet
- Born: 26 February 1956 (age 70)

Sport
- Sport: athletics
- Event: Steeplechase

Anatoliy Dimov (born 26 February 1956) is a former Soviet steeplechase runner. He competed in the men's 3000 metres steeplechase at the 1980 Summer Olympics.
