= Aleksandr Morozov (athlete) =

Soviet middle-distance runner

Personal information
- Nationality: Soviet
- Born: 13 October 1939 (age 86) Tomsk, Russian SFSR, Soviet Union

Sport
- Sport: Middle-distance running
- Event: Steeplechase
Medal record
Men's athletics
Representing Soviet Union
European Championships
Silver medal – second place	1969 Athens	3000 m st.

Aleksandr Morozov (born 13 October 1939) is a Soviet middle-distance runner. He competed in the men's 3000 metres steeplechase at the 1968 Summer Olympics.
