= Frank Baumgartl =

East German track and field athlete

Olympic medal record

Men's athletics
Bronze medal – third place	1976 Montreal	3000 m s'chase

Frank Baumgartl (29 May 1955 – 26 August 2010) was an East German track and field athlete, who specialised in the 3000 meters steeplechase. He was born in Bad Schlema.

At the 1976 Summer Olympics in Montreal Frank Baumgartl won the Olympic bronze medal in a new personal best time of 8:10.36 minutes. Approaching the last obstacle, he was just behind Anders Gärderud of Sweden, who was in the lead. Baumgartl seemed even about to pass Gärderud. However, as Baumgartl was about to challenge Gärderud for the gold medal, he misjudged the steeple barrier and fell. Baumgartl was then passed by Bronisław Malinowski from Poland, a veteran steeplechaser, who took the silver (Malinowski also won the gold in Moscow 1980 Olympic steeplechase) medal. Baumgartl recovered, and took the bronze medal. Baumgartl's time remained his career best, and places him third on the German all-time performers list behind Damian Kallabis and Hagen Melzer.

Baumgartl never became East German champion. He competed for the sports club SC Karl-Marx-Stadt during his active career. He died in Lake Como, Italy, on 26 August 2010 during a cycling tour from cardiac arrest.
