= Wigmar =

Wigmar is Germanic male given name and a surname. It is a Germanic dithematic name, from wig 'war, battle' + mari, 'famous'. Notable people with the name include:

- Josefine Winter Edle von Wigmar or Josefine Winter (1873–1943), Austrian Jewish painter, composer, and writer murdered in the Holocaust
- Wigmar Pedersen (born 1946), Danish middle-distance runner

== See also ==
- Guiomar
- Weimer
