= 1966 European Indoor Games – Men's 3000 metres =

The men's 3000 metres event at the 1966 European Indoor Games was held on 27 March in Dortmund.

== Results ==
Rank	Name	Nationality	Time	Notes
1st place, gold medalist(s)	Harald Norpoth	West Germany	7:56.0	
2nd place, silver medalist(s)	Siegfried Herrmann	East Germany	7:57.2	
3rd place, bronze medalist(s)	István Kiss	Hungary	8:05.0	
4	Alan Simpson	Great Britain	8:06.6	
5	Werner Girke	West Germany	8:06.6	
6	Anders Gärderud	Sweden	8:12.8	
