= 10,000 metres world record progression =

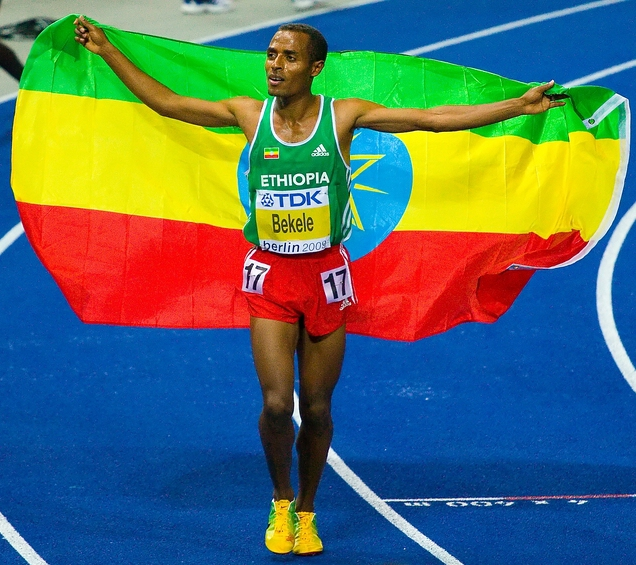
Former men's world record holder Kenenisa Bekele celebrating his 2009 world title in the 10,000 m

The official world records in the 10,000 metres are held by Ugandan Joshua Cheptegei with 26:11 minutes for men and Kenyan Beatrice Chebet with 28:54.14 for women.

The first world record in the men's 10,000 metres was recognized by the International Association of Athletics Federations in 1912. The first ratified record, Jean Bouin's time of 30:58.8 minutes, had been run the year before. As of June 21, 2009, 37 men's world records have been ratified by the IAAF in the event.

The first world record in the women's 10,000 metres was recognized by the International Association of Athletics Federations in 1981. As of June 21, 2009, eight women's world records have been ratified by the IAAF in the event. Before the event was recognised by the IAAF as an official world record event the 3000 metres was the most common international women's long-distance track event, although women did sometimes compete over 10,000 m before its addition to the World Championships and Olympic programme in 1987 and 1988, respectively.

== Men ==
=== Pre-IAAF ===
| Time | Athlete | Date | Place |
|---|---|---|---|
| 32:35.0^{[a]} | William Howitt (GBR) | 1847-04-05 | Peckham, United Kingdom |
| 32:09.0^{[b]} | Walter George (GBR) | 1882-03-25 | London, United Kingdom |
| 31:53.4^{[b]} | Walter George (GBR) | 1884-04-07 | London, United Kingdom |
| 31:40.0^{[b]} | Walter George (GBR) | 1884-07-28 | London, United Kingdom |
| 31:23.1 | William Cummings (GBR) | 1885-09-28 | London, United Kingdom |
| 31:02.4 | Alfred Shrubb (GBR) | 1904-11-05 | Glasgow, United Kingdom |

- ^{a} Howitt's time was recorded at the point of 10,186 m, en route to a longer distance.
- ^{b} George's times were recorded at the 6.25 miles (10.06 km) point.

=== IAAF world records ===
| Time | | Athlete | Date | Place |
| Ratified | Auto | Athlete | Date | Place |
|---|---|---|---|---|
| 30:58.8 | | Jean Bouin (FRA) | 16 November 1911 | Paris, France |
| 30:40.2 | | Paavo Nurmi (FIN) | 22 June 1921 | Stockholm, Sweden |
| 30:35.4 | | Ville Ritola (FIN) | 25 May 1924 | Helsinki, Finland |
| 30:23.2 | | Ville Ritola (FIN) | 6 July 1924 | Paris, France |
| 30:06.2 | | Paavo Nurmi (FIN) | 31 August 1924 | Kuopio, Finland |
| 30:05.6 | | Ilmari Salminen (FIN) | 18 July 1937 | Kouvola, Finland |
| 30:02.0 | | Taisto Mäki (FIN) | 29 September 1938 | Tampere, Finland |
| 29:52.6 | | Taisto Mäki (FIN) | 17 September 1939 | Helsinki, Finland |
| 29:35.4 | | Viljo Heino (FIN) | 25 August 1944 | Helsinki, Finland |
| 29:28.2 | | Emil Zátopek (TCH) | 11 June 1949 | Ostrava, Czechoslovakia |
| 29:27.2 | | Viljo Heino (FIN) | 1 September 1949 | Kouvola, Finland |
| 29:21.2 | | Emil Zátopek (TCH) | 22 October 1949 | Ostrava, Czechoslovakia |
| 29:02.6 | | Emil Zátopek (TCH) | 4 August 1950 | Turku, Finland |
| 29:01.6 | | Emil Zátopek (TCH) | 1 November 1953 | Stara Boleslav, Czechoslovakia |
| 28:54.2 | | Emil Zátopek (TCH) | 1 June 1954 | Brussels, Belgium |
| 28:42.8 | | Sandor Iharos (HUN) | 15 July 1956 | Budapest, Hungary |
| 28:30.4 | | Vladimir Kuts (URS) | 11 September 1956 | Moscow, Soviet Union |
| 28:18.8 | | Pyotr Bolotnikov (URS) | 15 October 1960 | Kiev, Soviet Union |
| 28:18.2 | | Pyotr Bolotnikov (URS) | 11 August 1962 | Moscow, Soviet Union |
| 28:15.6 | | Ron Clarke (AUS) | 18 December 1963 | Melbourne, Australia |
| 27:39.4 | 27:39.89 | Ron Clarke (AUS) | 14 July 1965 | Oslo, Norway |
| 27:38.4 | 27:38.35 | Lasse Virén (FIN) | 3 September 1972 | Munich, West Germany |
| 27:30.8 | 27:30.80 | David Bedford (GBR) | 13 July 1973 | London, United Kingdom |
| 27:30.5 | 27:30.47 | Samson Kimobwa (KEN) | 30 June 1977 | Helsinki, Finland |
| 27:22.4 | 27:22.47 | Henry Rono (KEN) | 11 June 1978 | Vienna, Austria |
| 27:13.81 | | Fernando Mamede (POR) | 2 July 1984 | Stockholm, Sweden |
| 27:08.23 | | Arturo Barrios (MEX) | 18 August 1989 | West Berlin, West Germany |
| 27:07.91 | | Richard Chelimo (KEN) | 5 July 1993 | Stockholm, Sweden |
| 26:58.38 | | Yobes Ondieki (KEN) | 10 July 1993 | Oslo, Norway |
| 26:52.23 | | William Sigei (KEN) | 22 July 1994 | Oslo, Norway |
| 26:43.53 | | Haile Gebrselassie (ETH) | 5 June 1995 | Hengelo, Netherlands |
| 26:38.08 | | Salah Hissou (MAR) | 23 August 1996 | Brussels, Belgium |
| 26:31.32 | | Haile Gebrselassie (ETH) | 4 July 1997 | Oslo, Norway |
| 26:27.85 | | Paul Tergat (KEN) | 22 August 1997 | Brussels, Belgium |
| 26:22.75 | | Haile Gebrselassie (ETH) | 1 June 1998 | Hengelo, Netherlands |
| 26:20.31 | | Kenenisa Bekele (ETH) | 8 June 2004 | Ostrava, Czech Republic |
| 26:17.53 | | Kenenisa Bekele (ETH) | 26 August 2005 | Brussels, Belgium |
| 26:11.00 | | Joshua Cheptegei (UGA) | 7 October 2020 | Valencia, Spain |

Where present, the "Auto" column gives a fully automatic time that was additionally recorded where the ratified mark was hand-timed, or from which the ratified mark was rounded to the 10th of a second, depending on the rules then in place.

Auto times to the hundredth of a second were accepted by the IAAF for events up to and including 10,000 m from 1981. However, Henry Rono's 27:22.4, timed to the hundredth at 27:22.47, was not adjusted from 1981.

== Women ==
=== Pre-recognition ===
| Time | Athlete | Date | Place |
|---|---|---|---|
| 39:25.0 | Gertrud Schmidt (GDR) | 1966 | ? |
| 39:10.0 | Hannelore Middeke (GDR) | 1966 | ? |
| 38:06.4 | Ann O'Brien (IRL) | 1967-03-26 | Gormanstown, Ireland |
| 35:30.5 | Paola Pigni (ITA) | 1970-05-09 | Milan, Italy |
| 34:51.0 | Kathy Gibbons (USA) | 1971-06-12 | Phoenix, United States |
| 35:00.4 | Julie Brown (USA) | 1975-03-29 | Los Angeles, United States |
| 34:01.4 | Christa Vahlensieck (FRG) | 1975-08-20 | Wolfsburg, West Germany |
| 33:34.17 Mx | Loa Olafsson (DEN) | 1977-03-19 | Hvidovre, Denmark |
| 33:15.09 | Peg Neppel (USA) | 1977-06-09 | Los Angeles, United States |
| 32:43.2 | Natalia Mărăşescu (ROM) | 1978-01-22 | Băile Felix, Romania |
| 31:45.4 Mx | Loa Olafsson (DEN) | 1978-04-06 | Copenhagen, Denmark |
| 32:30.80 | Olga Krentser (URS) | 1981-08-07 | Moscow, Soviet Union |

=== IAAF world records ===
| Ratified |
| Not ratified |
| Ratified but later rescinded |
| Pending ratification |

| Time | Athlete | Date | Place |
|---|---|---|---|
| 32:17.20 | Yelena Sipatova (URS) | 1981-10-19 | Moscow, Soviet Union |
| 31:35.3 | Mary Decker-Slaney (USA) | 1982-07-16 | Eugene, USA |
| 31:35.01 | Lyudmila Baranova (URS) | 1983-05-29 | Krasnodar, Soviet Union |
| 31:27.58 | Raisa Sadreydinova (URS) | 1983-09-07 | Odessa, Soviet Union |
| 31:13.78 | Olga Bondarenko (URS) | 1984-06-24 | Kiev, Soviet Union |
| 30:59.42 | Ingrid Kristiansen (NOR) | 1985-07-27 | Oslo, Norway |
| 30:13.74 | Ingrid Kristiansen (NOR) | 1986-07-05 | Oslo, Norway |
| 29:31.78 | Wang Junxia (CHN) | 1993-09-08 | Beijing, PR China |
| 29:17.45 | Almaz Ayana (ETH) | 2016-08-12 | Rio de Janeiro, Brazil |
| 29:06.82 | Sifan Hassan (NED) | 2021-06-06 | Hengelo, Netherlands |
| 29:01.03 | Letesenbet Gidey (ETH) | 2021-06-08 | Hengelo, Netherlands |
| 28:54.14 | Beatrice Chebet (KEN) | 2024-05-25 | Eugene, United States |
