= Dušan Moravčík =

Slovak athlete

Personal information
- Nationality: Slovak
- Born: May 27, 1948 (age 78) Bánov, Czechoslovakia
- Height: 1.70 m (5 ft 7 in)
- Weight: 65 kg (143 lb)

Sport
- Country: Czechoslovakia
- Sport: Athletics
- Event: Steeplechase runner
- Club: Zbrojovka Brno, Dukla Praha

Achievements and titles
- Personal best: 3000 m steeplechase: 8:23.8 (1972)
Medal record
Men's athletics
Representing Czechoslovakia
European Championships
Silver medal – second place	1971 Helsinki	3000 m st.

Dušan Moravčík (born 27 May 1948) is a former Slovak athlete who competed mainly in the 3000 metres steeplechase. He won silver medal in 3000 metres steeplechase at the 1971 European Athletics Championships.

== Biography ==
Dušan Moravčík was born on born 27 May 1948 in Bánov, Czechoslovakia. represented Czechoslovakia in three editions of the Summer Olympics (1972, 1976 and 1980). He is the current Czech records holder of the 3000 metres steeplechase.

== Achievements ==
Year	Competition	Venue	Position	Event	Performance	Notes
1972	Olympic Games	(West Germany) Munich	5th	3000 metres steeplechase	8:29:06	
1976	Olympic Games	(Canada) Montreal	Heat	3000 metres steeplechase	8:41:95	
1980	Olympic Games	(Soviet Union) Moscow	10th	3000 metres steeplechase	8:29:03	

== See also ==
- List of European Athletics Championships medalists (men)
- Czech records in athletics
