= Olympic Dream =

Autobiography of Henry Rono

- Author: Henry Rono
- Genre: Autobiography
- Publication date: 2007

Olympic Dream (ISBN 978-1-4343-2787-1), is the 2007 autobiography of track-and-field runner Henry Rono.

The book documents Rono's childhood in Kenya, his running career at Washington State University, and his meteoric climb to fame after breaking four world records in 81 days. Rono's first-person account also details his longtime struggle with alcoholism, the 1976 and 1980 Olympic boycotts, and his pursuit of his dream to become a teacher.

Notable sections include Rono's 1982 victory over Alberto Salazar and Rono's arrest in 1986, when he was falsely accused of robbing six New Jersey banks.
