= Sergey Skripka =

Soviet athlete

Personal information
- Full name: Sergey Nikolayevich Skripka
- Nationality: Soviet
- Born: 9 January 1950 (age 76)

Sport
- Sport: Middle-distance running
- Event: Steeplechase

Sergey Nikolayevich Skripka (born 9 January 1950) is a Soviet middle-distance runner. He competed in the men's 3000 metres steeplechase at the 1972 Summer Olympics.
