= Anders Carlson (runner) =

Swedish middle-distance runner (born 1959)

Personal information
- Full name: Anders Roland Carlson
- Nationality: Swedish
- Born: 17 April 1959 (age 67)

Sport
- Sport: Middle-distance running
- Event: Steeplechase

Anders Roland Carlson (born 17 April 1959) is a Swedish middle-distance runner. He competed in the men's 3000 metres steeplechase at the 1980 Summer Olympics.
