= Vesa Laukkanen =

Finnish middle-distance runner

Personal information
- Nationality: Finnish
- Born: 9 April 1958 (age 68)

Sport
- Sport: Middle-distance running
- Event: Steeplechase

Vesa Laukkanen (born 9 April 1958) is a Finnish middle-distance runner. He competed in the men's 3000 metres steeplechase at the 1980 Summer Olympics.
