= Georges Kaiser =

Swiss middle-distance runner

Personal information
- Nationality: Swiss
- Born: 14 December 1942 (age 83)

Sport
- Sport: Middle-distance running
- Event: Steeplechase

Georges Kaiser (born 14 December 1942) is a Swiss middle-distance runner. He competed in the men's 3000 metres steeplechase at the 1972 Summer Olympics.
