= Samson Kimobwa =

Kenyan long-distance runner (1955-2013)

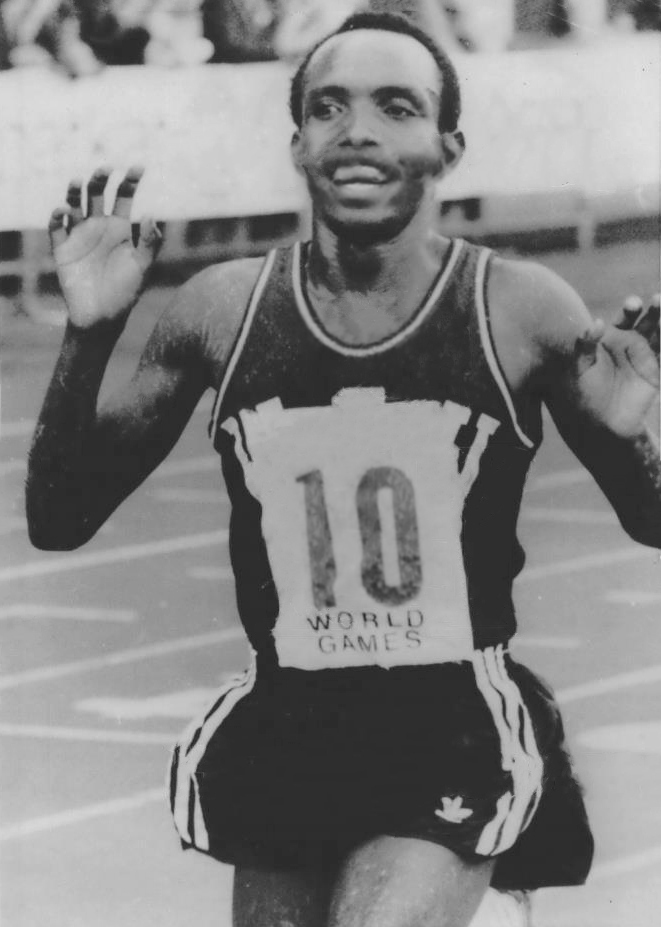
Kimombwa setting the world 10000 m record in 1977

Samson Kimobwa (15 September 1955 – 16 January 2013) was a runner from Kenya. He set a 10000 metres world record of 27:30.5 (27:30.47) on 30 June 1977 in Helsinki, Finland. The record was broken the following year by his compatriot Henry Rono. Before Kimobwa, the record was held by David Bedford of Great Britain.

Kimobwa was a three-time Pac-10 champion. He also won the 10000 metres at the NCAA Division I championships in 1977. In 1977 he finished third at the AAA Championships. He was one of several Kenyan Runners who went to the Washington State University in the late-1970s.

After his running career, he became a schoolteacher and coached athletes like Ismael Kirui and Boaz Cheboiywo.

Kimobwa died aged 57 in a Nairobi hospital on Wednesday 16 January 2013, after being admitted the previous day with a stomach ailment.

Records
Preceded by (United Kingdom) David Bedford	Men's 10,000 m World Record Holder; 30 June 1977 – 11 June 1978	Succeeded by (Kenya) Henry Rono
