= Aleksandr Vorobey =

Soviet athlete

Personal information
- Nationality: Soviet
- Born: 5 May 1957
- Died: 2007 (aged 49–50)

Sport
- Sport: Middle-distance running
- Event: Steeplechase

Aleksandr Vorobey (5 May 1957 – 2007) was a Soviet middle-distance runner. He competed in the men's 3000 metres steeplechase at the 1980 Summer Olympics.
