= Vasile Bichea =

Romanian middle-distance runner

Personal information
- Nationality: Romanian
- Born: 18 November 1950 (age 75)

Sport
- Sport: Middle-distance running
- Event: Steeplechase

Vasile Bichea (born 18 November 1950) is a Romanian middle-distance runner. He competed in the men's 3000 metres steeplechase at the 1980 Summer Olympics.
