= Spyridon Kontosoros =

Greek middle-distance runner

Personal information
- Nationality: Greek
- Born: 7 November 1947 (age 78)

Sport
- Sport: Middle-distance running
- Event: Steeplechase

Spyridon Kontosoros (born 7 November 1947) is a Greek middle-distance runner. He competed in the men's 3000 metres steeplechase at the 1972 Summer Olympics.
