= Tadeusz Zieliński (athlete) =

Polish athlete (1946–1977)

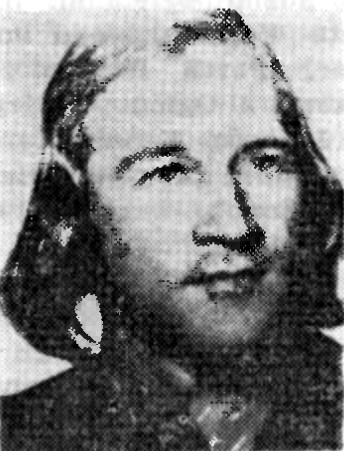

Personal information
- Nationality: Polish
- Born: 15 March 1946 Przyłęki, Poland
- Died: 26 August 1977 (aged 31) Poznań, Poland

Sport
- Sport: Middle-distance running
- Event: Steeplechase

Tadeusz Zieliński (15 March 1946 – 26 August 1977) was a Polish middle-distance runner. He competed in the men's 3000 metres steeplechase at the 1972 Summer Olympics.

Zieliński died on 26 August 1977 in a car crash, one year after running 8:37.4 for 3000 m steeplechase in Poznań.
