= Chris Perry (runner) =

British hurdler

Personal information
- Nationality: British (English)
- Born: Q4.1940 Lincoln, England

Sport
- Sport: Athletics
- Events: Steeplechase; Cross-country
- Club: Birchfield Harriers

Christopher John Perry (born 1940) is a former international runner who competed at the Commonwealth Games.

== Biography ==
Perry was a member of the Birchfield Harriers and specialised in the steeplechase. From Lincoln, he was a teacher by profession, and was a cross country champion, winning his first international cap in 1967.

Perry represented the England team at the 1970 British Commonwealth Games in Edinburgh, Scotland, where he competed in the men's 3000 metres steeplechase event.
