= Bronisław Malinowski (runner) =

Polish athlete (1951–1981)

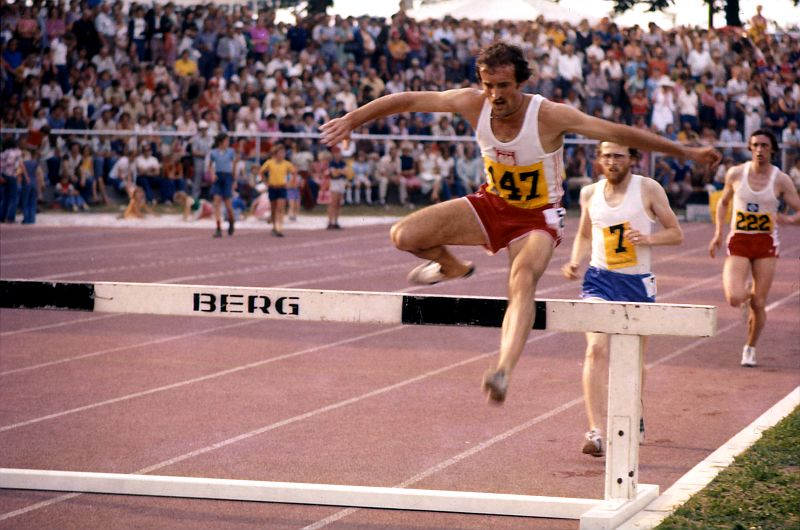
- Bronisław Malinowski during competitions in Fürth in preparations for the 1976 Olympic Summer Games

Personal information
- Born: 4 June 1951 Nowe, Polish People's Republic
- Died: 27 September 1981 (aged 30) Grudziądz, Polish People's Republic
- Height: 1.82 m (6 ft 0 in)
- Weight: 68 kg (150 lb)

Sport
- Sport: Running
- Event: 3000 metres steeplechase
- Club: Olimpia Grudziądz
Medal record
Men's athletics
Representing Poland
Olympic Games
Gold medal – first place	1980 Moscow	3000 m s'chase
Silver medal – second place	1976 Montreal	3000 m s'chase
World Cross Country Championships
Silver medal – second place	1979 Limerick	Long Race
European Championships
Gold medal – first place	1974 Rome	3000 m s'chase
Gold medal – first place	1978 Prague	3000 m s'chase
Summer Universiade
Gold medal – first place	1975 Rome	3000 m s'chase
European Junior Championships
Gold medal – first place	1970 Paris	2000 m s'chase

Bronisław Malinowski (Polish pronunciation: [brɔˈɲiswaf maliˈnɔfskʲi]; 4 June 1951 – 27 September 1981) was a Polish track and field athlete, who is best known for winning a gold medal in the 3000 m steeplechase race during the 1980 Summer Olympics held in Moscow, Soviet Union and the silver four years earlier in Montreal. One year after his last Olympic appearance, Malinowski was killed in a car accident in Grudziądz, at the age of 30.

== Life and career ==
Malinowski was born in Nowe to a Polish father Anastazy Malinowski, and a Scottish mother, Irene Malinowska (née Dowell). He was named after the famous anthropologist. Throughout most of his career he competed for Olimpia Grudziądz. His first international medal was the 2000 metres steeplechase gold at the 1970 European Junior Championships. In his first major senior competition, the 1971 European Championships, he broke the national 5000 metres record which was enough for the eighth place.

He finished fourth at the 1972 Summer Olympics in Munich, Germany, but came back to win gold at the 1974 European Championships. The period between the European Championships and the 1976 Summer Olympics, saw a rivalry emerge between Malinowski and Swedish athlete Anders Gärderud. It ended with Malinowski taking silver behind the first-place Gärderud who won in a world-record time.

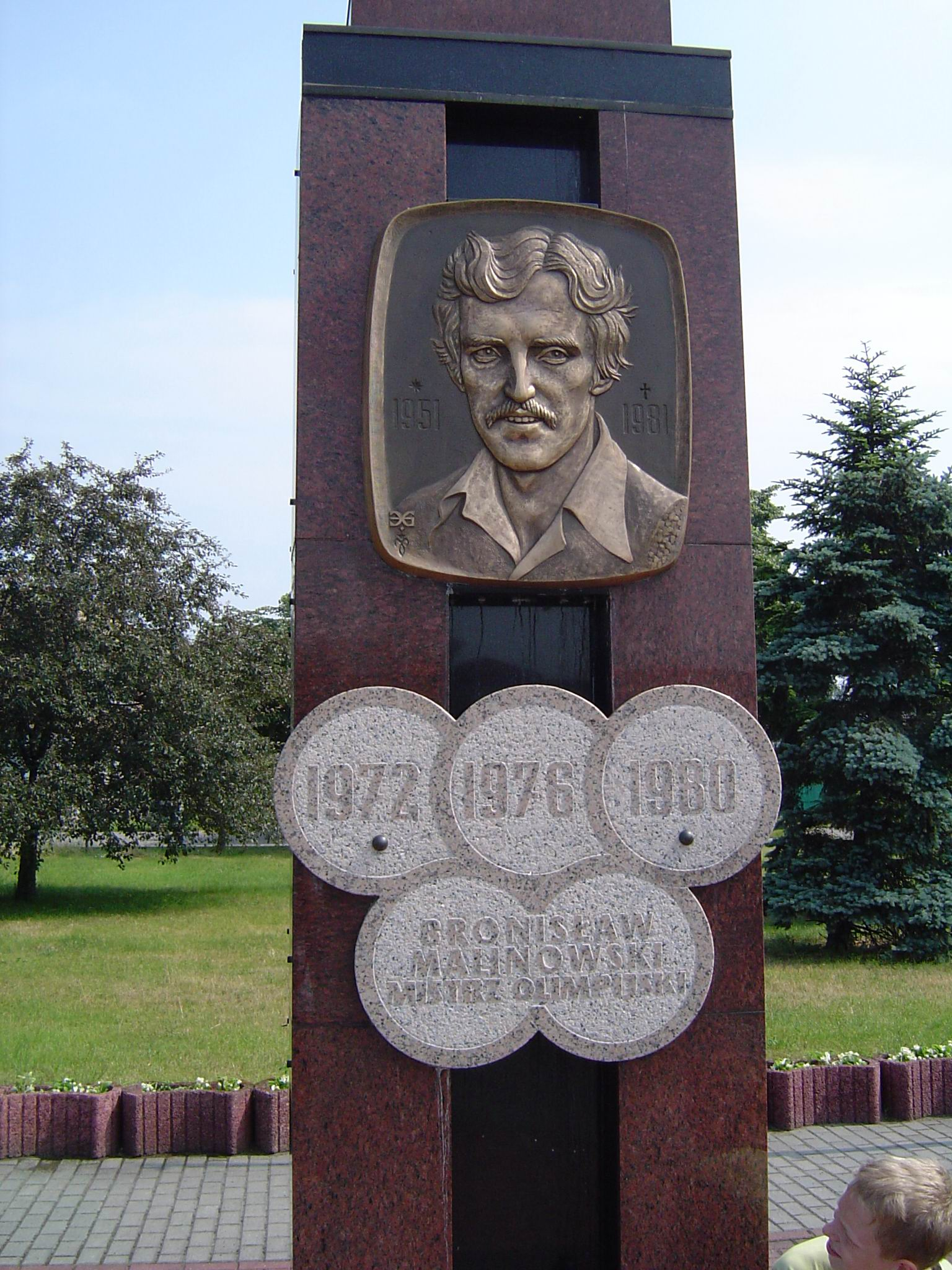
Memorial to Malinowski in front of the Grudziądz stadium.

Although Gärderud retired from the sport in 1976, Malinowski faced a new contender, Henry Rono of Kenya, who set the new world record in 1978. Still, Malinowski beat Rono in a head-to-head race that same season. In the autumn of 1978, he successfully defended his European Championship in the 3000 metres steeplechase in Prague. The pinnacle of Malinowski's career came during the 1980 Summer Olympics when he took gold in the 3000 m steeplechase race by steadying himself against front-runner Filbert Bayi.

Shortly before his death, Malinowski was considering moving to Scotland, the native country of his mother, because Poland was then politically restless. He died in a car crash on 27 September 1981 on a bridge in Grudziądz, which was later named after him. There is also an annual running competition held in his honour in that city, the International Bronisław Malinowski Run.

== Competition record ==
Representing Poland
Year	Competition	Venue	Position	Event	Notes
1970	European Junior Championships	Paris, France	1st	2000 m s'chase	5:44.00
1971	European Championships	Helsinki, Finland	8th	5000 m	13:39.4 (NR)
1972	Olympic Games	Munich, West Germany	26th (h)	5000 m	13:48.2
1972	Olympic Games	Munich, West Germany	4th	3000 m s'chase	8:27.92
1973	European Indoor Championships	Rotterdam, Netherlands	8th	3000 m	8:07.08
1974	European Championships	Rome, Italy	1st	3000 m s'chase	8:15.04
1975	Universiade	Rome, Italy	1st	3000 m s'chase	8:22.32
1976	Olympic Games	Montreal, Canada	20th (h)	1500 m	3:41.67
1976	Olympic Games	Montreal, Canada	2nd	3000 m s'chase	8:09.11 (NR)
1977	Universiade	Sofia, Bulgaria	4th	3000 m s'chase	8:30.8
1978	European Championships	Prague, Czechoslovakia	1st	3000 m s'chase	8:15.08
1979	World Cross Country Championships	Limerick, Ireland	2nd	Senior race	
1980	Olympic Games	Moscow, Soviet Union	1st	3000 m s'chase	8:09.70
1981	Pacific Conference Games	Christchurch, New Zealand	1st	3000 m s'chase	8:24.02

== Personal bests ==
- 1500 metres – 3:37.42 (Warsaw 1978)
- Mile – 3:55.40 (Stockholm 1976)
- 3000 metres – 7:42.4h (Oslo 1974) NR
  - 3000 metres indoor – 7:55.73 (Rotterdam 1973)
- 5000 metres – 13:17.69 (Stockholm 1976) NR
- 10,000 metres – 28:25.19 (Augsburg 1974)
- 3000 m steeplechase – 8:09.11 (Montreal 1976) NR

Records
Preceded by (Soviet Union) Vladimir Dudin	Men's 3000 m steeplechase European record holder equalled Vladimir Dudin's 8:22.2 mark 10 August 1972 – 14 September 1972	Succeeded by (Sweden) Anders Gärderud
Sporting positions
Preceded by (Kenya) Henry Rono	Men's 3000 m steeplechase best year performance 1980	Succeeded by (Italy) Mariano Scartezzini
