= Serhiy Olizarenko =

Soviet middle-distance runner (1954–2024)

Personal information
- Nationality: Ukrainian
- Born: 9 September 1954 Dolynska, Kirovohrad Oblast, Ukrainian SSR, USSR
- Died: 18 December 2024 (aged 70) Odesa, Ukraine
- Height: 174 cm (5 ft 9 in)
- Weight: 60 kg (132 lb)

Sport
- Sport: Middle-distance running
- Event: Steeplechase

Achievements and titles
- Personal best: 8:24.0 (1978)

Serhiy Oleksiyovich Olizarenko (Ukrainian: Сергій Олексійович Олізаренко; 9 September 1954 – 18 December 2024) was a Ukrainian steeplechase runner. He represented the Soviet Union at the 1980 Summer Olympics, but failed to reach the final.

== Biography ==
Olizarenko was born in Kirovohrad Oblast, Ukrainian SSR on 9 September 1954, and in 1968 moved to Odessa. At the 1980 Olympic semi-final he tore an Achilles tendon and had to abandon the race. After that he had two surgeries, but failed to recover and retired from competition.

In 1978 Olizarenko met the middle-distance runner Nadezhda Mushta. They married the same year, and had a daughter Oksana born soon after the 1980 Olympics.

Olizarenko died in Odessa, Ukraine on 18 December 2024, at the age of 70.
