= Benjamin Kogo =

Kenyan steeplechase runner (1944–2022)

Olympic medal record

Men's athletics
Silver medal – second place	1968 Mexico City	3000 m steeplechase

Benjamin Kogo (30 November 1944 – 20 January 2022) was a Kenyan athlete who specialised in 3000 metre steeplechase running.

Kogo was born on 30 November 1944. He was from Arwos, Nandi County, Kenya.

He became the first Kenyan to run steeplechase event in Olympics, was a silver medalist from 1968 Summer Olympics, in an event won by his compatriot Amos Biwott. At the 1964 Summer Olympics he failed to make the final at steeplechase. He won gold at the first All-Africa Games held in 1965 in Brazzaville. Kogo was also bronze medalist from the 1966 British Empire and Commonwealth Games.

Kogo died on 20 January 2022, at the age of 77. He had been diagnosed with prostate cancer one year prior.
