= Steve Savage =

American athlete

Personal information
- Full name: Stephen Read Savage
- Nationality: American
- Born: June 6, 1948 (age 78)

Sport
- Sport: Middle-distance running
- Event: Steeplechase

Stephen Read Savage (born June 6, 1948) is an American middle-distance runner. He competed in the men's 3000 metres steeplechase at the 1972 Summer Olympics.

Savage was an All-American runner for the Oregon Ducks track and field team.
