= Anthony Manning (educator) =

British educationalist and higher education leader

Anthony Manning

Anthony Manning is a British educationalist, author and higher education leader specialising in internationalisation, lifelong learning, English for Academic Purposes and internationalisation at home. He is Associate Dean (International) at Arden University. He was previously Dean for Global and Lifelong Learning at the University of Kent, where his work included international programmes, internationalised student experience, work-based learning and degree apprenticeships.

Manning is a National Teaching Fellow and a Principal Fellow of AdvanceHE's Higher Education Academy (PFHEA). He has served as a trustee of the British Accreditation Council and Chair of its Accreditation Committee. He is also a member of the EAIE Professional Development Committee. The British Council lists Manning as a current member of its English Language Advisory Group, an advisory body that supports the organisation's work in English language education and policy.

== Education ==
Manning studied French and German at Lancaster University and later completed postgraduate study in education and applied linguistics. He holds a Doctor of Education from the University of Leicester, where his doctoral research focused on assessment literacy for teachers of English for Academic Purposes.

== Career ==
Manning worked at the University of Reading before joining the University of Kent. At Kent, he held senior roles including Dean for Internationalisation and Dean for Global and Lifelong Learning. The British Council describes his Kent role as covering English for Academic Purposes, international pathways to higher education, apprenticeships and online learning.

In 2025, Manning was appointed Associate Dean (International) at Arden University. The PIE News reported that the role involved advancing the academic dimensions of the university's international strategy, including transnational education, academic partnerships and internationalised student experience.

== Internationalisation at home ==
Manning has been active in the development of internationalisation at home in UK higher education. The University of Kent described his National Teaching Fellowship as recognising work in international higher education and lifelong learning, including initiatives to internationalise the curriculum and raise the profile of internationalisation at home.

The Universities UK International (UUKi) Internationalisation at Home working group has described Manning as its chair. He led the development of the open-access Internationalisation at Home Handbook, published by Universities UK International in 2024 as a resource for higher education practitioners seeking to embed international and intercultural learning opportunities within the student experience.

In 2023, Manning was a co-author of the International Higher Education Commission report Is the UK Developing Global Mindsets?, which argued that internationalisation at home should play a central role in future UK higher education strategy and graduate development.

In 2024, The PIE News reported on the Innovations in Internationalisation at Home Forum in London, quoting Manning on the challenge of measuring internationalisation at home activity and on the small proportion of UK students who benefit from overseas educational opportunities.

A 2025 article on the SEDA blog, co-authored by Manning with Silvia Colaiacomo and Emma Marku, stated that the Universities UK International working group on internationalisation at home had been active since 2019 and aimed to develop a community of practice across the sector.

== Publications ==
Manning has written and edited work on internationalisation, English for Academic Purposes and academic skills. His books and edited volumes include Innovations in Internationalisation at Home, co-edited with Silvia Colaiacomo, published by Cambridge Scholars Publishing in 2021. The publisher describes the volume as bringing together work on internationalisation at home and curriculum internationalisation in the UK and internationally.

Other works listed in Manning's publication record include Assessing EAP: Theory and Practice in Assessment Literacy (2016), English for Language and Linguistics in Higher Education Studies (2015), Cambridge Academic English B1+ Intermediate Teacher's Book (2012), contributions to the Transferable Academic Skills Kit series, and chapters on international pathway programmes and transnational education.

Manning's book Assessing EAP: Theory and Practice in Assessment Literacy has been reviewed in the academic literature. Writing in the Journal of English for Academic Purposes, Lyndon Taylor described the volume as a useful contribution to discussions of assessment literacy within English for Academic Purposes teaching and learning.

== Awards and recognition ==
Manning was awarded a National Teaching Fellowship in 2021. The University of Kent reported that he was one of 55 new National Teaching Fellows that year and described the National Teaching Fellowship Scheme as a leading teaching award in higher education. Advance HE notes that the award recognised his contributions to international higher education, curriculum internationalisation and lifelong learning.

He is also a Principal Fellow of Advance HE.

In 2018, Manning was shortlisted in the Outstanding Contribution to the Industry category of the PIEoneer Awards. The University of Kent reported that he was one of three finalists in the category and the only UK individual shortlisted.

== Governance and advisory roles ==
Manning has been a trustee of the British Accreditation Council since April 2020 and Chair of its Accreditation Committee. The British Council lists him as a member of its English Language Advisory Group. The PIE News has also reported that he has served as an expert committee member for the EAIE, NCUK and the British Council.

== Selected works ==
- Manning, Anthony and Colaiacomo, Silvia, eds. (2021). Innovations in Internationalisation at Home. Cambridge Scholars Publishing. ISBN 978-1-5275-6656-9.
- Manning, Anthony (2016). Assessing EAP: Theory and Practice in Assessment Literacy. Garnet Education.
- Manning, Anthony (2015). English for Language and Linguistics in Higher Education Studies. Garnet Education.
- Manning, Anthony et al. Transferable Academic Skills Kit. Garnet Education.
- Sowton, Chris; Thaine, Craig; Manning, Anthony (2012). Cambridge Academic English B1+ Intermediate Teacher's Book. Cambridge University Press.
