= David Bedford (runner) =

English long-distance runner

Dave Bedford
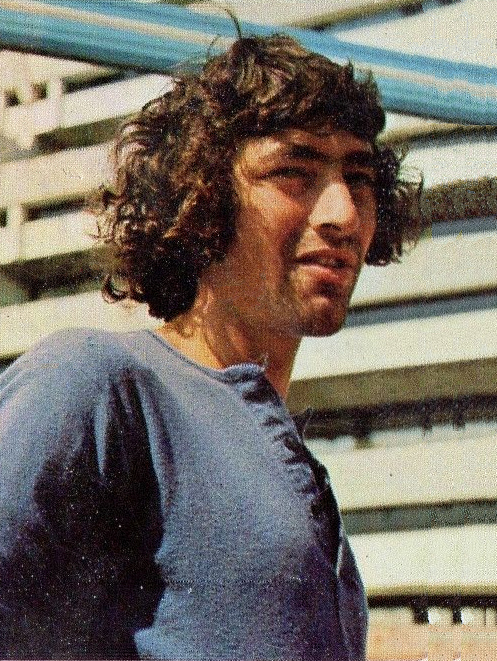
- David Bedford in 1972

Personal information
- Born: 30 December 1949 (age 76) London, England
- Height: 1.83 m (6 ft 0 in)
- Weight: 66 kg (146 lb)

Sport
- Sport: Athletics
- Events: 5000 m, 10,000 m
- Club: Shaftesbury Barnet Harriers

Achievements and titles
- Personal bests: 5000 m – 13:17.21 (1972); 10,000 m – 27:30.80 (1973)

David Colin Bedford OBE (born 30 December 1949) is an English former long-distance runner, whose athletic career spanned the early 1970s. Post-retirement, he served as race director of the London Marathon until 2012, and is the Chairman of the IAAF Road Running Commission (since 2012), as well as sitting on the IAAF Cross Country Committee as the UK Athletics elected representative.

Bedford held the 10,000 metres world record, improving it by 7.6 seconds with his time of 27 minutes 30.80 seconds in 1973. He also held the British records for 3000 m steeplechase and 5000 metres. He usually ran in distinctive red socks, which combined with his distinctive moustache later led to a well publicised dispute about the use of similarly attired runners in advertisements.

== Athletic career ==
Bedford was born in London. In the 1960s, at Whitefield school, in Barnet, he used to train during his lunch hours, running up to Golders Hill park and back. It was at Whitefield he was entered in the Inter-counties Orienteering competition. He came in second. He was a leading distance runner during the 1970s. Indeed, he still remains, after more than 50 years, the last Englishman to have won the International Cross Country Championships (later the World Cross Country Championships) in 1971. However, his greatest achievements were largely against the clock. Despite setting a European record of 27:47.0 on 10 July 1971 at Portsmouth, by a margin of 17 seconds over Jurgen Hasse's record, he suffered in championships due to his lack of a fast final lap. He led for lap after lap in the 1971 European 10,000 m final but still the pack swept past him. He finished sixth to the Flying Finn Juha Väätäinen, who won in a last lap sprint against East Germany's Jürgen Haase. He came twelfth in the 5000 m and sixth in the 10,000 m at the 1972 Munich Olympics.

He represented England at the 1974 British Commonwealth Games in Christchurch, New Zealand, finishing fourth.

Bedford was a five-times British 10,000 metres champion after first winning the British AAA Championships at the 1970 AAA Championships and then winning the title every year from 1971 to 1974.

His later career was hampered by injuries, principally achilles tendonitis, believed to have been caused by his high training mileage. He never ran the great marathon of which many fans thought him capable. He did run the first London Marathon in 1981 but only as the result of a bet. He had been in a nightclub the previous night where David Coleman had remarked on how unwell he looked. Having consumed a curry on the way home from the nightclub, Bedford completed the impromptu marathon but was pictured vomiting at the roadside part way through. However, later in the same year he did manage to win the London Cross Country title at the age of 31.

== Post-retirement ==
In 2003, Bedford was involved in a legal dispute over the alleged portrayal of his image by the directory enquiries company The Number for its 118 118 service. The company had used a pair of athletes wearing red socks and Bedford's distinctive moustache and hair cut. He was quoted as saying, "The bastards! You can use that word and say I said it. [They] used my image then said they had never heard of me. When they were told they couldn't use it any more they said 'Oh no it was all a big misunderstanding'. To get to that stage took £60,000 in legal fees."

In January 2004, Ofcom's Content Board ruled that The Number had breached rule 6.5 of the Advertising Standards Code, by caricaturing him without permission. However, it declined to issue an order banning advertisements in question on the grounds that a ban would be disproportionately damaging to The Number compared with any harm to the feelings or reputation of David Bedford suffered as a result of the advertisements.

In 2004, Bedford crashed the launch of a new 118 118 TV ad campaign. Photos of Bedford being removed made the covers of The Times and Financial Times.

Bedford was president of the Road Runners Club from 2003 to 2006.

Bedford now hosts the Radlett Rotary Fun Run every year.

In 2011 Bedford received an honorary doctorate from Middlesex University.

Runner's World described Bedford as "a key architect" of the 2012 Olympic Marathon Course.

Bedford was appointed Officer of the Order of the British Empire (OBE) in the 2014 New Year Honours for services to athletics and charitable fundraising.

Records
Preceded by Lasse Virén	Men's 10,000 m World Record Holder; 13 July 1973 – 30 June 1977	Succeeded by Samson Kimobwa
Sporting positions
Preceded by Ian Stewart	Men's 5,000 m Best Year Performance; 1971	Succeeded by Emiel Puttemans
