= Bánov, Slovakia =

Village and municipality in Slovakia

Bánov Bánkeszi
- Municipality
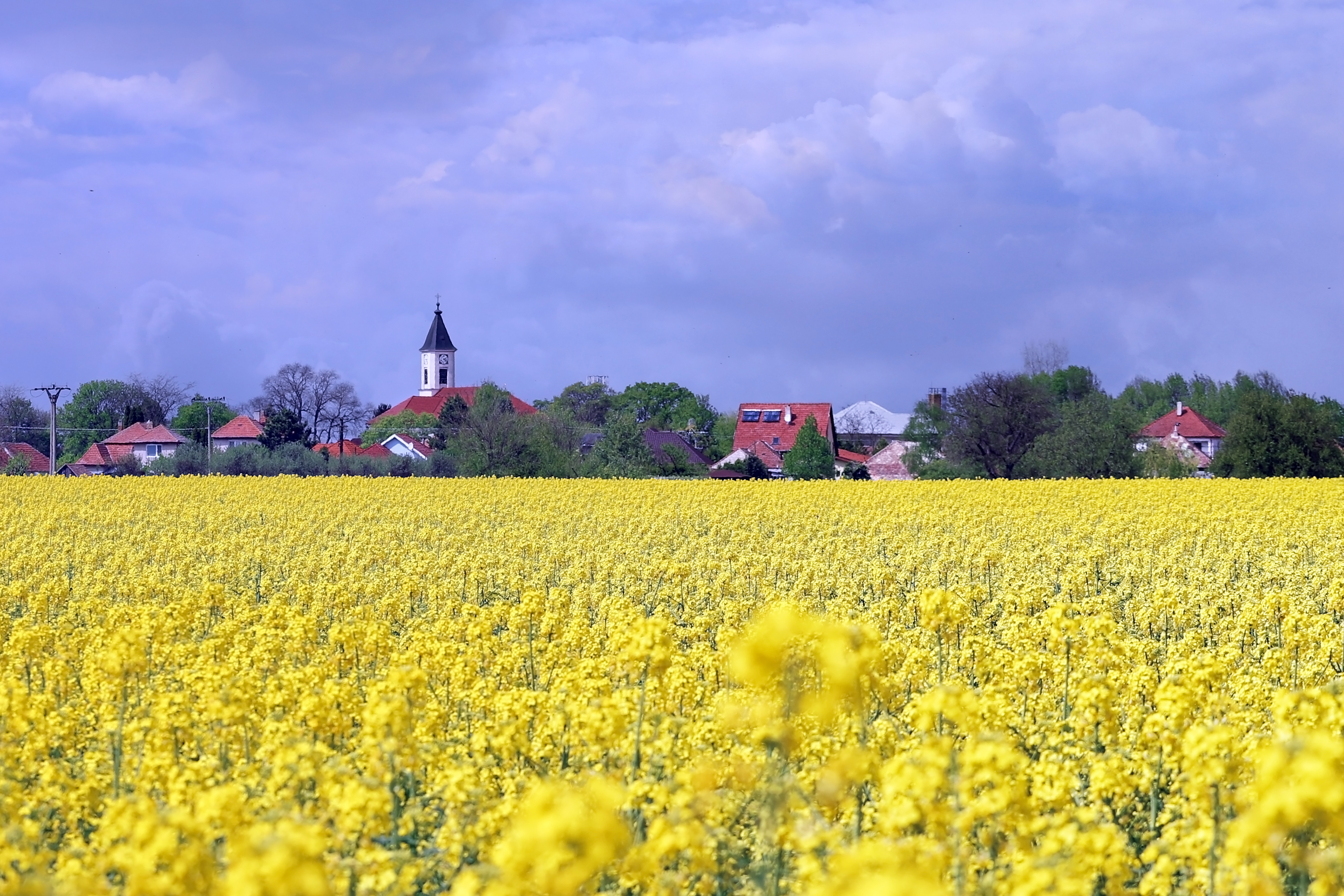

- Flag

- Location of Bánov in the Nitra Region Location of Bánov in Slovakia
- Coordinates: 48.05°N 18.20°E
- Country: Slovakia
- Region: Nitra Region
- District: Nové Zámky District
- First mentioned: 1113

Area
  - Total: 19.76 km^{2} (7.63 sq mi)
- Elevation: 121 m (397 ft)

Population (2025)
  - Total: 3,515
- Time zone: UTC+1 (CET)
  - Summer (DST): UTC+2 (CEST)
- Postal code: 941 01
- Area code: +421 35
- Vehicle registration plate (until 2022): NZ
- Website: www.banov.sk

Bánov (Hungarian: Bánkeszi) is a municipality and village in the Nové Zámky District in the Nitra Region of south-west Slovakia.

== History ==
In historical records the village was first mentioned in 1113.

== Geography ==
The municipality lies at an altitude of 121 metres (397 ft) and covers an area of 19.76 km^{2} (7.63 sq mi) (2025).

== Population ==
Population statistic (10 years)
Year	1995	2005	2015	2025
Count	3760	3745	3726	3515
Difference		−0.39%	−0.50%	−5.66%

Population statistic
Year	2024	2025
Count	3548	3515
Difference		−0.93%

It has a population of 3515 people (31 December 2025).

=== Ethnicity ===
Census 2021 (1+ %)
Ethnicity	Number	Fraction
Slovak	3433	92.85%
Not found out	216	5.84%
Hungarian	49	1.32%
Total	3697	

In year 2021 was 3697 people by ethnicity 3433 as Slovak, 216 as Not found out, 49 as Hungarian, 19 as Other, 17 as Czech, 5 as Romani, 4 as Greek, 3 as Russian, 1 as Irish, 1 as Italian, 1 as Serbian, 1 as Rusyn, 1 as Romanian, 1 as Polish, 1 as German and 1 as Croatian.

Note on population: The difference values of population numbers in the table "Population statistic" and in the sections "Ethnicity" & "Religion" is caused by the use of various statistical methods.

=== Religion ===
Census 2021 (1+ %)
Religion	Number	Fraction
Roman Catholic Church	2643	71.49%
None	730	19.75%
Not found out	224	6.06%
Total	3697	

In year 2021 was 3697 people by religion 2643 from Roman Catholic Church, 730 from None, 224 from Not found out, 22 from Evangelical Church, 20 from Greek Catholic Church, 16 from Ad hoc movements, 11 from Christian Congregations in Slovakia, 7 from Apostolic Church, 4 from Other, 3 from Calvinist Church, 3 from Eastern Orthodox Church, 3 from Paganism and natural spirituality, 3 from Other and not ascertained christian church, 3 from Hinduism, 2 from Jehovah's Witnesses, 2 from Buddhism and 1 from Jewish community.

== Facilities ==
The village has a public library, a DVD rental store and a cinema. It also has a gym and football pitch.

== Genealogical resources ==
The records for genealogical research are available at the state archive in Nitra (Slovak: Štátny archív v Nitre).

- Roman Catholic church records (births/marriages/deaths): 1787-1895 (parish B)

== See also ==
- List of municipalities and towns in Slovakia
