= Tony Manning =

Australian steeplechase runner

Medal record

Representing Australia

Commonwealth Games
Gold medal – first place	1970 Edinburgh	3000 m s'chase

Tony Manning (born 9 January 1943) is a former track and field athlete from Coolah in New South Wales, Australia, who competed in the middle-distance running events. He was born in New South Wales.

At the 1970 Commonwealth Games, Manning won the gold medal ahead of Ben Jipcho and Amos Biwott of Kenya after an eventful race in which his teammate Kerry O'Brien fell at the second last water-jump, while leading, and failed to finish the race. In interviews afterwards he stated that his race plan was to stick close to Kerry O’Brien, who had a steady style and good pace judgment, and decided to "go for it" when O’Brien fell.

Controversially, he was not selected for the 1968 Olympics. A tumour operation prevented his participation in the 1972 Olympics.

Other achievements include victory over Kerry O’Brien and Ron Clarke in the 5,000m at the 1970 Australian Championship in 13–56. He won nine consecutive New South Wales state steeplechase championships. With his brother Peter, later a successful junior middle/long-distance running coach in Coolah, he dead-heated in the 10,000 state cross-country championship and a fortnight later beat Bob Vagg over ten miles at Randwick racecourse, running on bare feet, an unofficial Australian record at the time. He was described by fellow-athlete Ron Clarke as "the original and perhaps the only remaining Australian bushwhacker". He travelled six hours twice a week from his home in Coolah to train and compete for Randwick Botany Harriers in the eastern suburbs of Sydney.

In 2002 he was listed at number seven in the top ten athletes in the history of New South Wales athletics for his Commonwealth Gold and achievement in having run 8.38 for the steeplechase on a cinders track in a state championship race in 1970. His 3:43.1 in the 1500 metres interclub final in 1970 and 13:55.8 in the 5000 metres stood as records for over 30 years, as did his all-comers record in Papua New Guinea.

He married, had four children, and worked for 47 years for Australia Post.

He is brother of Kevin Manning (born 2 November 1933), who was Bishop of Parramatta, a suffragan diocese of the Roman Catholic Archdiocese of Sydney from 1997 to 2010.

== International competitions ==
Year	Competition	Venue	Position	Notes
1970	British Commonwealth Games	Edinburgh, Scotland	1st	3,000 m Steeple
