= Henry Rono =

Kenyan track and field athlete (1952–2024)

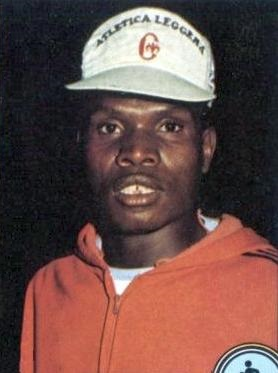
- Rono in 1978

Personal information
- Nationality: Kenyan
- Born: 12 February 1952 Nandi Hills, Colony and Protectorate of Kenya
- Died: 15 February 2024 (aged 72) Nairobi, Kenya

Sport
- Sport: Track
- Event: Long-distance running
- College team: Washington State

Achievements and titles
- Personal bests: Indoor Mile: 3:59.2 (Pullman 1977); 3000 m: 7:32.1 (Oslo 1978); 3000 m steeple: 8:05.4 (Seattle 1978); 2-Mile: 8:14.66 (London 1978); 5000 m: 13:06.20 (Knarvik 1981); 10,000 m: 27:22.47 (Vienna 1978)
Medal record
Men's athletics
Representing Kenya
All-Africa Games
Gold medal – first place	1978 Algiers	10000 m
Gold medal – first place	1978 Algiers	3000 m steeplechase
Commonwealth Games
Gold medal – first place	1978 Edmonton	5000 m
Gold medal – first place	1978 Edmonton	3000 m steeplechase

Henry Rono (12 February 1952 – 15 February 2024) was a Kenyan track and field athlete who specialised in various long-distance running events. Although he never competed at the Olympics, Rono is remembered as one of the most prolific collegiate competitors in the history of track in the United States, as well as being the former record holder for the 3000 metres steeplechase for over a decade. Rono also set the world record for the 5000 metres twice: once in 1978, then again in 1981.

== Early life ==
Rono was born in Nandi Hills, Kenya, into the Nandi tribe.

== Athletics career ==
Rono started running while at primary school. Starting in 1976, he attended college in the U.S. at Washington State University in Pullman, along with his compatriot Samson Kimobwa, who broke the 10,000 m world record in 1977. Rono was mentored on the Palouse by Cougar head coach John Chaplin. More Kenyan runners later enrolled at WSU, including Bernard Lagat, Mike Kosgei, Patrick Muturi, Richard Twuei, and Peter Koech, who won a silver medal in the 3,000 meters Steeplechase at the 1988 Summer Olympics in Seoul.

While at Washington State, Rono became only the third runner in history (after Gerry Lindgren and Steve Prefontaine) to win the NCAA Cross Country Championship three times, in 1976, 1977, and 1979. His winning time of 28:07 in 1976, remains the fastest 10,000 m cross-country time in NCAA history (in 2008 Galen Rupp ran 27:41 at the NCAA regional meet on a course that was said to be 80 m (87 yd) short of the regular measure). He was also NCAA steeplechase champion in 1978 and 1979 and NCAA Indoor Champion in the 3000 m in 1977.

The peak of Rono's running career was the 1978 season. In a span of only 81 days, he broke four world records: 10,000 m (27:22.50), the 5000 m (13:08.40), the 3000 m steeplechase (8:05.40), and the 3000 m (7:32.10); an achievement unparalleled in the history of distance running. He lowered the 10,000 record by almost eight seconds, the 5000 by 4.5, the steeplechase by 2.6, and the 3000 by a full three seconds.

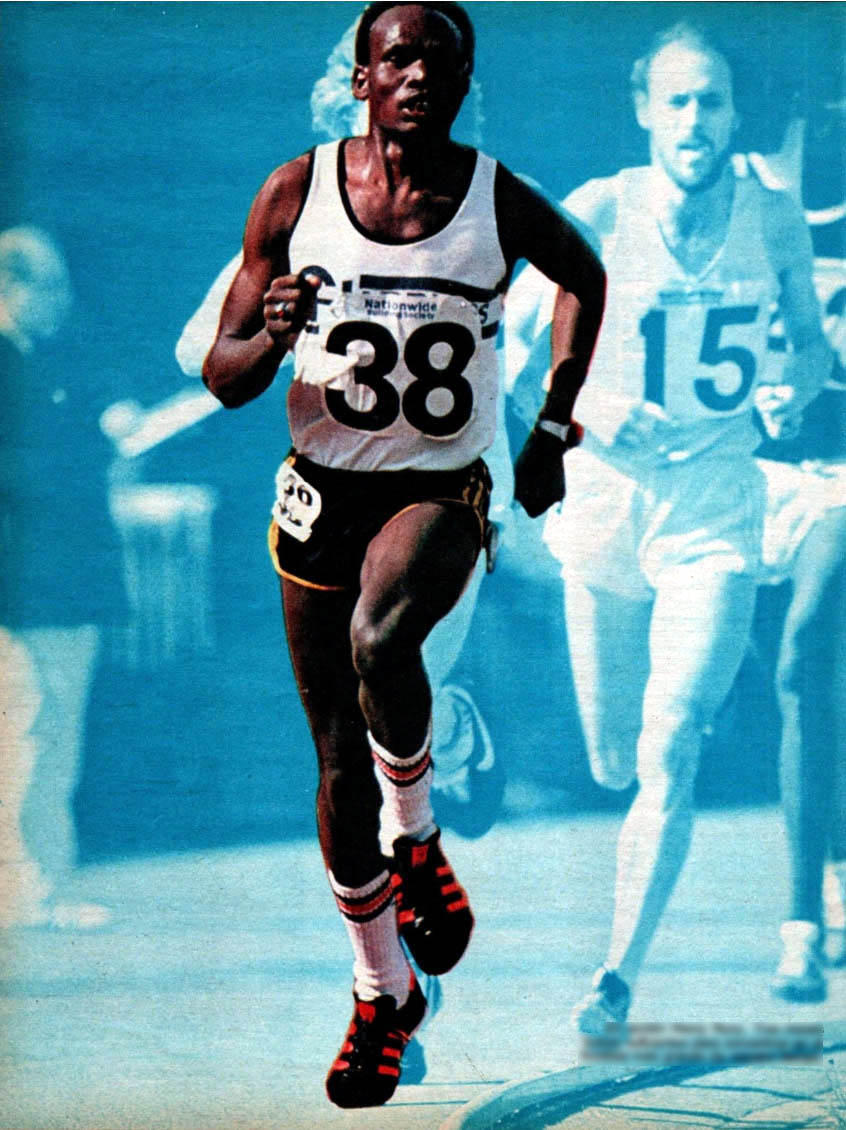
Rono in a phograph from El Gráfico

That August, he also won the 5000 m and 3000 m steeplechase gold medals at the Commonwealth Games in Canada at Edmonton. Among his other performances was a steeplechase / 5000 m double in one day during qualifying at the NCAA championships at the University of Oregon at Eugene's Hayward Field. He set meet records in both events, turning in an 8:18 and 13:22. The former took six seconds off the NCAA meet record for the steeplechase. When he ran the steeplechase final the next day, he won in 8:12.39, taking another six seconds off the steeplechase mark. He won 10,000 m and 3000 m steeplechase gold medals in July at the All-Africa Games.

Although he was never quite as dominant as he was in 1978, Rono continued to run and compete at the same high level for the next four years, running the world's fastest 5000 meters of the year (13:19) and winning the NCAA cross country championships in 1979, running one of history's fastest 10,000 meters races in 1980 (27:31.68), having a strong year in the 5000 meters with several high quality races, including another 5,000 m world record (13:06.20) in 1981, and running history's third fastest 5000 meters (13:08.90) as well as twice running under 27:30 to come within seconds of his world record for 10,000 meters in 1982.

Rono never competed at the Olympics, as his country Kenya boycotted in 1976 and 1980; by 1984, he was no longer competing.

His 3000 m steeplechase world record (8:05.40) stood for eleven years, and, as of 2023, still stands as the collegiate record. His 10,000 meters world record remained the fastest time ever run by an NCAA athlete until Sam Chelanga's 27:08 in 2010 at the Payton Jordan invitational.

After turning 55 in February 2007, it was reported that Rono would attempt to break the world masters mile record for the 55–59 age group. 2007 was also the year Rono's autobiography, Olympic Dream, was published.

== Post-racing career ==
Rono coached high school athletics in Albuquerque, New Mexico, and pursued a graduate degree in special education. He was also co-owner of Turbo Health Care Services and Rhinow Corp.

== Death ==
Rono died after a short illness on 15 February 2024, at the age of 72.

== Personal bests ==
- One mile – 3:59.2 indoors (1977)
- 3000 metres – 7:32.1 (1978)
- 5000 metres – 13:06.20 (1981)
- 10,000 metres – 27:22.47 (1978)
- 3000 metres steeplechase – 8:05.4 (1978)

== Competition record ==
=== NCAA cross country ===
Year	Competition	Venue	Position	Notes
Representing Washington State
1976	NCAA Cross Country Championships	Denton, Texas	1st	28:06.8
1977	NCAA Cross Country Championships	Pullman, Washington	1st	28:33.5
1979	NCAA Cross Country Championships	Bethlehem, Pennsylvania	1st	28:19.6

== See also ==
- List of Washington State University people

Records
Preceded by Brendan Foster	Men's 3000 m world record holder 27 June 1978 – 20 August 1989	Succeeded by Saïd Aouita
Preceded by Dick Quax	Men's 5000 m world record holder 8 April 1978 – 7 July 1982	Succeeded by David Moorcroft
Preceded by Samson Kimobwa	Men's 10,000 m world record holder 11 June 1978 – 2 July 1984	Succeeded by Fernando Mamede
Preceded by Anders Gärderud	Men's 3000 m steeplechase world record holder 13 May 1978 – 3 July 1989	Succeeded by Peter Koech
Awards
Preceded by Alberto Juantorena	United Press International; Athlete of the Year; 1978	Succeeded by Sebastian Coe
Preceded by Alberto Juantorena	Men's Track & Field Athlete of the Year; 1978	Succeeded by Sebastian Coe
Sporting positions
Preceded by Karl Fleschen	Men's 3000 m best year performance 1978	Succeeded by Rudy Chapa
Preceded by Dick Quax; Miruts Yifter	Men's 5000 m best year performance 1978; 1981	Succeeded by Suleiman Nyambui; David Moorcroft
Preceded by Michael Karst	Men's 3000 m steeplechase best year performance 1978–1979	Succeeded by Bronisław Malinowski
