= Mike Roche (runner) =

American middle-distance runner

Personal information
- Full name: Miguel Santiago "Mike" Roche
- Nationality: American
- Born: June 27, 1953 (age 73) San Diego, California, U.S.

Sport
- Sport: Middle-distance running, road racing
- Event: Steeplechase

Miguel Santiago "Mike" Roche (born June 27, 1953) is an American middle-distance runner. He competed in the men's 3000 metres steeplechase at the 1976 Summer Olympics. Roche was a 1975 NCAA All-American in the 3000 steeplechase while attending Rutgers University. He was ranked in the top 10 US Steeplechasers from 1975 to 1980. In 1978, Roche was a member of the silver medal-winning US International Cross Country team competing in Glasgow, Scotland. On July 4, 1978, Roche beat 12,000 runners at the Peachtree Road Race in Atlanta, GA, setting a new course record (28:59) in the process. In March 1981, Roche established a new American Record for 10 miles with a time of 46:57 at Cherry Hill, NJ. The record would stand for 2 years.
