= Wigmar Pedersen =

Danish middle-distance runner (born 1946)

Personal information
- Full name: Wigmar Ingers Edvart Pedersen
- Nationality: Danish
- Born: 9 October 1946 (age 79)

Sport
- Sport: Middle-distance running
- Event: Steeplechase

Wigmar Ingers Edvart Pedersen (born 9 October 1946) is a Danish middle-distance runner. He competed in the men's 3000 metres steeplechase at the 1972 Summer Olympics.
