= Andy Holden (athlete) =

British athlete

Personal information
- Nationality: British (English)
- Born: 22 October 1948 Leyland, Lancashire, England
- Died: 4 January 2014 (aged 65) Dudley, West Midlands, England
- Height: 179 cm (5 ft 10 in)
- Weight: 64 kg (141 lb)

Sport
- Sport: Athletics
- Event: Long-distance running
- Club: Preston Harriers; Tipton Harriers
Medal record
Representing Great Britain
Summer Universiade
Silver medal – second place	1970 Turin	3000m steeplechase

John Andrew Holden (22 October 1948 – 4 January 2014) was an English long-distance runner whose athletic career peaked in the 1970s. His strongest event was the 3000m steeplechase, a discipline at which he represented his country in the 1972 Summer Olympics.

Holden's best performance in the steeplechase was 8:26.4 in September 1972, setting a British record. His time was still in the national all-time top 20 at the time of his death 42 years later. After his track career ended, Holden switched to road racing, where he continued to race in the veteran categories for many years. His best of 28:29 for the 10km road race is a British record for over-35s.

== Early life ==
Holden was raised in the Lancashire town of Leyland, and represented Preston Harriers as a junior, and later Tipton Harriers as a junior and senior, typically in cross country. He attended Preston Catholic College and Bishop Milner Catholic College where he gained 10 O-levels and 4 A-levels.

In 1968, he went to the University of Birmingham to study dentistry. While at university, he won the junior title in the 1969 English Cross Country Championships, beating future world 10,000m record holder Dave Bedford.

== Career ==
Holden's first experience of senior international competition came in 1969, when he was selected for an international cross country meeting in Braaschaat, Belgium. The race finished with a British 1–2–3 in which Holden was second, behind Ron Hill and ahead of Bedford. Two months later, Holden was part of the England team that won the team competition at the 1969 International Cross Country Championships; Holden was placed 24th. On the track, Holden finished third in the 3000m steeplechase in the AAA Championships, but was overlooked in the selections for the 1969 European Championships. His first win in an international meeting came in Verona in August 1969. His time was initially thought to be a British record for the steeplechase, but the course was found to be short when remeasured.

1970 started well for Holden; he won the British University cross country championship for the second year running. In his first major track championship, the 1970 British Commonwealth Games, Holden placed 5th in the 3000m steeplechase. The following month, he won the 1970 AAA Championships title. Holden then won silver in the 3000m steeplechase in the 1970 World Student Games, behind European champion Mikhail Zhelev. As the season drew to a close, Holden faced Kip Keino, the 3000 m world record holder, in a 3000m race at an indoor meeting. Holden raced from the front and pushed the Kenyan hard, but was overtaken in the final 100m.

Holden retained his AAA steeplechase title at the 1971 AAA Championships. A meeting at Crystal Palace in September saw Holden battle Dave Bedford for the British steeplechase record. Holden trailed Bedford by four seconds after three laps, but caught his rival with 800m remaining. Bedford prevailed in a sprint finish, by a margin of 0.2 seconds. Though beaten by Bedford, Holden's time of 8:28.8 was two seconds faster than the previous record, set by Gerry Stevens.

Holden was unable to claim a third successive university cross country title in 1972. Racing only a few weeks after having an appendectomy, he finished second. Holden represented Great Britain in the 3000m steeplechase in the 1972 Summer Olympics, but finished fifth in his heat and was eliminated. At the close of the outdoor track season, at the same meeting he had tussled with Bedford the previous year, Holden set a British record for the 3000m steeplechase. At 8:26.4, the time was 2.2 seconds faster than that set by Bedford.

Throughout his athletic career, Holden remained an amateur. After he qualified as a dentist, Holden settled in the West Midlands, and practised dentistry full-time alongside his athletic activities. He was also known for his ability to remain competitive despite drinking large quantities of alcohol. He is alleged to have drunk ten pints of beer the night before winning the 1979 Bermuda marathon in a course-record time, and he once ran 100 miles (160 km) and drank 100 imperial pints (57 L) of beer in a single week.

In later years, Holden focused on the marathon; his personal best at the distance was 2:15:17, a performance that gave him third place in the 1980 AAA championship. His marathon experience also included the inaugural European Marathon Cup in 1981, in which he finished 26th. His best marathon performance in the AAA championships was second in 1981. He won the 1982 Hong Kong Marathon in a time of 2:17:43. An unusual mishap denied him victory in the 1986 Belfast Marathon, after the lead car twice took a wrong turn, at 7 and 22 miles. The lost time proved crucial; Holden was caught with 400 yards to go and lost by 10 seconds. Holden represented his local club Tipton Harriers, where he also coached, for several decades, and continued to race until the 1990s.

Holden died on 4 January 2014, having suffered health problems since an aortic aneurysm three years before.
