= Mauri Kontu =

Finnish businessman and politician

Member of the Finnish Parliament for Varsinais-Suomi
- Incumbent
- Assumed office 9 September 2025
- Preceded by: Annika Saarikko
- Parliamentary group: Centre Party

Personal details
- Born: Mauri Eino Olavi Kontu; 1952 (age 73–74)
- Party: Centre Party
- Spouse: Sinikka Tyynelä
- Occupation: businessman

Mauri Eino Olavi Kontu (born 1952) is a Finnish businessman and politician currently serving as a member of the Parliament of Finland for the Varsinais-Suomi electoral district, representing the Centre Party.

As a wealthy businessman and a self-funding candidate, Kontu was able to spend 124,809 euros in his campaign in the 2023 Finnish parliamentary election, which was the most expensive campaign by a candidate running for the Centre Party in that election. The 2023 result, 3,468 votes, was insufficient for him to be elected outright. When Annika Saarikko resigned her seat in the fall of 2025, Kontu replaced her in the Finnish Parliament.

In the 1970s Kontu competed in athletics. He married a fellow athlete, Sinikka Tyynelä.
