= Romualdas Bitė =

Lithuanian middle-distance runner (born 1944)

Personal information
- Nationality: Lithuanian
- Born: 3 January 1944 (age 82)

Sport
- Sport: Middle-distance running
- Event: Steeplechase

Romualdas Bitė (born 3 January 1944) is a Lithuanian middle-distance runner. He competed in the men's 3000 metres steeplechase at the 1972 Summer Olympics, representing the Soviet Union.
