= Anders Gärderud =

Swedish athlete (born 1946)

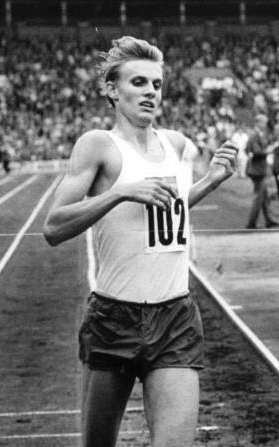
- Anders Gärderud in 1968

Personal information
- Full name: Sven Anders Gärderud
- Nationality: Swedish
- Born: 28 August 1946 (age 79) Degerfors, Sweden
- Height: 1.86 m (6 ft 1 in)
- Weight: 70 kg (154 lb)

Sport
- Country: Sweden
- Sport: Athletics
- Event: 800–5000 m
- Club: KA2 IF, Karlskrona; Enebybergs IF; Mälarhöjdens IK, Stockholm

Achievements and titles
- Personal bests: 800 m – 1:47.2 (1968); 1500 m – 3:36.73 (1974); 5000 m – 13:17.59 (1976); 3000 mS – 8:08.02 (1976); 5000 m – 13:17.59 (1976)
Medal record
Men's athletics
Representing Sweden
Olympic Games
Gold medal – first place	1976 Montreal	3000 m st.
European Championships
Silver medal – second place	1974 Rome	3000 m st.

Sven Anders Gärderud (born 28 August 1946) is a Swedish former track and field athlete, winner of the 3000 m steeplechase event at the 1976 Summer Olympics in Montreal.

Gärderud was born to an orienteering competitor, and was an accomplished orienteer himself, winning a team gold medal at the 1977 Swedish Championships. He initially trained in orienteering and changed sports by chance – he was banned from running in the woods in autumn 1961 due to a jaundice epidemic and wandered into an athletic hall.

Gärderud experimented with several events before focusing on the 3000 m steeplechase. His first major competition were the 1968 Summer Olympics, where he was eliminated in the heats of 800 m and 1500 m. In the following years, Gärderud concentrated on the steeplechase, and was already a main favorite at the 1972 Summer Olympics, but, suffering from a cold, he was eliminated in his heat. Gärderud was also eliminated in the heats of the 5000 m at the Olympics, but only seven days later, he set a new 3000 m steeplechase world record at 8:20.8.

At the 1974 European Championships in Rome, Gärderud was beaten by Bronisław Malinowski of Poland, yet next year he broke the 3000 m steeplechase world record three times.

The culmination of Gärderud's career was at the 1976 Summer Olympics, where after a stirring contest with Malinowski and Frank Baumgartl, Gärderud won the gold medal in a new world record of 8:08.02. His victory in that event would earn him a share of the Svenska Dagbladet Gold Medal with cyclist Bernt Johansson.

After retiring from competitions Gärderud worked as a TV commentator of athletics events and as the head coach of the Swedish athletics team. In 1986 he married Annika Johansson.

== Competition record ==
Year	Competition	Venue	Position	Event	Notes
Representing Sweden
1966	European Indoor Games	Dortmund, West Germany	6th	3000 m	8:12.8
1968	Olympic Games	Mexico City, Mexico	24th (h)	800 m	1:48.9
1968	Olympic Games	Mexico City, Mexico	35th (h)	1500 m	3:54.28
1972	Olympic Games	Munich, West Germany	17th (h)	5000 m	13:57.2
1972	Olympic Games	Munich, West Germany	19th (h)	3000 m s'chase	8:30.8
1974	European Championships	Rome, Italy	2nd	3000 m s'chase	8:15.41
1976	Olympic Games	Montreal, Canada	1st	3000 m s'chase	8:08.02 (WR)

Records
Preceded by Kerry O'Brien	Men's 3000 m steeplechase world record holder 14 September 1972 – 15 January 1973	Succeeded by Ben Jipcho
Preceded by Ben Jipcho	Men's 3000 m steeplechase world record holder 25 June 1975 – 13 May 1978	Succeeded by Henry Rono
Preceded by Vladimir Dudin; Bronisław Malinowski (co-holders)	Men's 3000 m steeplechase European record holder 14 September 1972 – 24 August 1984 shared with Michael Karst; 26 June 1974 – 2 July 1974	Succeeded by Joseph Mahmoud
Preceded by Dan Waern	Men's 800 m Swedish record holder 11 September 1968 – 4 July 1974 shared with Åke Svensson from 13 July 1973	Succeeded by Åke Svensson
Preceded by Bengt Nåjde	Men's 5000 m Swedish record holder 26 July 1972 – 25 July 1973	Succeeded by Bengt Nåjde
Preceded by Bengt Nåjde	Men's 5000 m Swedish record holder 7 August 1973 –	Succeeded by Current holder
Preceded by Bengt Persson	Men's 3000 m steeplechase Swedish record holder 13 August 1971 – 28 July 2007	Succeeded by Mustafa Mohamed
Awards
Preceded by Ingemar Stenmark	Svenska Dagbladet Gold Medal with Bernt Johansson; 1976	Succeeded by Frank Andersson
Sporting positions
Preceded by Kerry O'Brien	Men's 3000 m steeplechase best year performance 1972	Succeeded by Ben Jipcho
Preceded by Ben Jipcho	Men's 3000 m steeplechase best year performance 1974–1976	Succeeded by Michael Karst
