= Paul Copu =

Romanian middle-distance runner

Personal information
- Born: 7 August 1953 (age 72) Mera, Vrancea County, Romania

Sport
- Sport: Track and field
Medal record
Representing Romania
Summer Universiade
Gold medal – first place	1979 Mexico City	3000m steeplechase
Silver medal – second place	1977 Sofia	3000m steeplechase

Paul Copu (born 7 August 1953) is a Romanian former middle distance runner who competed in the 1980 Summer Olympics.
