= Roberto Volpi =

Italian athletics competitor

Personal information
- Nationality: Italian
- Born: 15 August 1952 (age 73) Florence, Italy
- Height: 1.70 m (5 ft 7 in)
- Weight: 68 kg (150 lb)

Sport
- Country: Italy
- Sport: Athletics
- Event(s): 3000 metres steeplechase Long-distance running
- Club: ASSI Giglio Rosso; Fiat Iveco Turin

Achievements and titles
- Personal best: 3000 m st: 8:28.82 (1990)

Roberto Volpi (born 15 August 1952) was an Italian predominantly steeplechase runner who competed at the 1980 Summer Olympics.

== National titles ==
He won four times the national championships at senior level.

- Italian Athletics Championships
  - 3000 m st: 1976, 1977, 1978, 1980
