= Hans-Dieter Schulten =

German middle-distance runner

Personal information
- Nationality: German
- Born: 11 December 1940 (age 85)

Sport
- Sport: Middle-distance running
- Event: Steeplechase

Hans-Dieter Schulten (born 11 December 1940) is a German middle-distance runner. He competed in the men's 3000 metres steeplechase at the 1972 Summer Olympics.
