= Michael Karst =

German athlete

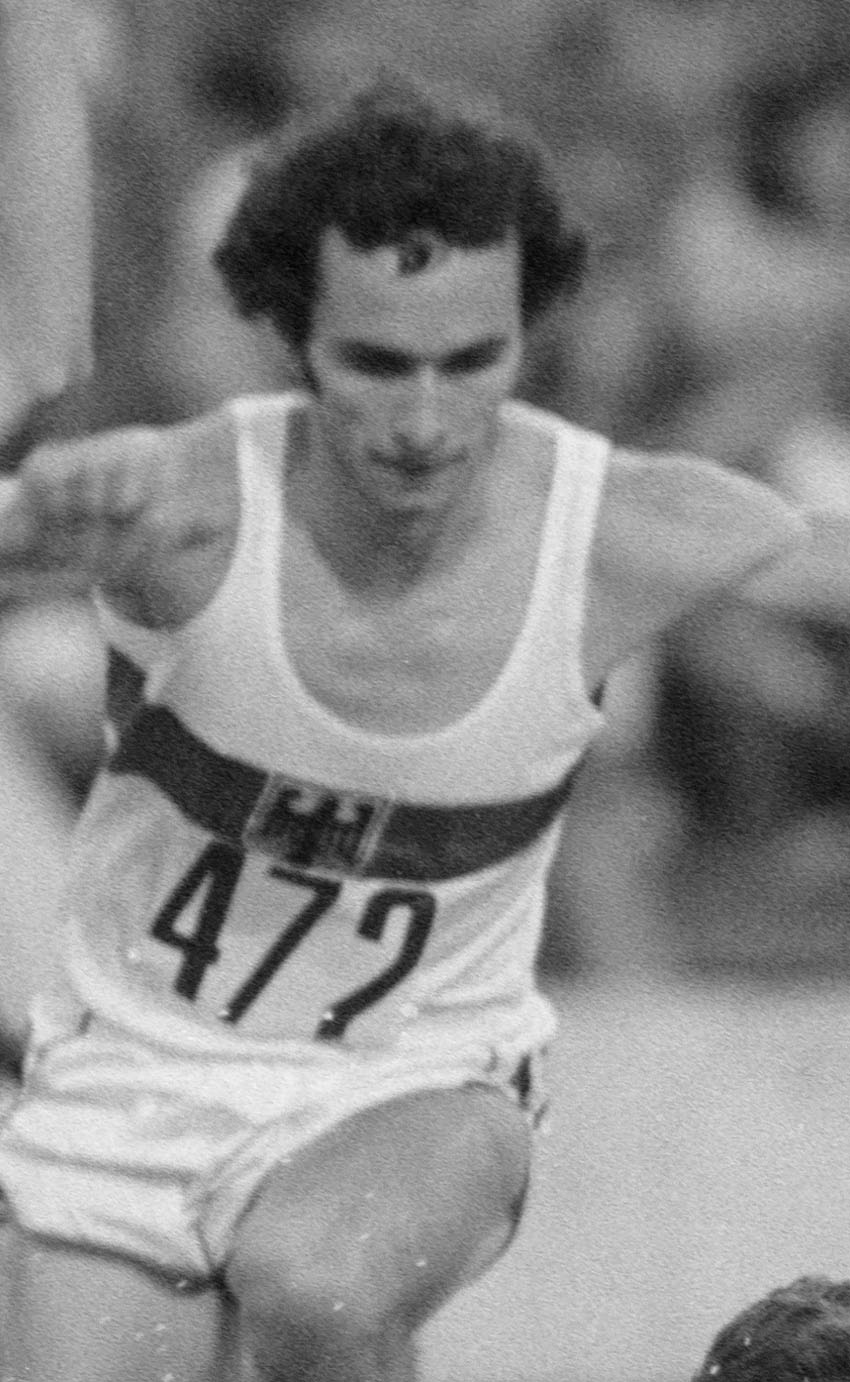
- Karst in 1974

Personal information
- Born: 28 January 1952 (age 74) Mannheim, West Germany
Medal record
Men's athletics
Representing West Germany
European Championships
Bronze medal – third place	1974 Rome	3000 m steeplechase
IAAF World Cup
Gold medal – first place	1977 Düsseldorf	3000 m steeplechase
Summer Universiade
Gold medal – first place	1977 Sofia	3000 m steeplechase
Silver medal – second place	1973 Moscow	3000 m steeplechase
Silver medal – second place	1975 Rome	3000 m steeplechase

Michael Karst (born 28 January 1952) is a retired 3000 m steeplechaser from West Germany.

== Biography ==
He finished fifth at the 1976 Summer Olympics, first at the 1977 World Cup and fourth at the 1978 European Championships. He also won two silver and one gold medal at the Summer Universiades in 1973, 1975 and 1977. At the 1977 European Indoor Championships he finished sixth in 3000 metres.

In June 1974 he set a new European record of 8:18.4 minutes, which he improved to a then-national record of 8:18.0 at the 1974 European Championships where he won the bronze medal. He improved his (West) German record on two occasions in Stockholm, first to 8:16.2 minutes in July 1975 and finally to 8:14.05 minutes in July 1977. This result places him sixth on the German all-time performers list, behind Damian Kallabis, Hagen Melzer, Frank Baumgartl, Rainer Schwarz and Uwe Pflügner.

Karst won five German national titles, in the years 1974-1977 and 1979. He competed for the sports clubs SV Saar 05 Saarbrücken and USC Mainz during his active career.

Records
Preceded by (Sweden) Anders Gärderud	Men's 3000 m steeplechase European record holder equalled Anders Gärderud's 8:18.4 mark 26 June 1974 – 2 July 1974	Succeeded by (Sweden) Anders Gärderud
Sporting positions
Preceded by (Sweden) Anders Gärderud	Men's 3000 m steeplechase best year performance 1977	Succeeded by (Kenya) Henry Rono
