= Toni Feldmann =

Swiss middle-distance runner

Personal information
- Full name: Anton Feldmann
- Nationality: Swiss
- Born: 20 September 1948 (age 77)

Sport
- Sport: Middle-distance running
- Event: Steeplechase

Anton Feldmann (born 20 September 1948) is a Swiss middle-distance runner. He competed in the men's 3000 metres steeplechase at the 1972 Summer Olympics.
