= Gérard Buchheit =

French middle-distance runner

Personal information
- Nationality: French
- Born: 30 September 1948 (age 77) Hagueneau, France

Sport
- Sport: Middle-distance running
- Event: Steeplechase

Gérard Buchheit (born 30 September 1948) is a French middle-distance runner. He competed in the men's 3000 metres steeplechase at the 1972 Summer Olympics.
