= Dan Glans =

Swedish steeplechase runner

Personal information
- Nationality: Swedish
- Born: 2 May 1947 (age 79) Hässleholm, Sweden
- Height: 175 cm (5 ft 9 in)
- Weight: 64 kg (141 lb)

Sport
- Sport: Athletics
- Event: Steeplechase
- Club: IFK Helsingborg

Dan Christer Glans (born 2 May 1947) is a Swedish steeplechase runner. He competed in the men's 3000 metres steeplechase at the 1976 Summer Olympics.

Glans finished third behind John Davies in the 3,000 metres steeplechase event at the British 1974 AAA Championships.
