= Amos Biwott =

Kenyan athlete (born 1947)

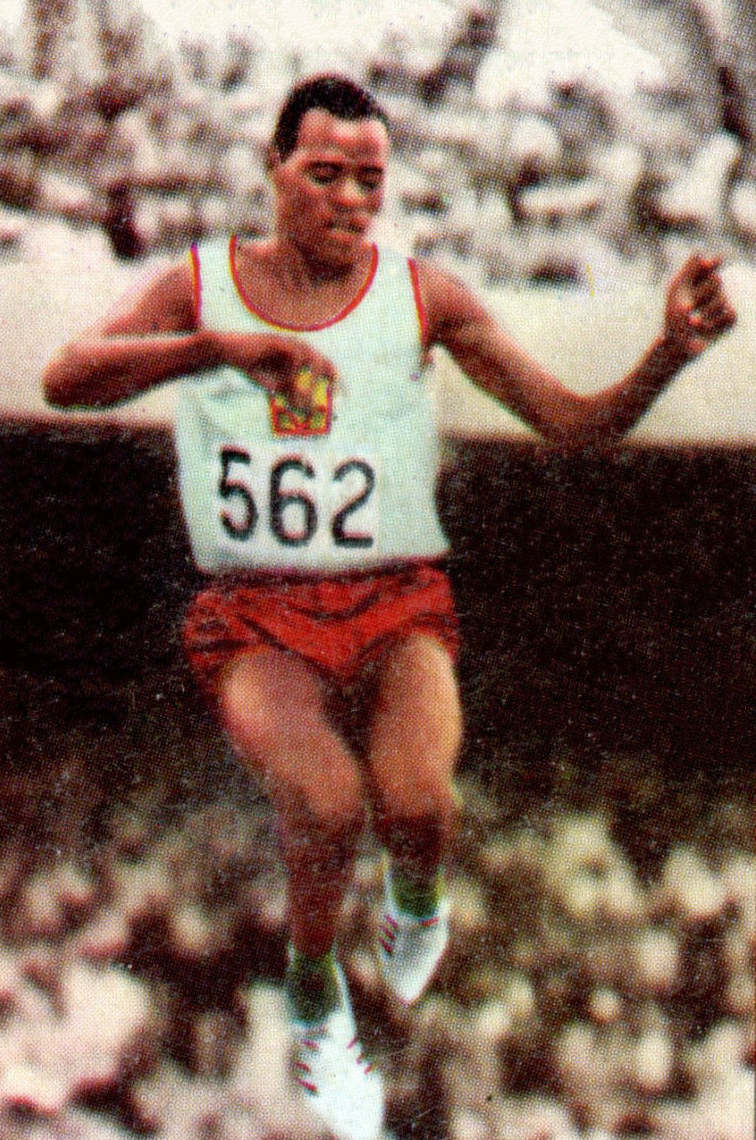

Personal information
- Born: 8 September 1947 (age 78) Nandi, Kenya
- Height: 1.81 m (5 ft 11 in)
- Weight: 66 kg (146 lb)

Sport
- Sport: Athletics
- Event: 3000 m steeplechase

Achievements and titles
- Personal best: 8:23.73 (1972)
Medal record
Representing Kenya
Summer Olympics
Gold medal – first place	1968 Mexico City	3000 m steeplechase

Amos Biwott (born 8 September 1947) is a former Kenyan long-distance runner, winner of the 3000 m steeplechase at the 1968 Summer Olympics.

Biwott was the first of a long line of Kenyan runners who starred in the 3000 m steeplechase since Biwott's surprising win at the 1968 Olympics; he pioneered the black Africa's dominance at the long-distance running. Biwott had only three steeplechase races before the Olympics, and his technique was unorthodox. Instead of placing one foot on the barrier and springing off, he cleared the obstacle in one leap, and in this way reduced the clearance time by half. He was the only runner to finish with completely dry feet in both the Olympic qualifying heat and the final, which he won by 0.6 seconds ahead of compatriot Benjamin Kogo.

Biwott never won an international championship after the 1968 Olympics. He finished third at the 1970 British Commonwealth Games, was sixth at the 1972 Summer Olympics and completed his career with an eighth place at the 1974 British Commonwealth Games. He then worked for the Kenya Prisons Service until 1978, when he was prosecuted for theft. After that he worked as a watchman at a stadium.

Biwott is married to Cherono Maiyo, one of the first Kenyan women to compete at the Summer Olympics. They married in 1973 and have five children.
