= Takaharu Koyama =

Japanese middle-distance runner

Personal information
- Nationality: Japanese
- Born: 8 July 1948
- Died: 11 September 2018 (aged 70)
- Height: 176 cm (5 ft 9 in)
- Weight: 65 kg (143 lb)

Sport
- Sport: Athletics
- Event: steeplechase
Medal record
Men's athletics
Representing Japan
Asian Games
| Gold medal – first place | 1974 Tehran | 3000m steeplechase |
Asian Championships
| Gold medal – first place | 1973 Marikina | 3000 m steeplechase |
Summer Universiade
| Bronze medal – third place | 1970 Turin | 3000m steeplechase |

Takaharu Koyama (小山 隆治, Koyama Takaharu; 8 July 1948 – 11 September 2018) was a Japanese middle distance runner who competed in the 1972 Summer Olympics and in the 1976 Summer Olympics.

Koyama finished second behind John Davies in the 3,000 metres steeplechase event at the British 1974 AAA Championships.
