= Hans Menet =

Swiss middle-distance runner

Personal information
- Nationality: Swiss
- Born: 29 May 1940 (age 85)

Sport
- Sport: Middle-distance running
- Event: Steeplechase

Hans Menet (born 29 May 1940) is a Swiss middle-distance runner. He competed in the 3000 metres steeplechase at the 1968 Summer Olympics and the 1972 Summer Olympics.
