= Gerald Stevens =

English runner (born 1941)

Personal information
- Nationality: British (English)
- Born: 23 May 1941 (age 85) Reading, England

Sport
- Sport: Athletics
- Event: 3,000m steeplechase
- Club: Reading AC

Gerald Richard Stevens (born 23 May 1941), is a male former athlete who competed for England.

== Biography ==
Stevens was a member of the Reading Athletic Club and was selected by England to represent his country in athletics events. He won a silver medal and two bronze medals at the AAA National championships.

He represented the England team in the 3,000 metres steeplechase, at the 1966 British Empire and Commonwealth Games in Kingston, Jamaica.

Four years later he competed in the same event at the 1970 British Commonwealth Games in Edinburgh, Scotland.

On 1 September 1969, he set a British record of 8:30.8.
