= Paul Thys =

Belgian athlete

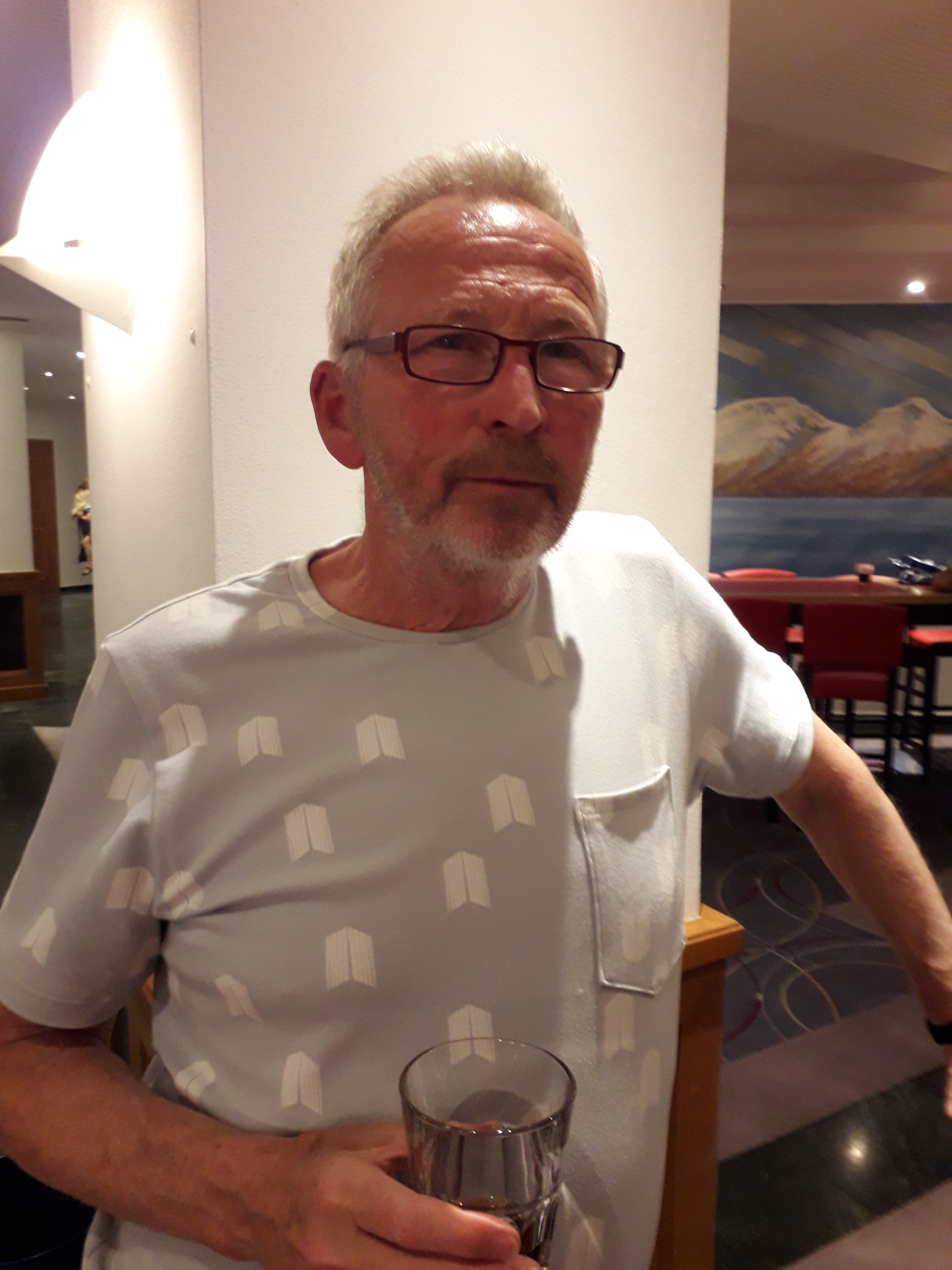

Personal information
- Nationality: Belgian
- Born: 2 May 1946 (age 80)

Sport
- Sport: Middle-distance running
- Event: Steeplechase
Medal record
Men's athletics
Representing Belgium
European Indoor Championships
Silver medal – second place	1974 Gothenburg	3000 m

Paul Thys (born 2 May 1946) is a Belgian middle-distance runner. He competed in the 3000 metres steeplechase at the 1972 Summer Olympics and the 1976 Summer Olympics.
