= Jean-Paul Villain =

French athlete

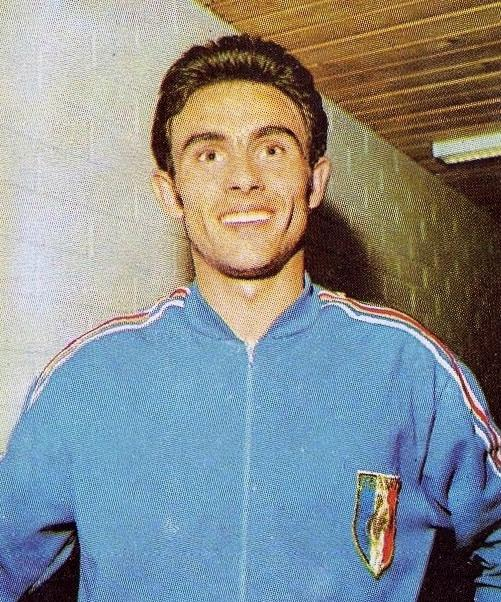

Personal information
- Born: 1 November 1946 (age 79) Dieppe, France
- Height: 170 cm (5 ft 7 in)
- Weight: 52 kg (115 lb)

Sport
- Sport: Athletics
- Event: steeplechase
- Club: Stade Dieppe; Individuel Haute Normandie

Achievements and titles
- Personal best: 8:25.12 (1971)
Medal record
Men's athletics
Representing France
European Championships
Gold medal – first place	1971 Helsinki	3000 m st.
Mediterranean Games
Gold medal – first place	1971 Izmir	3000 m st.

Jean-Paul Villain (born 1 November 1946) is a retired French runner. In 1971 he won the steeplechase at the European Championships and Mediterranean Games. He competed in this event at the 1968, 1972 and in 1976 Summer Olympics with the best result of ninth place in 1968.
