= Mikhail Zhelev =

Bulgarian athlete (1943–2021)

Personal information
- Born: 15 July 1943 Sliven, Bulgaria
- Died: 5 January 2021 (aged 77) Sliven, Bulgaria

Sport
- Sport: Track and field
Medal record
Representing Bulgaria
European Championships
Gold medal – first place	1969 Athens	3000m steeplechase
Summer Universiade
Gold medal – first place	1970 Turin	3000m steeplechase

Mikhail Zhelev (Bulgarian: Михаил Желев; 15 July 1943 – 5 January 2021) was a Bulgarian athlete, known primarily for running the steeplechase. He competed in the 1968 Summer Olympics, finishing 6th and in the 1972 Summer Olympics, finishing 12th. He set his personal record of 8:25.0 while winning the race at the 1969 European Athletics Championships.
