= Arne Risa =

Norwegian long-distance runner

Arne Risa (born 5 May 1944) is a former Norwegian long-distance runner who specialized in 3000 metres steeplechase and 10,000 metres. He represented IL Gular.

At the 1968 Summer Olympics, he finished eighth in the 3000 m SC final in 9:09.98 minutes. He finished sixth at the 1969 European Championships. He was the Norwegian champion in 1968 and 1969.

His personal best time was 8:31.6 minutes achieved in August 1970 at Bislett stadion.

Over 10,000 m he had a personal best of 28:24.41 minutes, achieved in August 1971 in Helsinki. He was the Norwegian champion in this event in 1962-1972 and 1974.
