= List of Finnish Athletics Championships winners =

The Finnish Athletics Championships (Finnish: Kalevan kisat) is an annual track and field competition which serves as the national championship for Finland. It is organised by the Finnish Athletics Federation, Finland's national governing body for the sport of athletics. The winner of each event at the championships is declared the national champion for that year.

== Men ==
=== 100 metres ===
- 1960: Börje Strand
- 1961: Pentti Rekola
- 1962: Pauli Ny
- 1963: Pauli Ny
- 1964: Aarno Musku
- 1965: Aarno Musku
- 1966: Jorma Ehrström
- 1967: Erik Gustafsson
- 1968: Ossi Karttunen
- 1969: Ossi Karttunen
- 1970: Raimo Vilén
- 1971: Raimo Vilén
- 1972: Raimo Vilén
- 1973: Antti Rajamäki
- 1974: Antti Rajamäki
- 1975: Antti Rajamäki
- 1976: Raimo Räty
- 1977: Antti Rajamäki
- 1978: Antti Rajamäki
- 1979: Ossi Karttunen
- 1980: Esko Elsilä
- 1981: Tapani Turunen
- 1982: Jukka Sihvonen
- 1983: Kimmo Saaristo
- 1984: Kimmo Saaristo
- 1985: Kimmo Saaristo
- 1986: Kimmo Saaristo
- 1987: Ari Salonen
- 1988: Jarkko Toivonen
- 1989: Kari Niemi
- 1990: Turo Meriläinen
- 1991: Sami Länsivuori
- 1992: Sami Länsivuori
- 1993: Janne Haapasalo
- 1994: Ari Pakarinen
- 1995: Harri Kivelä
- 1996: Ari Pakarinen
- 1997: Harri Kivelä
- 1998: Janne Haapasalo
- 1999: Kim Lesch
- 2000: Tuomas Näsi
- 2001: Kari Louramo
- 2002: Markus Pöyhönen
- 2003: Markus Pöyhönen
- 2004: Stefan Koivikko
- 2005: Markus Pöyhönen
- 2006: Visa Hongisto

=== 200 metres ===
- 1960: Börje Strand
- 1961: Börje Strand
- 1962: Börje Strand
- 1963: Pauli Ny
- 1964: Aarno Musku
- 1965: Aarno Musku
- 1966: Ossi Karttunen
- 1967: Ossi Karttunen
- 1968: Ossi Karttunen
- 1969: Ossi Karttunen
- 1970: Ossi Karttunen
- 1971: Markku Kukkoaho
- 1972: Antti Rajamäki
- 1973: Ossi Karttunen
- 1974: Ossi Karttunen
- 1975: Antti Rajamäki
- 1976: Markku Kukkoaho
- 1977: Ossi Karttunen
- 1978: Antti Rajamäki
- 1979: Jukka Sulalampi
- 1980: Hannu Mykrä
- 1981: Kimmo Saaristo
- 1982: Kimmo Saaristo
- 1983: Kimmo Saaristo
- 1984: Kimmo Saaristo
- 1985: Kimmo Saaristo
- 1986: Kimmo Saaristo
- 1987: Juha Pyy
- 1988: Sakari Syväoja
- 1989: Kai Kyllönen
- 1990: Matti Heusala
- 1991: Jouni Myllymäki
- 1992: Kari Niemi
- 1993: Ari Pakarinen
- 1994: Kai Kyllönen
- 1995: Ari Pakarinen
- 1996: Ari Pakarinen
- 1997: Janne Hautaniemi
- 1998: Harri Kivelä
- 1999: Aleksi Sillanpää
- 2000: Tommi Hartonen
- 2001: Tommi Hartonen
- 2002: Tommi Hartonen
- 2003: Samsa Tuikka
- 2004: Tommi Hartonen
- 2005: Visa Hongisto
- 2006: Nghi Tran

=== 400 metres ===
- 1960: Jussi Rintamäki
- 1961: Jussi Rintamäki
- 1962: Jussi Rintamäki
- 1963: Matti Honkanen
- 1964: Erkki Kolkka
- 1965: Heikki Pippola
- 1966: Heikki Pippola
- 1967: Heikki Pippola
- 1968: Jaakko Tuominen
- 1969: Juhani Kotikoski
- 1970: Markku Kukkoaho
- 1971: Markku Kukkoaho
- 1972: Markku Kukkoaho
- 1973: Markku Taskinen
- 1974: Markku Kukkoaho
- 1975: Ossi Karttunen
- 1976: Ossi Karttunen
- 1977: Hannu Mäkelä
- 1978: Ossi Karttunen
- 1979: Heikki Hämäläinen
- 1980: Hannu Mykrä
- 1981: Hannu Mykrä
- 1982: Hannu Mykrä
- 1983: Matti Rusanen
- 1984: Hannu Mykrä
- 1985: Petri Hänninen
- 1986: Jari Niemelä
- 1987: Jari Niemelä
- 1988: Mika Hänninen
- 1989: Jari Niemelä
- 1990: Ari Pinomäki
- 1991: Ari Pinomäki
- 1992: Mikael Söderman
- 1993: Janne Pajunen
- 1994: Ari Pinomäki
- 1995: Kari Louramo
- 1996: Tommi Hartonen
- 1997: Petri Pohjonen
- 1998: Petri Pohjonen
- 1999: Petri Pohjonen
- 2000: Wilson Kirwa
- 2001: Mikko Karppi
- 2002: Wilson Kirwa
- 2003: Abdelghani Nouidra
- 2004: Antti Toivonen
- 2005: Ari Kauppinen
- 2006: Antti Toivonen

=== 800 metres ===
- 1960: Olavi Salonen
- 1961: Olavi Salonen
- 1962: Olavi Salonen
- 1963: Olavi Salonen
- 1964: Pekka Juutilainen
- 1965: Juha Väätäinen
- 1966: Heikki Pippola
- 1967: Juha Väätäinen
- 1968: Olof Nyman
- 1969: Markku Aalto
- 1970: Pekka Vasala
- 1971: Pekka Vasala
- 1972: Pekka Vasala
- 1973: Markku Taskinen
- 1974: Markku Taskinen
- 1975: Markku Taskinen
- 1976: Markku Taskinen
- 1977: Ari Paunonen
- 1978: Markku Taskinen
- 1979: Antti Loikkanen
- 1980: Jorma Härkönen
- 1981: Jorma Härkönen
- 1982: Jorma Härkönen
- 1983: Jorma Härkönen
- 1984: Jorma Härkönen
- 1985: Ari Suhonen
- 1986: Ari Suhonen
- 1987: Ari Suhonen
- 1988: Ari Suhonen
- 1989: Ari Suhonen
- 1990: Ari Suhonen
- 1991: Ari Suhonen
- 1992: Ari Suhonen
- 1993: Ari Suhonen
- 1994: Mikael Söderman
- 1995: Mikael Söderman
- 1996: Esko Parpala
- 1997: Juha Kukkamo
- 1998: Wilson Kirwa
- 1999: Wilson Kirwa
- 2000: Wilson Kirwa
- 2001: Juha Kukkamo
- 2002: Wilson Kirwa
- 2003: Juha Kukkamo
- 2004: Wilson Kirwa
- 2005: Juha Kukkamo
- 2006: Mikko Lahtio

=== 1500 metres ===
- 1960: Olavi Salonen
- 1961: Olavi Salonen
- 1962: Olavi Salonen
- 1963: Olavi Salonen
- 1964: Olavi Vuorisalo
- 1965: Olavi Salonen
- 1966: Jouko Uola
- 1967: Olof Nyman
- 1968: Matti Tuura
- 1969: Pekka Vasala
- 1970: Pekka Vasala
- 1971: Pekka Vasala
- 1972: Lasse Virén
- 1973: Jouko Niskanen
- 1974: Lasse Virén
- 1975: Pekka Päivärinta
- 1976: Markku Laine
- 1977: Ari Paunonen
- 1978: Juhani Sams
- 1979: Ari Paunonen
- 1980: Antti Loikkanen
- 1981: Markku Laine
- 1982: Ilkka Äyräväinen
- 1983: Timo Lehto
- 1984: Timo Lehto
- 1985: Eero Kytölä
- 1986: Ari Suhonen
- 1987: Ari Suhonen
- 1988: Ari Suhonen
- 1989: Ari Suhonen
- 1990: Jukka Savonheimo
- 1991: Jari Venäläinen
- 1992: Jukka Savonheimo
- 1993: Ari Suhonen
- 1994: Sami Alanen
- 1995: Jouni Varis
- 1996: Sami Ylihärsilä
- 1997: Sami Valtonen
- 1998: Samuli Vasala
- 1999: Anders Rockas
- 2000: Wilson Kirwa
- 2001: Juha Kukkamo
- 2002: Kim Bergdahl
- 2003: Jukka Keskisalo
- 2004: Jonas Hamm
- 2005: Jonas Hamm
- 2006: Jukka Keskisalo

=== 5000 metres ===
- 1960: Reijo Höykinpuro
- 1961: Simo Saloranta
- 1962: Reijo Höykinpuro
- 1963: Simo Saloranta
- 1964: Simo Saloranta
- 1965: Pertti Sariomaa
- 1966: Mikko Ala-Leppilampi
- 1967: Jouko Kuha
- 1968: Seppo Matela
- 1969: Lasse Virén
- 1970: Mikko Ala-Leppilampi
- 1971: Rune Holmén
- 1972: Juha Väätäinen
- 1973: Risto Ala-Korpi
- 1974: Seppo Tuominen
- 1975: Pekka Päivärinta
- 1976: Lasse Virén
- 1977: Pekka Päivärinta
- 1978: Martti Vainio
- 1979: Hannu Okkola
- 1980: Martti Vainio
- 1981: Martti Vainio
- 1982: Martti Vainio
- 1983: Tommy Ekblom
- 1984: Hannu Okkola
- 1985: Jari Hemmilä
- 1986: Tommy Ekblom
- 1987: Martti Vainio
- 1988: Matti Valkonen
- 1989: Risto Ulmala
- 1990: Harri Hänninen
- 1991: Harri Hänninen
- 1992: Jukka Tammisuo
- 1993: Santtu Mäkinen
- 1994: Pasi Mattila
- 1995: Santtu Mäkinen
- 1996: Pasi Mattila
- 1997: Samuli Vasala
- 1998: Marko Kotila
- 1999: Samuli Vasala
- 2000: Marko Kotila
- 2001: Samuli Vasala
- 2002: Samuli Vasala
- 2003: Jari Matinlauri
- 2004: Jari Matinlauri
- 2005: Francis Kirwa
- 2006: Jussi Utriainen

=== 10,000 metres ===
- 1960: Simo Saloranta
- 1961: Paavo Pystynen
- 1962: Reijo Höykinpuro
- 1963: Pentti Luoto
- 1964: Eino Oksanen
- 1965: Raimo Tikka
- 1966: Mikko Ala-Leppilampi
- 1967: Rauno Mattila
- 1968: Mikko Ala-Leppilampi
- 1969: Ossi Bäckmand
- 1970: Rauno Mattila
- 1971: Juha Väätäinen
- 1972: Seppo Matela
- 1973: Pekka Päivärinta
- 1974: Pekka Päivärinta
- 1975: Seppo Tuominen
- 1976: Pekka Päivärinta
- 1977: Martti Vainio
- 1978: Martti Vainio
- 1979: Kaarlo Maaninka
- 1980: Martti Vainio
- 1981: Martti Vainio
- 1982: Martti Vainio
- 1983: Martti Vainio
- 1984: Seppo Liuttu
- 1985: Ismo Toukonen
- 1986: Martti Vainio
- 1987: Martti Vainio
- 1988: Martti Vainio
- 1989: Risto Ulmala
- 1990: Matti Valkonen
- 1991: Risto Ulmala
- 1992: Harri Hänninen
- 1993: Santtu Mäkinen
- 1994: Pasi Mattila
- 1995: Santtu Mäkinen
- 1996: Pasi Mattila
- 1997: Santtu Mäkinen
- 1998: Harri Hänninen
- 1999: Janne Holmén
- 2000: Janne Holmén
- 2001: Janne Holmén
- 2002: Jari Matinlauri
- 2003: Janne Holmén
- 2004: Jari Matinlauri
- 2005: Tuomo Lehtinen
- 2006: Jussi Utriainen

=== 20K run ===
- 1990: Ville Hautala
- 1991: Visa Orttenvuori
- 1992: Tuomo Keski-Ojala
- 1993: Tuomo Keski-Ojala
- 1994: Visa Orttenvuori
- 1995: Juuso Rainio

=== Half marathon ===
- 1996: Visa Orttenvuori
- 1997: Juuso Rainio
- 1998: Ville Hautala
- 1999: Ville Hautala
- 2000: Jussi Utriainen
- 2001: Pasi Mattila
- 2002: Yrjö Pesonen
- 2003: Francis Kirwa
- 2004: Jussi Utriainen
- 2005: Jussi Utriainen
- 2006: Jussi Utriainen

=== Marathon ===
- 1960: Eino Oksanen
- 1961: Paavo Kotila
- 1962: Tenho Salakka
- 1963: Paavo Pystynen
- 1964: Eino Valle
- 1965: Tenho Salakka
- 1966: Kalevi Ihaksi
- 1967: Kalevi Ihaksi
- 1968: Pentti Rummakko
- 1969: Pentti Rummakko
- 1970: Kalle Hakkarainen
- 1971: Pentti Rummakko
- 1972: Reino Paukkonen
- 1973: Reino Paukkonen
- 1974: Paavo Leiviskä
- 1975: Paavo Leiviskä
- 1976: Håkan Spik
- 1977: Håkan Spik
- 1978: Håkan Spik
- 1979: Jukka Toivola
- 1980: Esa Tikkanen
- 1981: Pertti Tiainen
- 1982: Niilo Kempe
- 1983: Håkan Spik
- 1984: Esa Liedes
- 1985: Vesa Kähköla
- 1986: Jouni Kortelainen
- 1987: Asko Uusimäki
- 1988: Vesa Kähköla
- 1989: Pekka Vähä-Vahe
- 1990: Ilkka Väänänen
- 1991: Pekka Vähä-Vahe
- 1992: Yrjö Pesonen
- 1993: Yrjö Pesonen
- 1994: Yrjö Pesonen
- 1995: Jussi Huttunen
- 1996: Jari Jaakkola
- 1997: Ville Hautala
- 1998: Lauri Friari
- 1999: Lauri Friari
- 2000: Yrjö Pesonen
- 2001: Jaakko Kero
- 2002: Yrjö Pesonen
- 2003: Yrjö Pesonen
- 2004: Petri Saavalainen
- 2005: Petri Saavalainen

=== 3000 metres steeplechase ===
- 1960: Pentti Karvonen
- 1961: Esko Sirén
- 1962: Ilmari Kurkivuori
- 1963: Esko Sirén
- 1964: Jouko Kuha
- 1965: Esko Sirén
- 1966: Jouko Kuha
- 1967: Jouko Kuha
- 1968: Hannu Partanen
- 1969: Hannu Partanen
- 1970: Mikko Ala-Leppilampi
- 1971: Pekka Päivärinta
- 1972: Tapio Kantanen
- 1973: Tapio Kantanen
- 1974: Tapio Kantanen
- 1975: Tapio Kantanen
- 1976: Tapio Kantanen
- 1977: Tapio Kantanen
- 1978: Ismo Toukonen
- 1979: Tommy Ekblom
- 1980: Tapio Kantanen
- 1981: Tommy Ekblom
- 1982: Tommy Ekblom
- 1983: Ismo Toukonen
- 1984: Tommy Ekblom
- 1985: Lars Sörensen
- 1986: Tommy Ekblom
- 1987: Kari Hänninen
- 1988: Jörgen Salo
- 1989: Jörgen Salo
- 1990: Jörgen Salo
- 1991: Jörgen Salo
- 1992: Ville Hautala
- 1993: Ville Hautala
- 1994: Ville Hautala
- 1995: Ville Hautala
- 1996: Ville-Veikko Sainio
- 1997: Ville-Veikko Sainio
- 1998: Ville-Veikko Sainio
- 1999: Jan-Erik Salo
- 2000: Kim Bergdahl
- 2001: Kim Bergdahl
- 2002: Kim Bergdahl
- 2003: Jukka Keskisalo
- 2004: Kim Bergdahl
- 2005: Jukka Keskisalo
- 2006: Jukka Keskisalo

=== 110 metres hurdles ===
- 1960: Raimo Koivu
- 1961: Raimo Koivu
- 1962: Aarre Asiala
- 1963: Juhani Vuori
- 1964: Matti Harri
- 1965: Antti Lanamäki
- 1966: Pekka Hyttinen
- 1967: Antti Lanamäki
- 1968: Ari Salin
- 1969: Ari Salin
- 1970: Esko Olkkonen
- 1971: Ari Salin
- 1972: Pauli Pursiainen
- 1973: Pauli Pursiainen
- 1974: Raimo Alanen
- 1975: Raimo Alanen
- 1976: Raimo Alanen
- 1977: Arto Bryggare
- 1978: Arto Bryggare
- 1979: Arto Bryggare
- 1980: Arto Bryggare
- 1981: Arto Bryggare
- 1982: Arto Bryggare
- 1983: Arto Bryggare
- 1984: Arto Bryggare
- 1985: Arto Bryggare
- 1986: Arto Bryggare
- 1987: Arto Bryggare
- 1988: Mikael Ylöstalo
- 1989: Mikael Ylöstalo
- 1990: Antti Haapakoski
- 1991: Kai Kyllönen
- 1992: Arto Bryggare
- 1993: Antti Haapakoski
- 1994: Antti Haapakoski
- 1995: Antti Haapakoski
- 1996: Antti Haapakoski
- 1997: Antti Haapakoski
- 1998: Eduard Hämäläinen
- 1999: Matti Niemi
- 2000: Jarno Jokihaara
- 2001: Jarno Jokihaara
- 2002: Marko Ritola
- 2003: Matti Niemi
- 2004: Marko Ritola
- 2005: Juha Sonck
- 2006: Marko Ritola

=== 400 metres hurdles ===
- 1960: Jussi Rintamäki
- 1961: Jussi Rintamäki
- 1962: Jussi Rintamäki
- 1963: Jussi Rintamäki
- 1964: Jaakko Tuominen
- 1965: Pertti Pyrrö
- 1966: Jaakko Tuominen
- 1967: Pauli Haapasalo
- 1968: Jaakko Tuominen
- 1969: Jaakko Tuominen
- 1970: Ari Salin
- 1971: Ari Salin
- 1972: Ari Salin
- 1973: Reijo Koivu
- 1974: Ari Salin
- 1975: Raimo Alanen
- 1976: Raimo Alanen
- 1977: Raimo Alanen
- 1978: Raimo Alanen
- 1979: Raimo Alanen
- 1980: Raimo Alanen
- 1981: Peter Brandt
- 1982: Jarmo Seppä
- 1983: Ove Blomfelt
- 1984: Tapio Kallio
- 1985: Alberto von Hellens
- 1986: Jari Rautapalo
- 1987: Vesa-Pekka Pihlavisto
- 1988: Markku Karvonen
- 1989: Sören Kronqvist
- 1990: Vesa-Pekka Pihlavisto
- 1991: Vesa-Pekka Pihlavisto
- 1992: Ismo Hämeenniemi
- 1993: Vesa-Pekka Pihlavisto
- 1994: Vesa-Pekka Pihlavisto
- 1995: Petteri Pulkkinen
- 1996: Vesa-Pekka Pihlavisto
- 1997: Jaakko Aaltonen
- 1998: Petteri Pulkkinen
- 1999: Janne Mäkelä
- 2000: Janne Mäkelä
- 2001: Kimmo Haapasalo
- 2002: Janne Mäkelä
- 2003: Ari-Pekka Lattu
- 2004: Ari-Pekka Lattu
- 2005: Ari-Pekka Lattu
- 2006: Ari-Pekka Lattu

=== High jump ===
- 1960: Eero Salminen
- 1961: Henrik Hellén
- 1962: Henrik Hellén
- 1963: Henrik Hellén
- 1964: Henrik Hellén
- 1965: Pertti Lantti
- 1966: Reijo Vähälä
- 1967: Antero Tapola
- 1968: Antero Tapola
- 1969: Antero Tapola
- 1970: Reijo Vähälä
- 1971: Asko Pesonen
- 1972: Lasse Viskari
- 1973: Asko Pesonen
- 1974: Asko Pesonen
- 1975: Harri Sundell
- 1976: Asko Pesonen
- 1977: Asko Pesonen
- 1978: Juha Porkka
- 1979: Matti Nieminen
- 1980: Ossi Aura
- 1981: Juha Porkka
- 1982: Mikko Levola
- 1983: Jouko Kilpi
- 1984: Erkki Niemi
- 1985: Mikko Levola
- 1986: Timo Ruuskanen
- 1987: Mikko Levola
- 1988: Veli-Pekka Kokkonen
- 1989: Mikko Levola
- 1990: Matti Viitala
- 1991: Juha Isolehto
- 1992: Juha Isolehto
- 1993: Juha Isolehto
- 1994: Juha Isolehto
- 1995: Juha Isolehto
- 1996: Oskari Frösén
- 1997: Juha Isolehto
- 1998: Mika Polku
- 1999: Oskari Frösén
- 2000: Mika Polku
- 2001: Mika Polku
- 2002: Oskari Frösén
- 2003: Mika Polku
- 2004: Oskari Frösén
- 2005: Oskari Frösén
- 2006: Heikki Taneli

=== Pole vault ===
- 1960: Eeles Landström
- 1961: Risto Ankio
- 1962: Pentti Nikula
- 1963: Kauko Nyström
- 1964: Pentti Nikula
- 1965: Aulis Kairento
- 1966: Risto Ivanoff
- 1967: Risto Ivanoff
- 1968: Erkki Mustakari
- 1969: Erkki Mustakari
- 1970: Auvo Pehkoranta
- 1971: Antti Kalliomäki
- 1972: Antti Kalliomäki
- 1973: Antti Kalliomäki
- 1974: Antti Kalliomäki
- 1975: Antti Kalliomäki
- 1976: Tapani Haapakoski
- 1977: Antti Kalliomäki
- 1978: Antti Kalliomäki
- 1979: Kimmo Pallonen
- 1980: Rauli Pudas
- 1981: Kimmo Pallonen
- 1982: Antti Kalliomäki
- 1983: Veijo Vannesluoma
- 1984: Kimmo Pallonen
- 1985: Kimmo Pallonen
- 1986: Kimmo Kuusela
- 1987: Kimmo Kuusela
- 1988: Asko Peltoniemi
- 1989: Jani Lehtonen
- 1990: Petri Peltoniemi
- 1991: Petri Peltoniemi
- 1992: Asko Peltoniemi
- 1993: Jani Lehtonen
- 1994: Jani Lehtonen
- 1995: Heikki Vääräniemi
- 1996: Heikki Vääräniemi
- 1997: Vesa Rantanen
- 1998: Heikki Vääräniemi
- 1999: Jussi Autio
- 2000: Vesa Rantanen
- 2001: Vesa Rantanen
- 2002: Mikko Latvala
- 2003: Matti Mononen
- 2004: Vesa Rantanen
- 2005: Mikko Latvala
- 2006: Matti Mononen

=== Long jump ===
- 1960: Juhani Manninen
- 1961: Jorma Valkama
- 1962: Rainer Stenius
- 1963: Pentti Eskola
- 1964: Aarre Asiala
- 1965: Rainer Stenius
- 1966: Rainer Stenius
- 1967: Pertti Pousi
- 1968: Pertti Pousi
- 1969: Pertti Pousi
- 1970: Kari Palmén
- 1971: Mauri Myllymäki
- 1972: Ari Väänänen
- 1973: Ari Väänänen
- 1974: Pekka Suvitie
- 1975: Ari Väänänen
- 1976: Esko Elsilä
- 1977: Erkki Päivärinta
- 1978: Esko Elsilä
- 1979: Pekka Suvitie
- 1980: Olli Pousi
- 1981: Hannu Puhakka
- 1982: Jarmo Kärnä
- 1983: Jarmo Kärnä
- 1984: Jarmo Kärnä
- 1985: Jarmo Kärnä
- 1986: Petri Keskitalo
- 1987: Jarmo Kärnä
- 1988: Jarmo Kärnä
- 1989: Juha Kivi
- 1990: Jarmo Kärnä
- 1991: Jarmo Kärnä
- 1992: Mika Kahma
- 1993: Juha Kivi
- 1994: Otto Kärki
- 1995: Jami Hirvonen
- 1996: Kenneth Kastrén
- 1997: Otto Kärki
- 1998: Niklas Rorarius
- 1999: Kenneth Kastrén
- 2000: Kenneth Kastrén
- 2001: Tommi Evilä
- 2002: Niklas Rorarius
- 2003: Tommi Evilä
- 2004: Tommi Evilä
- 2005: Tommi Evilä
- 2006: Tommi Evilä

=== Triple jump ===
- 1960: Kari Rahkamo
- 1961: Yrjö Tamminen
- 1962: Yrjö Tamminen
- 1963: Yrjö Tamminen
- 1964: Yrjö Tamminen
- 1965: Kaj Helminen
- 1966: Pertti Pousi
- 1967: Pertti Pousi
- 1968: Pertti Pousi
- 1969: Pertti Pousi
- 1970: Ismo Salmi
- 1971: Pentti Kuukasjärvi
- 1972: Pentti Kuukasjärvi
- 1973: Juhani Mäki-Maunas
- 1974: Pentti Kuukasjärvi
- 1975: Pentti Kuukasjärvi
- 1976: Pentti Kuukasjärvi
- 1977: Pentti Kuukasjärvi
- 1978: Pentti Kuukasjärvi
- 1979: Olli Pousi
- 1980: Olli Pousi
- 1981: Olli Pousi
- 1982: Markku Rokala
- 1983: Esa Viitasalo
- 1984: Esa Viitasalo
- 1985: Esa Viitasalo
- 1986: Harri Pesonen
- 1987: Heikki Herva
- 1988: Esa Viitasalo
- 1989: Tuomas Sallinen
- 1990: Heikki Herva
- 1991: Markku Rokala
- 1992: Markku Rokala
- 1993: Heikki Herva
- 1994: Heikki Herva
- 1995: Jari Lämsä
- 1996: Marko Leino
- 1997: Johan Meriluoto
- 1998: Johan Meriluoto
- 1999: Johan Meriluoto
- 2000: Johan Meriluoto
- 2001: Johan Meriluoto
- 2002: Johan Meriluoto
- 2003: Johan Meriluoto
- 2004: Janne Harju
- 2005: Johan Meriluoto
- 2006: Johan Meriluoto

=== Shot put ===
- 1960: Jarmo Kunnas
- 1961: Alpo Nisula
- 1962: Jarmo Kunnas
- 1963: Seppo Simola
- 1964: Seppo Simola
- 1965: Matti Yrjölä
- 1966: Matti Yrjölä
- 1967: Matti Yrjölä
- 1968: Matti Yrjölä
- 1969: Matti Yrjölä
- 1970: Seppo Simola
- 1971: Seppo Simola
- 1972: Seppo Simola
- 1973: Reijo Ståhlberg
- 1974: Reijo Ståhlberg
- 1975: Matti Yrjölä
- 1976: Reijo Ståhlberg
- 1977: Reijo Ståhlberg
- 1978: Reijo Ståhlberg
- 1979: Reijo Ståhlberg
- 1980: Reijo Ståhlberg
- 1981: Reijo Ståhlberg
- 1982: Reijo Ståhlberg
- 1983: Aulis Akonniemi
- 1984: Aulis Akonniemi
- 1985: Aulis Toivonen
- 1986: Jari Kuoppa
- 1987: Janne Ronkainen
- 1988: Jari Kuoppa
- 1989: Janne Ronkainen
- 1990: Janne Ronkainen
- 1991: Petri Torniainen
- 1992: Antero Paljakka
- 1993: Markus Koistinen
- 1994: Mika Halvari
- 1995: Mika Halvari
- 1996: Arsi Harju
- 1997: Mika Halvari
- 1998: Arsi Harju
- 1999: Ville Tiisanoja
- 2000: Arsi Harju
- 2001: Conny Karlsson
- 2002: Conny Karlsson
- 2003: Tepa Reinikainen
- 2004: Tepa Reinikainen
- 2005: Ville Tiisanoja
- 2006: Ville Tiisanoja

=== Discus throw ===
- 1960: Pentti Repo
- 1961: Carol Lindroos
- 1962: Pentti Repo
- 1963: Pentti Repo
- 1964: Pentti Repo
- 1965: Pentti Repo
- 1966: Pentti Repo
- 1967: Niilo Hangasvaara
- 1968: Niilo Hangasvaara
- 1969: Jouko Montonen
- 1970: Pentti Kahma
- 1971: Pentti Kahma
- 1972: Jorma Rinne
- 1973: Pentti Kahma
- 1974: Pentti Kahma
- 1975: Pentti Kahma
- 1976: Pentti Kahma
- 1977: Markku Tuokko
- 1978: Pentti Kahma
- 1979: Markku Tuokko
- 1980: Markku Tuokko
- 1981: Markku Tuokko
- 1982: Markku Tuokko
- 1983: Ari Huumonen
- 1984: Juhani Tuomola
- 1985: Ari Huumonen
- 1986: Raimo Vento
- 1987: Ari Huumonen
- 1988: Mika Muukka
- 1989: Raimo Vento
- 1990: Mika Muukka
- 1991: Heikki Hollmén
- 1992: Heikki Hollmén
- 1993: Martti Halmesmäki
- 1994: Harri Uurainen
- 1995: Harri Uurainen
- 1996: Timo Sinervo
- 1997: Harri Uurainen
- 1998: Timo Tompuri
- 1999: Pertti Hynni
- 2000: Timo Tompuri
- 2001: Timo Tompuri
- 2002: Mika Loikkanen
- 2003: Timo Tompuri
- 2004: Pertti Hynni
- 2005: Timo Tompuri
- 2006: Mikko Kyyrö

=== Hammer throw ===
- 1960: Kalevi Horppu
- 1961: Kalevi Horppu
- 1962: Kalevi Horppu
- 1963: Kalevi Horppu
- 1964: Reino Sauripää
- 1965: Kauko Harlos
- 1966: Kauko Harlos
- 1967: Kauko Harlos
- 1968: Kauko Harlos
- 1969: Kauko Harlos
- 1970: Risto Miettinen
- 1971: Risto Miettinen
- 1972: Raimo Savinainen
- 1973: Heikki Kangas
- 1974: Matti Järvensivu
- 1975: Harri Huhtala
- 1976: Harri Huhtala
- 1977: Juha Tiainen
- 1978: Hannu Polvi
- 1979: Juha Tiainen
- 1980: Harri Huhtala
- 1981: Juha Tiainen
- 1982: Harri Huhtala
- 1983: Harri Huhtala
- 1984: Juha Tiainen
- 1985: Harri Huhtala
- 1986: Harri Huhtala
- 1987: Juha Tiainen
- 1988: Harri Huhtala
- 1989: Harri Huhtala
- 1990: Juha Tiainen
- 1991: Lasse Akselin
- 1992: Lasse Akselin
- 1993: Marko Wahlman
- 1994: Mika Laaksonen
- 1995: Marko Wahlman
- 1996: Marko Wahlman
- 1997: Marko Wahlman
- 1998: Olli-Pekka Karjalainen
- 1999: Olli-Pekka Karjalainen
- 2000: Olli-Pekka Karjalainen
- 2001: Olli-Pekka Karjalainen
- 2002: Olli-Pekka Karjalainen
- 2003: Olli-Pekka Karjalainen
- 2004: Olli-Pekka Karjalainen
- 2005: Olli-Pekka Karjalainen
- 2006: Olli-Pekka Karjalainen

=== Javelin throw ===
- 1960: Väinö Kuisma
- 1961: Pauli Nevala
- 1962: Pauli Nevala
- 1963: Pauli Nevala
- 1964: Jorma Kinnunen
- 1965: Jorma Kinnunen
- 1966: Jorma Kinnunen
- 1967: Pauli Nevala
- 1968: Jorma Kinnunen
- 1969: Jorma Kinnunen
- 1970: Hannu Siitonen
- 1971: Hannu Siitonen
- 1972: Hannu Siitonen
- 1973: Hannu Siitonen
- 1974: Hannu Siitonen
- 1975: Aimo Aho
- 1976: Seppo Hovinen
- 1977: Seppo Hovinen
- 1978: Antero Puranen
- 1979: Esa Utriainen
- 1980: Pentti Sinersaari
- 1981: Antero Toivonen
- 1982: Arto Härkönen
- 1983: Pentti Sinersaari
- 1984: Tero Saviniemi
- 1985: Seppo Räty
- 1986: Seppo Räty
- 1987: Tapio Korjus
- 1988: Tapio Korjus
- 1989: Seppo Räty
- 1990: Seppo Räty
- 1991: Seppo Räty
- 1992: Juha Laukkanen
- 1993: Seppo Räty
- 1994: Juha Laukkanen
- 1995: Seppo Räty
- 1996: Seppo Räty
- 1997: Sami Saksio
- 1998: Aki Parviainen
- 1999: Aki Parviainen
- 2000: Aki Parviainen
- 2001: Aki Parviainen
- 2002: Aki Parviainen
- 2003: Aki Parviainen
- 2004: Tero Pitkämäki
- 2005: Tero Pitkämäki
- 2006: Tero Pitkämäki

=== Decathlon ===
- 1960: Markus Kahma
- 1961: Ossi Ojala
- 1962: Stig Nymander
- 1963: Stig Nymander
- 1964: Markus Kahma
- 1965: Stig Nymander
- 1966: Stig Nymander
- 1967: Timo Tuominen
- 1968: Timo Tuominen
- 1969: Hannu Kyösola
- 1970: Jorma Vesala
- 1971: Markku Juhola
- 1972: Pekka Suvitie
- 1973: Heikki Kyösola
- 1974: Heikki Kyösola
- 1975: Pekka Suvitie
- 1976: Heikki Leppänen
- 1977: Johannes Lahti
- 1978: Johannes Lahti
- 1979: Jan-Erik Romar
- 1980: Johannes Lahti
- 1981: Kari-Pekka Lax
- 1982: Johannes Lahti
- 1983: Jarmo Mäkelä
- 1984: Harri Sundell
- 1985: Henrik Broman
- 1986: Henrik Broman
- 1987: Petri Keskitalo
- 1988: Kaj Ekman
- 1989: Mikko Valle
- 1990: Kaj Ekman
- 1991: Jari Näkki
- 1992: Mikko Valle
- 1993: Mikko Valle
- 1994: Jarkko Finni
- 1995: Mikko Valle
- 1996: Mikko Valle
- 1997: Mikko Valle
- 1998: Mikko Valle
- 1999: Glenn Lindqvist
- 2000: Eduard Hämäläinen
- 2001: Jukka Väkeväinen
- 2002: Jukka Väkeväinen
- 2003: Henri Kokkonen
- 2004: Jaakko Ojaniemi
- 2005: Aki Heikkinen
- 2006: Lassi Raunio

=== 10 kilometres walk ===
- 1971: Pauli Hokkanen

=== 20 kilometres walk ===
The 1985 and 2001 championships were held on a track.

- 1960: Pentti Kallionpää
- 1961: Pentti Kallionpää
- 1962: Pekka Viljanen
- 1963: Pentti Kallionpää
- 1964: Martti Hokkanen
- 1965: Martti Hokkanen
- 1966: Martti Hokkanen
- 1967: Martti Hokkanen
- 1968: Paavo Pohjolainen
- 1969: Paavo Pohjolainen
- 1970: Paavo Pohjolainen
- 1971: Seppo Immonen
- 1972: Paavo Pohjolainen
- 1973: Reima Salonen
- 1974: Reima Salonen
- 1975: Reima Salonen
- 1976: Reima Salonen
- 1977: Reima Salonen
- 1978: Reima Salonen
- 1979: Reima Salonen
- 1980: Reima Salonen
- 1981: Reima Salonen
- 1982: Reima Salonen
- 1983: Reima Salonen
- 1984: Matti Katila
- 1985: Reima Salonen
- 1986: Reima Salonen
- 1987: Reima Salonen
- 1988: Reima Salonen
- 1989: Kari Ahonen
- 1990: Kari Ahonen
- 1991: Valentin Kononen
- 1992: Valentin Kononen
- 1993: Kari Ahonen
- 1994: Valentin Kononen
- 1995: Valentin Kononen
- 1996: Risto Nurmi
- 1997: Valentin Kononen
- 1998: Antero Lindman
- 1999: Valentin Kononen
- 2000: Valentin Kononen
- 2001: Jani Lehtinen
- 2002: Jani Lehtinen
- 2003: Jani Lehtinen
- 2004: Jani Lehtinen
- 2005: Antti Kempas
- 2006: Antti Kempas

=== 30 kilometres walk ===
- 1965: Martti Hokkanen
- 1966: Martti Hokkanen
- 1967: Martti Hokkanen
- 1968: Daniel Björkgren

=== 50 kilometres walk ===
- 1960: Paavo Saira
- 1961: Mikko Saira
- 1962: Paavo Saira
- 1963: Paavo Saira
- 1964: Paavo Saira
- 1965: Not held
- 1966: Not held
- 1967: Not held
- 1968: Not held
- 1969: Paavo Saira
- 1970: Paavo Pohjolainen
- 1971: Paavo Saira
- 1972: Paavo Pohjolainen
- 1973: Stig Fröberg
- 1974: Reima Salonen
- 1975: Reima Salonen
- 1976: Seppo Immonen
- 1977: Reima Salonen
- 1978: Reima Salonen
- 1979: Reima Salonen
- 1980: Matti Katila
- 1981: Reima Salonen
- 1982: Reima Salonen
- 1983: Matti Katila
- 1984: Reima Salonen
- 1985: Reima Salonen
- 1986: Reima Salonen
- 1987: Reima Salonen
- 1988: Veijo Savikko
- 1989: Kari Ahonen
- 1990: Kari Ahonen
- 1991: Antero Lindman
- 1992: Antero Lindman
- 1993: Antero Lindman
- 1994: Valentin Kononen
- 1995: Antero Lindman
- 1996: Antero Lindman
- 1997: Jani Lehtinen
- 1998: Heikki Kinnunen
- 1999: Antero Lindman
- 2000: Asko Turkki
- 2001: Seppo-Juhani Savolainen
- 2002: Seppo-Juhani Savolainen
- 2003: Antti Kempas
- 2004: Antti Kempas
- 2005: Timo Viljanen
- 2006: Timo Viljanen

=== Cross country (long course) ===
- 1960: Paavo Pystynen
- 1961: Paavo Pystynen
- 1962: Sakari Peltoniemi
- 1963: Jorma Virtanen
- 1964: Taisto Teräväinen
- 1965: Jouko Kuha
- 1966: Mikko Ala-Leppilampi
- 1967: Erkki Koskinen
- 1968: Jouko Kuha
- 1969: Seppo Tuominen
- 1970: Seppo Tuominen
- 1971: Seppo Tuominen
- 1972: Tapio Kantanen
- 1973: Pekka Päivärinta
- 1974: Pekka Päivärinta
- 1975: Pekka Päivärinta
- 1976: Pekka Päivärinta
- 1977: Pekka Päivärinta
- 1978: Kaarlo Maaninka
- 1979: Kaarlo Maaninka
- 1980: Kaarlo Maaninka
- 1981: Martti Vainio
- 1982: Jouni Kortelainen
- 1983: Martti Vainio
- 1984: Henrik Sandström
- 1985: Jari Hemmilä
- 1986: Martti Vainio
- 1987: Martti Vainio
- 1988: Matti Valkonen
- 1989: Risto Ulmala
- 1990: Risto Ulmala
- 1991: Risto Ulmala
- 1992: Harri Hänninen
- 1993: Harri Hänninen
- 1994: Risto Ulmala
- 1995: Veli-Matti Ranta
- 1996: Visa Orttenvuori
- 1997: Harri Hänninen
- 1998: Ville Hautala
- 1999: Pasi Mattila
- 2000: Jussi Utriainen
- 2001: Jussi Utriainen
- 2002: Jari Matinlauri
- 2003: Jussi Utriainen
- 2004: Jussi Utriainen
- 2005: Tuomo Lehtinen
- 2006: Jussi Utriainen

=== Cross country (short course) ===
- 1960: Olavi Salonen
- 1961: Olavi Salonen
- 1962: Olavi Salonen
- 1963: Esko Sirén
- 1964: Pentti Rissanen
- 1965: Pentti Rissanen
- 1966: Pentti Rissanen
- 1967: Esko Sirén
- 1968: Olavi Suomalainen
- 1969: Reino Ahvenainen
- 1970: Mikko Ala-Leppilampi
- 1971: Mikko Ala-Leppilampi
- 1972: Mikko Ala-Leppilampi
- 1973: Tapio Kantanen
- 1974: Risto Ala-Korpi
- 1975: Tapio Kantanen
- 1976: Lasse Virén
- 1977: Ari Paunonen
- 1978: Lasse Virén
- 1979: Ari Paunonen
- 1980: Ari Paunonen
- 1981: Tommy Ekblom
- 1982: Tommy Ekblom
- 1983: Tommy Ekblom
- 1984: Tommy Ekblom
- 1985: Tommy Ekblom
- 1986: Matti Valkonen
- 1987: Harri Hänninen
- 1988: Risto Ulmala
- 1989: Harri Hänninen
- 1990: Harri Hänninen
- 1991: Jörgen Salo
- 1992: Jari Venäläinen
- 1993: Jari Venäläinen
- 1994: Sami Alanen
- 1995: Mika Maaskola
- 1996: Samuli Vasala
- 1997: Samuli Vasala
- 1998: Marko Kotila
- 1999: Marko Kotila
- 2000: Marko Kotila
- 2001: Samuli Vasala
- 2002: Samuli Vasala
- 2003: Jari Matinlauri
- 2004: Jussi Utriainen
- 2005: Simo Wannas
- 2006: Jukka Keskisalo

== Women ==
=== 100 metres ===
- 1960: Brita Johansson
- 1961: Brita Johansson
- 1962: Brita Johansson
- 1963: Maija Koivusaari
- 1964: Maija Koivusaari
- 1965: Maija Koivusaari
- 1966: Sirkka Norrlund
- 1967: Mona-Lisa Pursiainen
- 1968: Mona-Lisa Pursiainen
- 1969: Mona-Lisa Pursiainen
- 1970: Mona-Lisa Pursiainen
- 1971: Tuula Rautanen
- 1972: Tuula Rautanen
- 1973: Mona-Lisa Pursiainen
- 1974: Mona-Lisa Pursiainen
- 1975: Mona-Lisa Pursiainen
- 1976: Mona-Lisa Pursiainen
- 1977: Mona-Lisa Pursiainen
- 1978: Helinä Marjamaa
- 1979: Helinä Marjamaa
- 1980: Riitta Vesanen
- 1981: Helinä Marjamaa
- 1982: Helinä Marjamaa
- 1983: Helinä Marjamaa
- 1984: Helinä Marjamaa
- 1985: Sisko Hanhijoki
- 1986: Sisko Hanhijoki
- 1987: Auli Marttinen
- 1988: Sisko Hanhijoki
- 1989: Sisko Hanhijoki
- 1990: Sisko Hanhijoki
- 1991: Sisko Hanhijoki
- 1992: Sisko Hanhijoki
- 1993: Sanna Kyllönen
- 1994: Sanna Kyllönen
- 1995: Sanna Kyllönen
- 1996: Sanna Kyllönen
- 1997: Sanna Kyllönen
- 1998: Sanna Kyllönen
- 1999: Sanna Kyllönen
- 2000: Heidi Hannula
- 2001: Johanna Manninen
- 2002: Johanna Manninen
- 2003: Johanna Manninen
- 2004: Johanna Manninen
- 2005: Heidi Hannula
- 2006: Heidi Hannula

=== 200 metres ===
- 1960: Aulikki Jaakkola
- 1961: Sirkka Norrlund
- 1962: Hilkka Kivistö
- 1963: Hilkka Kivistö
- 1964: Sirkka Norrlund
- 1965: Eeva Haimi
- 1966: Sirkka Norrlund
- 1967: Mona-Lisa Pursiainen
- 1968: Mona-Lisa Pursiainen
- 1969: Mona-Lisa Pursiainen
- 1970: Mona-Lisa Pursiainen
- 1971: Marika Lindholm
- 1972: Pirjo Häggman
- 1973: Tuula Rautanen
- 1974: Riitta Salin
- 1975: Riitta Salin
- 1976: Pirjo Häggman
- 1977: Pirjo Häggman
- 1978: Pirjo Häggman
- 1979: Helinä Marjamaa
- 1980: Pirjo Häggman
- 1981: Helinä Marjamaa
- 1982: Margareetta Honkaharju
- 1983: Helinä Marjamaa
- 1984: Helinä Marjamaa
- 1985: Sisko Hanhijoki
- 1986: Sisko Hanhijoki
- 1987: Auli Marttinen
- 1988: Sisko Hanhijoki
- 1989: Sisko Hanhijoki
- 1990: Sisko Hanhijoki
- 1991: Sisko Hanhijoki
- 1992: Sisko Hanhijoki
- 1993: Sanna Kyllönen
- 1994: Sanna Kyllönen
- 1995: Sanna Kyllönen
- 1996: Sanna Kyllönen
- 1997: Sanna Kyllönen
- 1998: Sanna Kyllönen
- 1999: Sanna Kyllönen
- 2000: Johanna Manninen
- 2001: Johanna Manninen
- 2002: Johanna Manninen
- 2003: Johanna Manninen
- 2004: Kirsi Mykkänen
- 2005: Kirsi Mykkänen
- 2006: Sari Keskitalo

=== 400 metres ===
- 1960: Aulikki Jaakkola
- 1961: Aulikki Jaakkola
- 1962: Eeva Haimi
- 1963: Eeva Haimi
- 1964: Eeva Haimi
- 1965: Eeva Haimi
- 1966: Eeva Haimi
- 1967: Eeva Haimi
- 1968: Eeva Haimi
- 1969: Eeva Haimi
- 1970: Mona-Lisa Pursiainen
- 1971: Marika Lindholm
- 1972: Pirjo Häggman
- 1973: Pirjo Häggman
- 1974: Riitta Salin
- 1975: Riitta Salin
- 1976: Riitta Salin
- 1977: Barbro Lindström
- 1978: Pirjo Häggman
- 1979: Pirjo Häggman
- 1980: Pirjo Häggman
- 1981: Terhi Tarkiainen
- 1982: Terhi Tarkiainen
- 1983: Terhi Tarkiainen
- 1984: Riitta Vesanen
- 1985: Tuija Helander
- 1986: Sonja Finell
- 1987: Tuija Helander-Kuusisto
- 1988: Sonja Finell
- 1989: Sonja Finell
- 1990: Sonja Finell
- 1991: Sonja Finell
- 1992: Sonja Finell
- 1993: Satu Jääskeläinen
- 1994: Heidi Suomi
- 1995: Heidi Suomi
- 1996: Riikka Niemelä
- 1997: Petra Söderström
- 1998: Petra Söderström
- 1999: Petra Söderström
- 2000: Petra Söderström
- 2001: Suvi Myllymäki
- 2002: Suvi Myllymäki
- 2003: Kirsi Mykkänen
- 2004: Kirsi Mykkänen
- 2005: Kirsi Mykkänen
- 2006: Kirsi Mykkänen

=== 800 metres ===
- 1960: Eila Mikola
- 1961: Saara Vilén
- 1962: Anita Aittala
- 1963: Eeva-Liisa Kalliolahti
- 1964: Eila Pellinen
- 1965: Eila Mikola
- 1966: Eeva-Liisa Kalliolahti
- 1967: Eeva-Liisa Kalliolahti
- 1968: Eeva Haimi
- 1969: Eeva Haimi
- 1970: Aila Virkberg
- 1971: Sinikka Tyynelä
- 1972: Sinikka Tyynelä
- 1973: Sinikka Tyynelä
- 1974: Aila Virkberg
- 1975: Nina Holmén
- 1976: Nina Holmén
- 1977: Sinikka Tyynelä
- 1978: Sinikka Tyynelä
- 1979: Yvonne Hannus
- 1980: Yvonne Hannus
- 1981: Yvonne Hannus
- 1982: Yvonne Hannus
- 1983: Irene Lusikka
- 1984: Kaisa Ylimäki
- 1985: Kaisa Ylimäki
- 1986: Kaisa Ylimäki
- 1987: Tiina Pakkala
- 1988: Tiina Pakkala
- 1989: Hanna Vuorimaa
- 1990: Tuuli Merikoski
- 1991: Tuuli Merikoski
- 1992: Marjo Piipponen
- 1993: Marjo Piipponen
- 1994: Satu Jääskeläinen
- 1995: Tytti Reho
- 1996: Monika Rönnholm
- 1997: Monika Kinnunen
- 1998: Marjo Venäläinen
- 1999: Tytti Reho
- 2000: Tytti Reho
- 2001: Suvi Myllymäki
- 2002: Suvi Myllymäki
- 2003: Minna Järvenpää
- 2004: Mari Järvenpää
- 2005: Suvi Myllymäki
- 2006: Mari Järvenpää

=== 1500 metres ===
- 1968: Pirjo Vihonen
- 1969: Pirjo Vihonen
- 1970: Pirjo Vihonen
- 1971: Sinikka Tyynelä
- 1972: Sinikka Tyynelä
- 1973: Sinikka Tyynelä
- 1974: Nina Holmén
- 1975: Nina Holmén
- 1976: Nina Holmén
- 1977: Sinikka Tyynelä
- 1978: Sinikka Tyynelä
- 1979: Aila Virkberg
- 1980: Aila Virkberg
- 1981: Marjo-Riitta Lakka
- 1982: Marjo-Riitta Lakka
- 1983: Marjo-Riitta Lakka
- 1984: Irene Marttila
- 1985: Marjo-Riitta Lakka
- 1986: Marjo-Riitta Lakka
- 1987: Päivi Tikkanen
- 1988: Kaisa Siitonen
- 1989: Kaisa Siitonen
- 1990: Päivi Tikkanen
- 1991: Kaisa Siitonen
- 1992: Monika Rönnholm
- 1993: Monika Rönnholm
- 1994: Marjo Piipponen
- 1995: Marjo Venäläinen
- 1996: Monika Rönnholm
- 1997: Monika Kinnunen
- 1998: Marjo Venäläinen
- 1999: Marjo Venäläinen
- 2000: Tytti Reho
- 2001: Minna Nummela
- 2002: Johanna Lehtinen
- 2003: Johanna Lehtinen
- 2004: Johanna Lehtinen
- 2005: Johanna Lehtinen
- 2006: Johanna Lehtinen

=== 3000 metres ===
- 1972: Nina Holmén
- 1973: Pirjo Vihonen
- 1974: Sinikka Tyynelä
- 1975: Helena Pietilä
- 1976: Irja Paukkonen
- 1977: Sinikka Tyynelä
- 1978: Sinikka Tyynelä
- 1979: Aila Virkberg
- 1980: Tuija Toivonen
- 1981: Marjo-Riitta Lakka
- 1982: Helena Heikkinen
- 1983: Helena Heikkinen
- 1984: Tuija Toivonen
- 1985: Päivi Tikkanen
- 1986: Päivi Tikkanen
- 1987: Päivi Tikkanen
- 1988: Päivi Tikkanen
- 1989: Päivi Tikkanen
- 1990: Päivi Tikkanen
- 1991: Päivi Tikkanen
- 1992: Päivi Tikkanen
- 1993: Päivi Tikkanen
- 1994: Päivi Tikkanen

=== 5000 metres ===
- 1995: Annemari Sandell-Hyvärinen
- 1996: Päivi Tikkanen
- 1997: Tuula Laitinen
- 1998: Päivi Tikkanen
- 1999: Annemari Sandell-Hyvärinen
- 2000: Annemari Sandell-Hyvärinen
- 2001: Elina Lindgren
- 2002: Ulla Tuimala
- 2003: Kirsi Valasti
- 2004: Kirsi Valasti
- 2005: Annemari Sandell-Hyvärinen
- 2006: Ulla Tuimala

=== 10,000 metres ===
- 1983: Kristina Iisakkila
- 1984: Tuija Toivonen
- 1985: Tuija Toivonen
- 1986: Sinikka Keskitalo
- 1987: Tuija Jousimaa
- 1988: Tuija Jousimaa
- 1989: Päivi Tikkanen
- 1990: Päivi Tikkanen
- 1991: Päivi Tikkanen
- 1992: Päivi Tikkanen
- 1993: Ritva Lemettinen
- 1994: Annemari Sandell-Hyvärinen
- 1995: Päivi Tikkanen
- 1996: Päivi Tikkanen
- 1997: Päivi Tikkanen
- 1998: Päivi Tikkanen
- 1999: Kirsi Rauta
- 2000: Maria Söderström
- 2001: Kirsi Valasti
- 2002: Maria Söderström
- 2003: Kirsi Valasti
- 2004: Maija Kukkohovi
- 2005: Annemari Sandell-Hyvärinen
- 2006: Maija Oravamäki

=== 15K run ===
- 1990: Kirsi Rauta
- 1991: Kirsi Rauta
- 1992: Ritva Lemettinen
- 1993: Carita Sunell
- 1994: Ritva Lemettinen
- 1995: Erja Ervonen

=== Half marathon ===
- 1996: Kirsi Rauta
- 1997: Marjaana Lahti-Koski
- 1998: Päivi Tikkanen
- 1999: Päivi Kauppinen
- 2000: Maria Söderström
- 2001: Maria Söderström
- 2002: Mari Niskanen
- 2003: Minna Myllykoski
- 2004: Elina Lindgren
- 2005: Maija Oravamäki
- 2006: Johanna Lehtinen

=== Marathon ===
- 1980: Tuija Toivonen
- 1981: Elli Hallikainen
- 1982: Tuija Toivonen
- 1983: Sinikka Keskitalo
- 1984: Sinikka Keskitalo
- 1985: Sinikka Keskitalo
- 1986: Sirkku Kumpulainen
- 1987: Sirpa Kytölä
- 1988: Sirpa Kytölä
- 1989: Marita Ylillkka
- 1990: Sinikka Keskitalo
- 1991: Sinikka Keskitalo
- 1992: Sari Juhola
- 1993: Anne Jääskeläinen
- 1994: Anne Jääskeläinen
- 1995: Anne Jääskeläinen
- 1996: Erja Ervonen
- 1997: Marjaana Lahti-Koski
- 1998: Sari Juntunen
- 1999: Marjaana Lahti-Koski
- 2000: Erja Nurkkala
- 2001: Maija Kukkohovi
- 2002: Kaisa Lettojärvi
- 2003: Pauliina Rasmus
- 2004: Marjaana Lahti-Koski
- 2005: Mira Tuominen

=== 3000 metres steeplechase ===
- 2001: Johanna Lehtinen
- 2002: Ulla Tuimala
- 2003: Maria Söderström
- 2004: Heidi Strandvall
- 2005: Anni Tuimala
- 2006: Mira Tuominen

=== 80 metres hurdles ===
- 1960: Tellervo Toppila
- 1961: Sirkka Norrlund
- 1962: Sirkka Norrlund
- 1963: Sirkka Norrlund
- 1964: Sirkka Norrlund
- 1965: Sirkka Norrlund
- 1966: Sirkka Norrlund
- 1967: Sirkka Norrlund
- 1968: Sirkka Norrlund

=== 100 metres hurdles ===
- 1969: Sirkka Norrlund
- 1970: Sirkka Norrlund
- 1971: Sirkka Norrlund
- 1972: Sirkka Norrlund
- 1973: Ulla Lempiänen
- 1974: Ulla Lempiänen
- 1975: Ulla Lempiänen
- 1976: Ulla Lempiänen
- 1977: Ulla Lempiänen
- 1978: Lena Spoof
- 1979: Lena Spoof
- 1980: Lena Spoof
- 1981: Tiina Lindgren
- 1982: Lena Spoof
- 1983: Saila Purho
- 1984: Ritva Valkeinen
- 1985: Tiina Lindgren
- 1986: Saila Purho
- 1987: Tiina Lindgren
- 1988: Satu Pauri
- 1989: Satu Pauri
- 1990: Satu Pauri
- 1991: Satu Pauri
- 1992: Paula Välimaa
- 1993: Jutta Kemilä
- 1994: Jutta Kemilä
- 1995: Jutta Kemilä
- 1996: Heini Sistonen
- 1997: Johanna Halkoaho
- 1998: Johanna Halkoaho
- 1999: Tiia Hautala
- 2000: Manuela Bosco
- 2001: Susanna Rajamäki
- 2002: Johanna Halkoaho
- 2003: Johanna Halkoaho
- 2004: Johanna Halkoaho
- 2005: Hanna Korell
- 2006: Johanna Halkoaho

=== 200 metres hurdles ===
- 1968: Sirkka Norrlund
- 1969: Sirkka Norrlund
- 1970: Sirkka Norrlund
- 1971: Sirkka Norrlund
- 1972: Pirja Hakala
- 1973: Pirja Hakala
- 1974: Pirja Hakala

=== 400 metres hurdles ===
- 1975: Hannele Parkkonen
- 1976: Hannele Parkkonen
- 1977: Tuija Helander
- 1978: Tuuli Heinonen
- 1979: Hannele Parkkonen
- 1980: Tuija Helander
- 1981: Tuuli Heinonen
- 1982: Tuija Helander
- 1983: Tuija Helander
- 1984: Tuija Helander
- 1985: Tuija Helander
- 1986: Tuija Helander
- 1987: Tuija Helander-Kuusisto
- 1988: Laila Andersson
- 1989: Tuija Helander-Kuusisto
- 1990: Tuija Helander-Kuusisto
- 1991: Anna Suurnäkki
- 1992: Anna Suurnäkki
- 1993: Marjut Töyli
- 1994: Petra Stenman
- 1995: Petra Stenman
- 1996: Petra Stenman
- 1997: Petra Söderström
- 1998: Petra Söderström
- 1999: Annika Kumlin
- 2000: Anja Rantanen
- 2001: Ilona Ranta
- 2002: Milla Kelo
- 2003: Manuela Bosco
- 2004: Petra Söderström
- 2005: Ilona Ranta
- 2006: Ilona Ranta

=== High jump ===
- 1960: Riitta-Maija Soppi
- 1961: Leena Kaarna
- 1962: Leena Kaarna
- 1963: Leena Kaarna
- 1964: Leena Kaarna
- 1965: Gun Nordlund
- 1966: Gun Nordlund
- 1967: Ritva Bister
- 1968: Ritva Bister
- 1969: Ritva Bister
- 1970: Eila Kelo
- 1971: Gun Nordlund
- 1972: Pia Salonen
- 1973: Susanne Sundqvist
- 1974: Susanne Sundqvist
- 1975: Susanne Sundqvist
- 1976: Susanne Sundqvist
- 1977: Susanne Sundqvist
- 1978: Susanne Sundqvist
- 1979: Kaisa Alasaari
- 1980: Minna Vehmasto
- 1981: Minna Vehmasto
- 1982: Lena Teckenberg
- 1983: Minna Vehmasto
- 1984: Niina Ranta
- 1985: Niina Vihanto
- 1986: Minna Rantanen
- 1987: Ringa Ropo-Junnila
- 1988: Marita Pakarinen
- 1989: Sari Karjalainen
- 1990: Katja Kilpi
- 1991: Katja Kilpi
- 1992: Katja Kilpi
- 1993: Johanna Manninen
- 1994: Kaisa Lehtonen
- 1995: Kaisa Gustafsson
- 1996: Kaisa Gustafsson
- 1997: Kaisa Gustafsson
- 1998: Kaisa Gustafsson
- 1999: Marianne Mattas
- 2000: Hanna Grobler
- 2001: Hanna Grobler
- 2002: Hanna Grobler
- 2003: Hanna Grobler
- 2004: Alina Mattila
- 2005: Hanna Grobler
- 2006: Hanna Grobler

=== Pole vault ===
- 1994: Birgitta Ivanoff
- 1995: Teija Saari
- 1996: Tiina Vilenius
- 1997: Teija Saari
- 1998: Teija Saari
- 1999: Teija Saari
- 2000: Annu Mäkelä
- 2001: Teija Saari
- 2002: Teija Saari
- 2003: Hanna Palamaa
- 2004: Saara Laaksonen
- 2005: Aino-Maija Karvinen
- 2006: Minna Nikkanen

=== Long jump ===
- 1960: Brita Johansson
- 1961: Brita Johansson
- 1962: Maija Koivusaari
- 1963: Maija Koivusaari
- 1964: Maija Koivusaari
- 1965: Maija Koivusaari
- 1966: Sirpa Niiranen
- 1967: Maija Koivusaari
- 1968: Maija Koivusaari
- 1969: Pirkko Helenius
- 1970: Pirkko Helenius
- 1971: Hannele Harju
- 1972: Tuula Rautanen
- 1973: Tuula Rautanen
- 1974: Pirkko Helenius
- 1975: Tuula Rautanen
- 1976: Tuula Rautanen
- 1977: Pirkko Helenius
- 1978: Leena Pylkkänen
- 1979: Leena Pylkkänen
- 1980: Leena Pylkkänen
- 1981: Tarja Koskelo
- 1982: Anne Kyllönen
- 1983: Anne Kyllönen
- 1984: Anna-Maija Bryggare
- 1985: Ragne Backman
- 1986: Ringa Ropo-Junnila
- 1987: Ringa Ropo-Junnila
- 1988: Ringa Ropo-Junnila
- 1989: Ringa Ropo-Junnila
- 1990: Ringa Ropo-Junnila
- 1991: Ringa Ropo-Junnila
- 1992: Ringa Ropo-Junnila
- 1993: Nina Saarman
- 1994: Ringa Ropo-Junnila
- 1995: Heli Koivula Kruger
- 1996: Heli Koivula Kruger
- 1997: Johanna Halkoaho
- 1998: Heli Koivula Kruger
- 1999: Tiia Hautala
- 2000: Susanna Rajamäki
- 2001: Johanna Halkoaho
- 2002: Heli Koivula Kruger
- 2003: Johanna Halkoaho
- 2004: Heli Koivula Kruger
- 2005: Niina Saarman-Bartholdi
- 2006: Maija Kovalainen

=== Triple jump ===
- 1990: Ragne Kytölä
- 1991: Carina Kjellman
- 1992: Carina Kjellman
- 1993: Marika Salminen
- 1994: Marika Salminen
- 1995: Kaisa Gustafsson
- 1996: Heli Koivula Kruger
- 1997: Sari Kulmala
- 1998: Heli Koivula Kruger
- 1999: Natalia Kilpeläinen
- 2000: Heli Koivula Kruger
- 2001: Heli Koivula Kruger
- 2002: Heli Koivula Kruger
- 2003: Heli Koivula Kruger
- 2004: Heli Koivula Kruger
- 2005: Natalia Kilpeläinen
- 2006: Natalia Kilpeläinen

=== Shot put ===
- 1960: Inkeri Talvitie
- 1961: Inkeri Talvitie
- 1962: Inkeri Lehtonen
- 1963: Marjatta Mäkinen
- 1964: Marjatta Mäkinen
- 1965: Marjatta Mäkinen
- 1966: Marjatta Mäkinen
- 1967: Marjatta Kuuluvainen
- 1968: Marjatta Kuuluvainen
- 1969: Christine Huttunen
- 1970: Christine Barck
- 1971: Christine Barck
- 1972: Christine Barck
- 1973: Christine Barck
- 1974: Ritva Metso
- 1975: Ritva Metso
- 1976: Ritva Metso
- 1977: Ritva Metso
- 1978: Tuula Kivi
- 1979: Tuula Kivi
- 1980: Tuula Kivi
- 1981: Tuula Kivi
- 1982: Tuula Kivi
- 1983: Asta Ovaska
- 1984: Asta Ovaska
- 1985: Asta Ovaska
- 1986: Asta Ovaska
- 1987: Asta Ovaska
- 1988: Asta Ovaska
- 1989: Asta Ovaska
- 1990: Asta Ovaska
- 1991: Asta Ovaska
- 1992: Asta Ovaska
- 1993: Asta Ovaska
- 1994: Karoliina Lundahl
- 1995: Marika Tuliniemi
- 1996: Karoliina Lundahl
- 1997: Marika Tuliniemi
- 1998: Karoliina Lundahl
- 1999: Anna Rauhala
- 2000: Anna Rauhala
- 2001: Anna Rauhala
- 2002: Anna Rauhala
- 2003: Niina Kelo
- 2004: Niina Kelo
- 2005: Niina Kelo
- 2006: Suvi Helin

=== Discus throw ===
- 1960: Inkeri Talvitie
- 1961: Inkeri Talvitie
- 1962: Inkeri Lehtonen
- 1963: Marjatta Mäkinen
- 1964: Marjatta Mäkinen
- 1965: Marjatta Mäkinen
- 1966: Marjatta Mäkinen
- 1967: Marjatta Kuuluvainen
- 1968: Marjatta Kuuluvainen
- 1969: Marjatta Kuuluvainen
- 1970: Marjatta Kuuluvainen
- 1971: Marja-Leena Karttunen
- 1972: Christine Barck
- 1973: Christine Barck
- 1974: Ritva Metso
- 1975: Ritva Metso
- 1976: Sinikka Riihelä
- 1977: Sinikka Salminen
- 1978: Sinikka Salminen
- 1979: Sinikka Salminen
- 1980: Ulla Lundholm
- 1981: Ulla Lundholm
- 1982: Satu Sulkio
- 1983: Ulla Lundholm
- 1984: Ulla Lundholm
- 1985: Marja-Leena Larpi
- 1986: Anne Känsäkangas
- 1987: Anne Känsäkangas
- 1988: Anne Känsäkangas
- 1989: Merja Säntti
- 1990: Diana Back
- 1991: Kati Siltovuori
- 1992: Marja Aalto
- 1993: Kati Siltovuori
- 1994: Kirsi Lindfors
- 1995: Diana Back
- 1996: Tiina Kankaanpää
- 1997: Tiina Kankaanpää
- 1998: Tiina Kankaanpää
- 1999: Tiina Kankaanpää
- 2000: Tiina Kankaanpää
- 2001: Tiina Kankaanpää
- 2002: Tiina Kankaanpää
- 2003: Tiina Kankaanpää
- 2004: Anita Hietalahti
- 2005: Niina Kelo
- 2006: Anita Hietalahti

=== Hammer throw ===
- 1994: Anni Punttila
- 1995: Anni Punttila
- 1996: Mia Strömmer
- 1997: Sini Latvala
- 1998: Sini Latvala
- 1999: Mia Strömmer
- 2000: Mia Strömmer
- 2001: Mia Strömmer
- 2002: Sini Latvala
- 2003: Sini Latvala
- 2004: Sini Latvala
- 2005: Sini Latvala
- 2006: Sini Latvala

=== Javelin throw ===
- 1960: Sirpa Toivola
- 1961: Raija Talvensaari
- 1962: Sirpa Toivola
- 1963: Raija Talvensaari
- 1964: Kaisa Launela
- 1965: Raija Mustonen
- 1966: Raija Mustonen
- 1967: Raija Mustonen
- 1968: Kaisa Launela
- 1969: Arja Mustakallio
- 1970: Kirsti Launela
- 1971: Kirsti Launela
- 1972: Kirsti Launela
- 1973: Pirjo Kumpulainen
- 1974: Pirjo Kumpulainen
- 1975: Arja Mustakallio
- 1976: Arja Mustakallio
- 1977: Ritva Metso
- 1978: Sisko Kopiloff
- 1979: Helena Laine
- 1980: Tiina Lillak
- 1981: Tiina Lillak
- 1982: Tuula Laaksalo
- 1983: Tiina Lillak
- 1984: Tuula Laaksalo
- 1985: Tiina Lillak
- 1986: Tiina Lillak
- 1987: Tiina Lillak
- 1988: Tuula Laaksalo
- 1989: Päivi Alafrantti
- 1990: Tiina Lillak
- 1991: Heli Rantanen
- 1992: Heli Rantanen
- 1993: Päivi Alafrantti
- 1994: Mikaela Ingberg
- 1995: Heli Rantanen
- 1996: Heli Rantanen
- 1997: Heli Rantanen
- 1998: Heli Rantanen
- 1999: Mikaela Ingberg
- 2000: Mikaela Ingberg
- 2001: Paula Tarvainen
- 2002: Mikaela Ingberg
- 2003: Paula Tarvainen
- 2004: Mikaela Ingberg
- 2005: Mikaela Ingberg
- 2006: Paula Tarvainen

=== Pentathlon ===
- 1960: Tuovi Vahtera
- 1961: Seija Kuha
- 1962: Tuovi Vahtera
- 1963: Sirkka Norrlund
- 1964: Sirkka Norrlund
- 1965: Sirkka Norrlund
- 1966: Sirkka Norrlund
- 1967: Pirkko Heikkilä
- 1968: Pirkko Heikkilä
- 1969: Pirkko Helenius
- 1970: Pirkko Helenius
- 1971: Hannele Harju
- 1972: Riitta-Liisa Ketamo
- 1973: Eija Ristola
- 1974: Ritva Metso
- 1975: Ritva Metso
- 1976: Ritva Metso
- 1977: Ritva Metso
- 1978: Satu Jääskeläinen
- 1979: Anne Kyllönen
- 1980: Anne Kyllönen

=== Heptathlon ===
- 1981: Anne Kyllönen
- 1982: Anne Kyllönen
- 1983: Anne Kyllönen
- 1984: Mirja Järvenpää
- 1985: Ragne Backman
- 1986: Ragne Backman
- 1987: Satu Pauri
- 1988: Tina Rättyä
- 1989: Tina Rättyä
- 1990: Satu Pauri
- 1991: Tina Rättyä
- 1992: Helle Aro
- 1993: Helle Aro
- 1994: Tiia Hautala
- 1995: Tiia Hautala
- 1996: Tiia Hautala
- 1997: Tiia Hautala
- 1998: Piia Peltosaari
- 1999: Piia Peltosaari
- 2000: Susanna Rajamäki
- 2001: Annu Montell
- 2002: Tiia Hautala
- 2003: Tiia Hautala
- 2004: Tiia Hautala
- 2005: Sanna Saarman
- 2006: Sanna Saarman

=== 5000 metres walk ===
- 1971: Pirkko Pollari
- 1972: Riitta Immonen
- 1973: Anne Fröberg
- 1974: Taina Havisto
- 1975: Anne Fröberg
- 1976: Sirkka Haataja
- 1977: Sirkka Haataja
- 1978: Sirkka Haataja
- 1979: Sirkka Haataja
- 1980: Sirkka Haataja
- 1981: Sirkka Haataja
- 1982: Sirkka Haataja
- 1983: Helena Åström
- 1984: Sirkka Oikarinen
- 1985: Sirkka Oikarinen
- 1986: Mirva Hämäläinen
- 1987: Sari Essayah
- 1988: Sari Essayah
- 1989: Sari Essayah
- 1990: Sari Essayah
- 1991: Sari Essayah
- 1992: Sari Essayah
- 1993: Sari Essayah
- 1994: Sari Essayah

=== 10 kilometres walk ===
The championships were held on a track in 1985, 1987, 1988, 1990, 1996 and 2000.

- 1975: Anne Fröberg
- 1976: Not held
- 1977: Not held
- 1978: Not held
- 1979: Not held
- 1980: Not held
- 1981: Sirkka Haataja
- 1982: Sirkka Oikarinen
- 1983: Helena Åström
- 1984: Sirkka Oikarinen
- 1985: Sirkka Oikarinen
- 1986: Sirkka Oikarinen
- 1987: Mirva Hämäläinen
- 1988: Sari Essayah
- 1989: Sari Essayah
- 1990: Sari Essayah
- 1991: Sari Essayah
- 1992: Mira Saastamoinen
- 1993: Sari Essayah
- 1994: Sari Essayah
- 1995: Sari Essayah
- 1996: Sari Essayah
- 1997: Krista Ranta-Pere
- 1998: Outi Sillanpää
- 1999: Outi Sillanpää
- 2000: Tiina Muinonen
- 2001: Heidi Lindewall
- 2002: Outi Sillanpää
- 2003: Outi Sillanpää
- 2004: Outi Sillanpää
- 2005: Outi Sillanpää
- 2006: Marja Penttinen

=== 20 kilometres walk ===
- 1995: Sari Essayah
- 1996: Sari Essayah
- 1997: Tarja Jaskari
- 1998: Tarja Jaskari
- 1999: Outi Sillanpää
- 2000: Outi Sillanpää
- 2001: Outi Sillanpää
- 2002: Outi Sillanpää
- 2003: Outi Sillanpää
- 2004: Outi Sillanpää
- 2005: Outi Sillanpää
- 2006: Marja Penttinen

=== Cross country ===
- 1960: Siiri Rantanen
- 1961: Eila Mikola
- 1962: Anna-Liisa Hälinen
- 1963: Eeva-Liisa Kalliolahti
- 1964: Eeva-Liisa Kalliolahti
- 1965: Eeva-Liisa Kalliolahti
- 1966: Eeva-Liisa Kalliolahti
- 1967: Eeva-Liisa Kalliolahti
- 1968: Pirjo Vihonen
- 1969: Inkeri Vaara
- 1970: Sirkka Ikäläinen
- 1971: Pirjo Vihonen
- 1972: Irja Pettinen
- 1973: Pirjo Vihonen
- 1974: Pirjo Vihonen
- 1975: Nina Holmén
- 1976: Sinikka Tyynelä
- 1977: Sinikka Tyynelä
- 1978: Elina Pulkkinen
- 1979: Irja Paukkonen
- 1980: Helena Heikkinen
- 1981: Irene Lusikka
- 1982: Helena Heikkinen
- 1983: Tuija Toivonen
- 1984: Tuija Toivonen
- 1985: Tuija Toivonen
- 1986: Päivi Tikkanen
- 1987: Tuija Toivonen
- 1988: Tuija Toivonen
- 1989: Tuija Toivonen
- 1990: Päivi Tikkanen
- 1991: Carita Sunell
- 1992: Carita Sunell
- 1993: Päivi Tikkanen
- 1994: Annemari Sandell-Hyvärinen
- 1995: Annemari Sandell-Hyvärinen
- 1996: Annemari Sandell-Hyvärinen
- 1997: Annemari Sandell-Hyvärinen
- 1998: Päivi Tikkanen
- 1999: Annemari Sandell-Hyvärinen
- 2000: Annemari Sandell-Hyvärinen
- 2001: Annemari Sandell-Hyvärinen
- 2002: Marjo Venäläinen
- 2003: Johanna Lehtinen
- 2004: Johanna Lehtinen
- 2005: Maija Oravamäki
- 2006: Annemari Sandell-Hyvärinen
