= Kankaanpää (disambiguation) =

Kankaanpää is a town and municipality of Finland.

Kankaanpää may also refer to:

- Kankaanpää, Säkylä, a village in Finland
- Katja Kankaanpää (born 1981), Finnish mixed martial artist
- Tiina Kankaanpää (born 1976), Finnish discus thrower
