= Kirwa =

Kirwa is a surname of Kenyan origin. Notable people with the surname include:

- Alfred Kirwa Yego (born 1986), Kenyan middle-distance runner
- Eunice Kirwa (born 1984), Kenyan-Bahraini distance runner
- Francis Kirwa (born 1974), Kenyan-Finnish marathon runner
- Gilbert Kirwa (born 1985), Kenyan marathon runner
- Henry Kiprono Kirwa, Kenyan Paralympic distance runner
- Julius Kirwa (born 1989), Kenyan sprinter
- Kipruto Rono Arap Kirwa, Kenyan politician
- Leonard Kirwa Kosencha (born 1994), Kenyan middle-distance runner
- Solomon Kirwa Yego (born 1987), Kenyan half marathon runner
- Wilson Kirwa (born 1974), Kenyan-Finnish distance runner and writer
