= Rajamäki =

Rajamäki may refer to:

== Place ==
- Rajamäki (village), Finland

== Surname ==
- Antti Rajamäki (born 1952), Finnish sprinter
- Kari Rajamäki (born 1948), Finnish politician
- Marko Rajamäki (born 1968), Finnish football manager
- Susanna Rajamäki (born 1979), Finnish athlete
