= Simola =

Simola may refer to:

- Simola (surname)
- Simola in Rovaniemi, Finland
- Raippo - Simola in Lappeenranta, Finland
- Simola Golf Course near Knysna, South Africa
