= Karijoki =

Karijoki Bötom
- Municipality
- Karijoen kunta Bötoms kommun
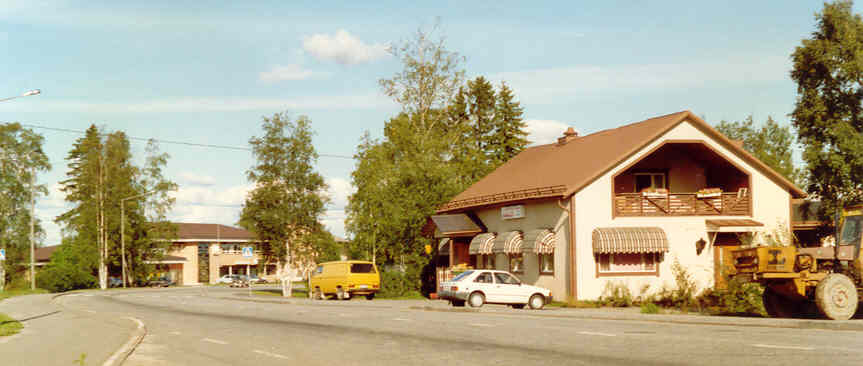
- Karijoki in 1990

- Coat of arms

- Location of Karijoki in Finland
- Interactive map of Karijoki
- Coordinates: 62°18.5′N 021°42.5′E
- Country: Finland
- Region: South Ostrobothnia
- Sub-region: Suupohja

Government
  - Municipal manager: Marko Keski-Sikkilä

Area (2018-01-01)
  - Total: 186.54 km^{2} (72.02 sq mi)
  - Land: 185.58 km^{2} (71.65 sq mi)
  - Water: 0.78 km^{2} (0.30 sq mi)
  - Rank: 267th largest in Finland

Population (2025-12-31)
  - Total: 1,134
  - Rank: 287th largest in Finland
  - Density: 6.11/km^{2} (15.8/sq mi)

Population by native language
  - Finnish: 95.1% (official)
  - Swedish: 2.1%
  - Others: 2.7%

Population by age
  - 0 to 14: 11.4%
  - 15 to 64: 52.4%
  - 65 or older: 36.3%
- Time zone: UTC+02:00 (EET)
  - Summer (DST): UTC+03:00 (EEST)
- Website: karijoki.fi

Karijoki (Finnish: [ˈkɑriˌjoki]; Swedish: Bötom) is a municipality of Finland. It is part of the South Ostrobothnia region. The population of Karijoki is 1,134 (December 31, 2025), which makes it the smallest municipality in South Ostrobothnia in terms of population. The municipality covers an area of 185.58 km^{2} (71.65 sq mi) of which 0.78 km^{2} (0.30 sq mi) is inland water (January 1, 2018). The population density is 6.11/km^{2} (15.8/sq mi). The municipality is unilingually Finnish.

A proposed neanderthal cave, Susiluola, was found in the Pyhävuori mountains in Karijoki in 1997.

== Villages ==
- Alakylä
- Karijoen kirkonkylä
- Myrkky
- Ylikylä

== Demographics ==
Historical population
Year	Pop.	±%
1950	3,378	—
1960	2,998	−11.2%
1970	2,377	−20.7%
1980	2,038	−14.3%
1990	1,982	−2.7%
2000	1,760	−11.2%
2010	1,521	−13.6%
2020	1,207	−20.6%
Source: Doria, Statistics Finland

== Notable people ==
- Antti Rajamäki, former sprinter
- Pentti Lund, ice hockey player
- Susanna Rajamäki, athlete
