= Veli-Pekka Kokkonen =

Finnish high jumper (born 1966)

Veli-Pekka Kokkonen (born 19 July 1966 in Kerava) is a Finnish retired high jumper. He became Finnish champion in 1988. His personal best jump was 2.23 metres (7 ft 4 in), achieved in June 1992 in Tuusula.
