= Olavi Suomalainen =

Finnish long-distance runner

Heikki Olavi Suomalainen (born 27 March 1947 in Sääminki) is a Finnish former marathon runner. He won the Boston Marathon in 1972 by an 18-second margin over Víctor Mora. In 1973 he finished third at the same race.

During his career, Olavi Suomalainen sustained injuries and failed to qualify for the Summer Olympics or European Championships in Athletics. He took the bronze medal at the Finnish Championship Marathon in the Olympic years 1972 and 1976. However, in 1976 gold medalist Håkan Spik, silver medalist Jukka Toivola, and Lasse Virén were nominated to the Olympic Marathon.

Suomalainens winning time 2:15:39 at the 1972's Boston Marathon remained his personal best. Olavi Suomalainen has a Master of Science in Engineering.

== Achievements ==
Year	Competition	Venue	Position	Notes
Representing Finland
1972	Boston Marathon	Boston, United States	1st	2:15:39
