= Simola (surname) =

Simola is a Finnish surname. Notable people with the surname include:

- Seppo Simola (1936–2003), Finnish shot putter
- Seija Simola (1944–2017), Finnish singer
- Mika Simola (born 1985), Finnish racing cyclist
