= Susiluola Cave =

Cave and archaeological site in Finland

Susiluola
- Varggrottan (Swedish)
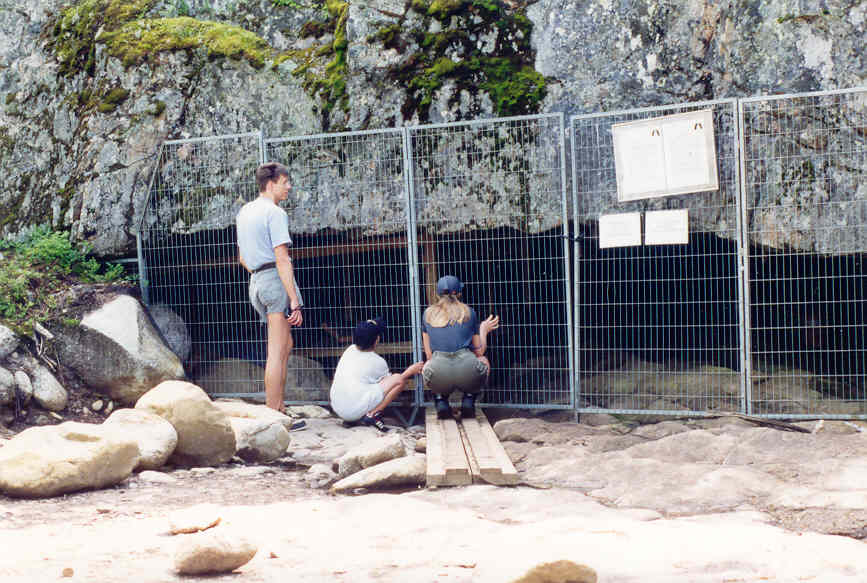
- The entrance to the Wolf Cave

- Location in Finland
- Interactive map of Susiluola
- 62°18′10″N 21°39′39″E
- Type: Limestone
- Periods: Paleolithic
- Cultures: Mousterian
- Associated with: Neanderthal
- Location: Kristinestad
- Region: Kristinestad municipality in Finland

Site notes
- Length: 25 m (82.02 ft)
- Area: 400 m^{2} (4,305.56 sq ft)
- Excavation dates: 1997 to 2000, 2004

Susiluola (Swedish: Varggrottan, 'Wolf Cave') is a crack in the Pyhävuori hill (Swedish: Bötombergen) at the border of Kristinestad and Karijoki municipalities in Finland. The upper part of the crack forms a cave that was until recently packed with soil. In 1996, some objects were found here that brought about speculations that it could have been inhabited in the Paleolithic, between 120,000 and 130,000 years ago. These objects, if authentic, would be the only known Neanderthal artifacts in the Nordic countries.

== Excavation history ==
In 1996, plans were made to empty the cave of soil and turn it into a tourist attraction, but during the process, stone objects that might have been created by humans were found and the work to empty the cave was halted. In 1997, an excavation of the cave was begun as a collaboration between the National Board of Antiquities, the Geological Survey of Finland, the Department of Geology of the University of Helsinki, and the Finnish Museum of Natural History. This excavation lasted until 2000, and was focused on determining the age of the materials, finding out if similar items could be found elsewhere in Europe, and reconstructing the prehistoric surroundings. The results were presented in a 2002 report.

Work was interrupted in 2001, because of the risk that the cave was about to collapse, in part as a result of the excavation itself, but the cave was stabilized in 2002, and a protecting wire netting of steel was set up to prevent chips of stone from falling. In 2003, a follow-up was carried out, and in 2004, the National Board of Antiquities received funds to start a three-year research project. Work began again later that year, and in the following years, excavations took place in the early summer each year.

== Findings ==
After eight summers of digging, about 200 artifacts, some 600 pieces of strike waste, scrapers and bolt stone, and heated stones from an open fire have been found. The objects are made of various materials, including siltstone, quartz, quartzite, volcanic rock, jasper and sandstone; as siltstone and quartzite do not occur naturally in the area, at least some of these must have come from elsewhere.

The ground in Susiluola consists of at least eight layers, of which the fourth and the fifth are the geologically and archeologically most interesting. The stone material that has been found appears to have been worked with several different techniques—tools of stone with good processing structure, such as fine-grained quartzite and red siltstone, have been worked in a way that is typical of the Middle Paleolithic, and probably of the Mousterian type, while quartz, other quartzite, and sandstone have been worked with the earlier Clactonian technique.

Large quantities of bones from mammals and their prey have also been found, mostly in the upper layers of the cave, though it is not certain that any of the bone material dates from before the last ice age.

== Criticism ==
There is disagreement as to whether Neanderthals actually settled in the cave. In 2006, Joakim Donner, Professor Emeritus in Geology and Paleontology, published in the journal Tieteessä tapahtuu criticisms of the idea that the materials found in the cave were created by humans. Donner claims not only that stones from Susiluola are not similar to Neanderthal objects found in France, but also that the cave was located under water during the time period in question, and that there is no proof that fire was made there.

Hans-Peter Schulz of the National Board of Antiquities has defended the findings, saying that it is very possible that the cave was situated above water level at the time, and that soot from the fireplace that has been found is over 40,000 years old and cannot have come from outside the cave. The justification that the pieces of stone found in the cave are actually products of human beings is, according to Schulz, that the objects have been exposed to a rapid and aimed blow, leaving a surface that does not look similar to one that has been exposed to exogenous processes, but does resemble those of man-made objects from the Paleolithic found in central Europe. The debate was widely reported in the press.

In 2007, several critical papers from Finnish geologists and archaeologists were published in the archaeological journal Fennoscandia archaeologica (vol. XXIV). The authors in question were not convinced that the finds and features found in the cave are man-made. Debate continued until 2016, after which the site fell out of mainstream academic discussion.
