= Tina Rättyä =

Finnish heptathlete

Personal information
- Born: 12 November 1968 (age 57) Jakobstad, Ostrobothnia, Finland

Sport
- Sport: Heptathlon

Tina Maria Rättyä (born 12 November 1968) is a retired Finnish heptathlete, who was nicknamed Tinuli. She is the cousin of Susann Sundqvist.

She finished thirteenth at the 1991 World Championships and the 1993 World Championships, tenth at the 1994 European Indoor Championships, eighth at the 1994 European Championships and sixteenth at the 1995 World Championships.
