= Tuula Rautanen =

Finnish sprinter (born 1942)

Personal information
- Nationality: Finnish
- Born: 8 April 1942 (age 83)

Sport
- Sport: Sprinting
- Event: 100 metres

Tuula Rautanen (born 8 April 1942) is a Finnish sprinter. She competed in the women's 100 metres at the 1972 Summer Olympics.
