= Börje Strand =

Finnish sprinter

Personal information
- Full name: Börje Kalevi Strand
- Nationality: Finnish
- Born: 23 September 1935 Helsinki, Finland
- Died: 30 April 1977 (aged 41) Helsinki, Finland

Sport
- Sport: Sprinting
- Event: 4 × 400 metres relay

Börje Kalevi Strand (23 September 1935 – 30 April 1977) was a Finnish sprinter. He competed in the men's 4 × 400 metres relay at the 1960 Summer Olympics.
