= Sinikka Tyynelä =

Finnish middle-distance runner

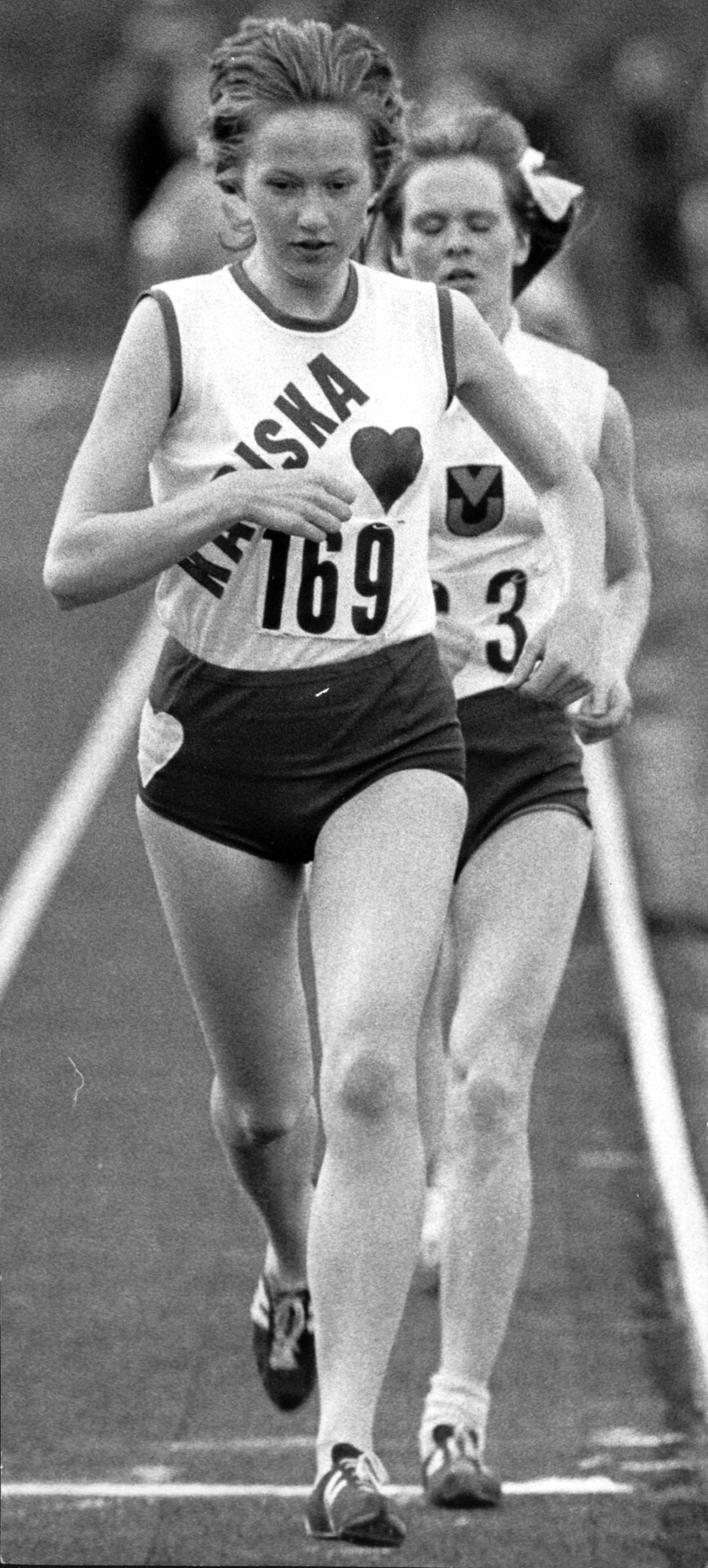
- Sinikka Tyynelä in May 1972.

Personal information
- Nationality: Finnish
- Born: 17 March 1954 (age 72) Laitila

Sport
- Sport: Middle-distance running
- Event: 1500 metres

Sinikka Marjatta Tyynelä, married Kontu (born 17 March 1954), is a Finnish middle-distance runner. She competed in the women's 1500 metres at the 1972 Summer Olympics.
