= Kimmo Pallonen =

Finnish pole vaulter (born 1959)

Kimmo Pallonen (born 17 January 1959 in Jyväskylän maalaiskunta) is a retired male pole vaulter from Finland. His personal best jump was 5.56 metres, achieved in July 1982 in Raahe. He became Finnish champion in 1979, 1981, 1984 and 1985.

== Achievements ==
Year	Competition	Venue	Position	Notes
1979	European Indoor Championships	Vienna, Austria	12th	
1984	European Indoor Championships	Gothenburg, Sweden	11th	
1984	Olympic Games	Los Angeles, United States	5th	
1985	World Indoor Games	Paris, France	8th	
1987	European Indoor Championships	Liévin, France	14th	
