= Minna Vehmasto =

Finnish high jumper

Minna Vehmasto (born 28 March 1962 in Kuusjoki) is a retired Finnish high jumper.

She finished twelfth at the 1983 World Championships. She was Finnish champion in 1980, 1981, and 1983.

Her personal best jump was 1.91 metres, achieved in July 1983 in Pori.
