= Jussi Rintamäki =

Finnish sprinter

Personal information
- Nationality: Finnish
- Born: 4 July 1935 Ilmajoki, Finland
- Died: 21 March 2025 (aged 89) Hämeenlinna, Finland

Sport
- Sport: Sprinting
- Event: 4 × 400 metres relay

Jussi Rintamäki (4 July 1935 – 21 March 2025) was a Finnish sprinter. He competed in the men's 4 × 400 metres relay at the 1960 Summer Olympics.
