= Simo Saloranta =

Finnish long-distance runner

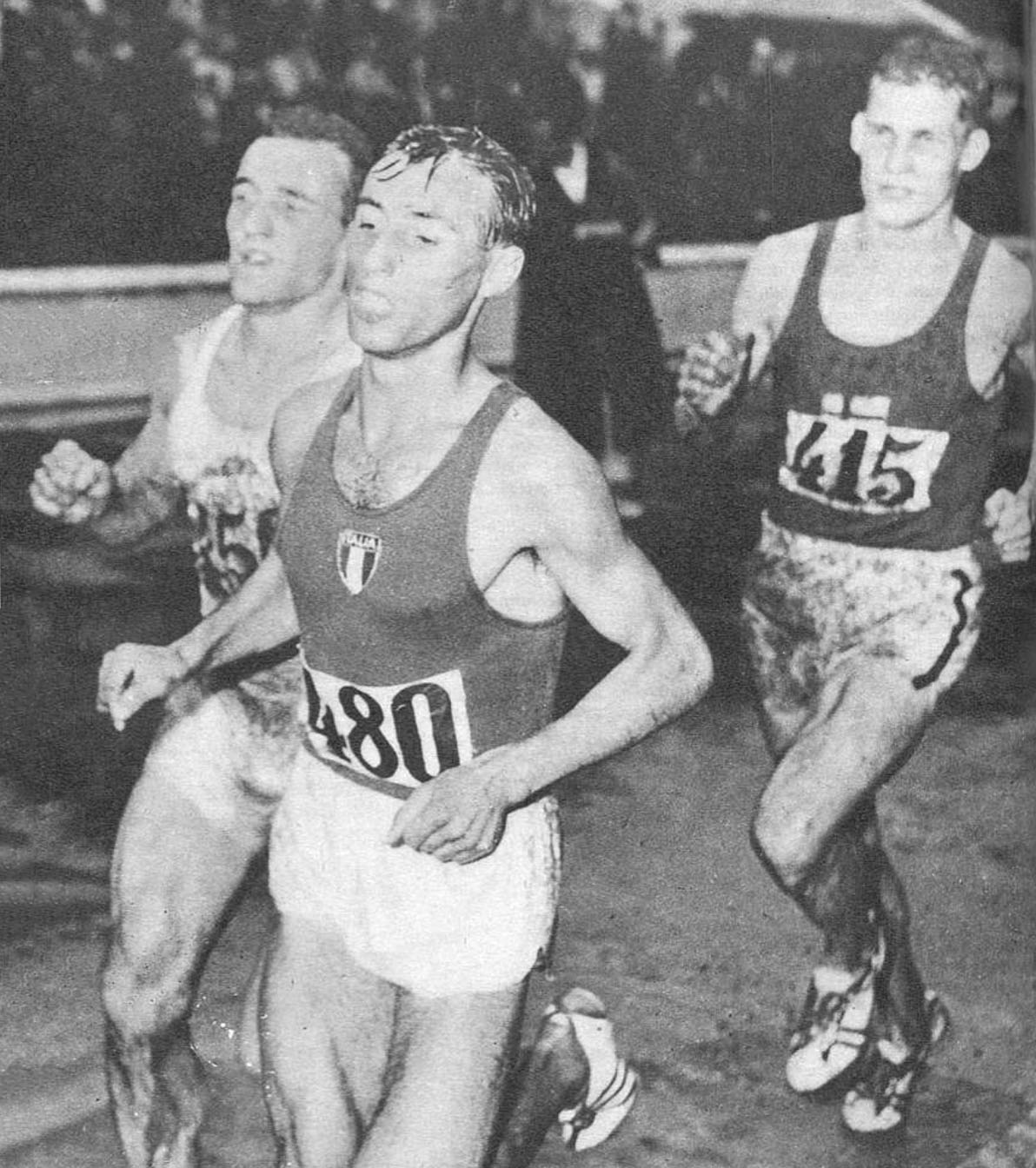
- Finnish runner Simo Saloranta (right) following Italy's Volpi and Germany's Müller in Rome, 1959

Personal information
- Full name: Simo Sakari Saloranta
- Nationality: Finnish
- Born: 12 December 1934 Lieto, Finland
- Died: 8 November 2017 (aged 82)

Sport
- Sport: Long-distance running
- Event: 5000 metres

Simo Saloranta (12 December 1934 – 8 November 2017) was a Finnish long-distance runner. He competed in the 5000 metres at the 1960 Summer Olympics and the 1964 Summer Olympics.
