= Antero Lindman =

Finnish racewalker

Personal information
- Nationality: Finnish
- Born: 25 December 1964 (age 61)

Sport
- Sport: Athletics
- Event: Racewalking

Antero Lindman (born 25 December 1964) is a Finnish racewalker. He competed in the men's 50 kilometres walk at the 1996 Summer Olympics.
