= Johannes Lahti =

Finnish decathlete

Johannes Kristian Lahti (May 29, 1952 in Turku – March 1, 2017) was a male decathlete from Finland, who was nicknamed "Jonski". He set his personal best (8090 points) in 1978. Lahti became national champion in the decathlon in 1980 and 1982.

== Achievements ==
Year	Competition	Venue	Position	Notes
Representing Finland
1976	Olympic Games	Montréal, Canada	11th	7708 points
1980	Olympic Games	Moscow, Soviet Union	11th	7765 points
