= Eeva Haimi =

Finnish sprinter (born 1945)

Personal information
- Nationality: Finnish
- Born: 15 December 1945 (age 79)

Sport
- Sport: Sprinting
- Event: 400 metres

Eeva Haimi (born 15 December 1945) is a Finnish sprinter. She competed in the women's 400 metres at the 1968 Summer Olympics.
