= Leena Kaarna =

Finnish high jumper

Personal information
- Nationality: Finnish
- Born: 26 November 1939 (age 86) Lappeenranta, Finland

Sport
- Sport: Athletics
- Event: High jump

Leena Kaarna (born 26 November 1939) is a Finnish athlete. She competed in the women's high jump at the 1964 Summer Olympics.
