= Jaakko Tuominen =

Finnish hurdler (1944–2001)

Personal information
- Nationality: Finnish
- Born: 4 May 1944 Orimattila, Finland
- Died: 27 October 2001 (aged 57) Astoria, Oregon, U.S.

Sport
- Sport: Track and field
- Event: 400 metres hurdles

Jaakko Tuominen (4 May 1944 – 27 October 2001) was a Finnish hurdler. He competed in the 400 metres hurdles at the 1964 Summer Olympics and the 1968 Summer Olympics, where he was the captain of the track team. Tuominen moved with his family to the United States in the early 1990s.
