= Pentti Kuukasjärvi =

Finnish triple jumper

Personal information
- Nationality: Finnish
- Born: 28 November 1946 (age 79)

Sport
- Sport: Athletics
- Event: Triple jump

Pentti Kuukasjärvi (born 28 November 1946) is a Finnish athlete. He competed in the men's triple jump at the 1976 Summer Olympics.
