= Helle Aro =

Estonian athlete

Personal information
- Nationality: Estonian-Finnish
- Born: 9 December 1960 (age 64) Rapla, Estonia

Sport
- Sport: Athletics
- Event: Heptathlon

Helle Aro (born 9 December 1960) is an Estonian athlete. She competed for Finland in the women's heptathlon at the 1992 Summer Olympics.
