= Olli Pousi =

Finnish triple jumper

Personal information
- Nationality: Finnish
- Born: 23 July 1959 (age 66) Espoo, Finland

Sport
- Sport: Athletics
- Event: Triple jump

Olli Pousi (born 23 July 1959) is a retired Finnish triple jumper. He competed in the men's triple jump at the 1980 Summer Olympics albeit without registering a valid mark.
