= Kankaanpää, Säkylä =

Kankaanpää
- Village
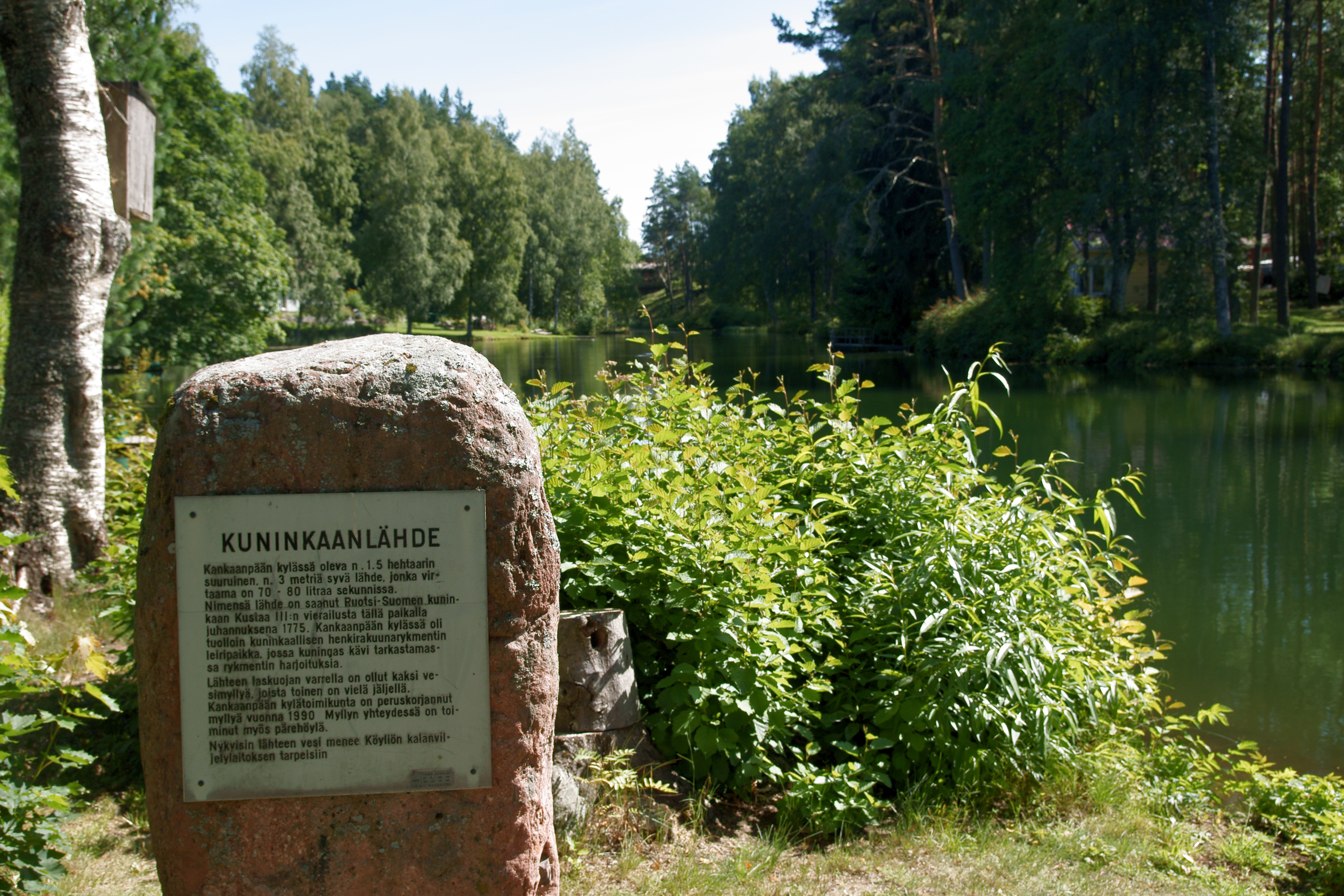
- Kuninkaanlähde in Kankaanpää.

- Location in Finland
- Coordinates: 61°4′50.9″N 22°22′57.4″E
- Country: Finland
- Region: Satakunta
- Municipality: Säkylä
- Time zone: UTC+2 (EET)
  - Summer (DST): UTC+3 (EEST)

Kankaanpää is a village in the municipality of Säkylä, Finland. It was previously located in the former municipality of Köyliö. There is a Royal Fountain in Kankaanpää, which was named after King Gustav III of Sweden.

To avoid confusion with the city of Kankaanpää, Kankaanpää's post office name was confirmed with the name Kakkuri.

== Services ==
There are only a few services in Kankaanpää, including: Lalli School and Retirement Home. In spring 2009, Tarmo Convenience Store closed and an OP office is located in the same property. There is also an old Köyliö Dairy in Kankaanpää, which has not been in business for many years, but was bought by Maarit Markkula in May 2013 and intends to maintain it due to its historical value.

== Directions ==
There are good road connections to Kankaanpää, as it passes through the connecting road 2044, which begins in Säkylä and ends in Vuorenmaa. Also, it arises in highway 12 for passing connecting road 2131.
