= Kaisa Launela =

Finnish javelin thrower

Personal information
- Nationality: Finnish
- Born: 13 May 1948 (age 78)

Sport
- Sport: Athletics
- Event: Javelin throw

Kaisa Launela (born 13 May 1948) is a Finnish athlete. She competed in the women's javelin throw at the 1968 Summer Olympics.
