= Mikko Ala-Leppilampi =

Finnish middle-distance runner

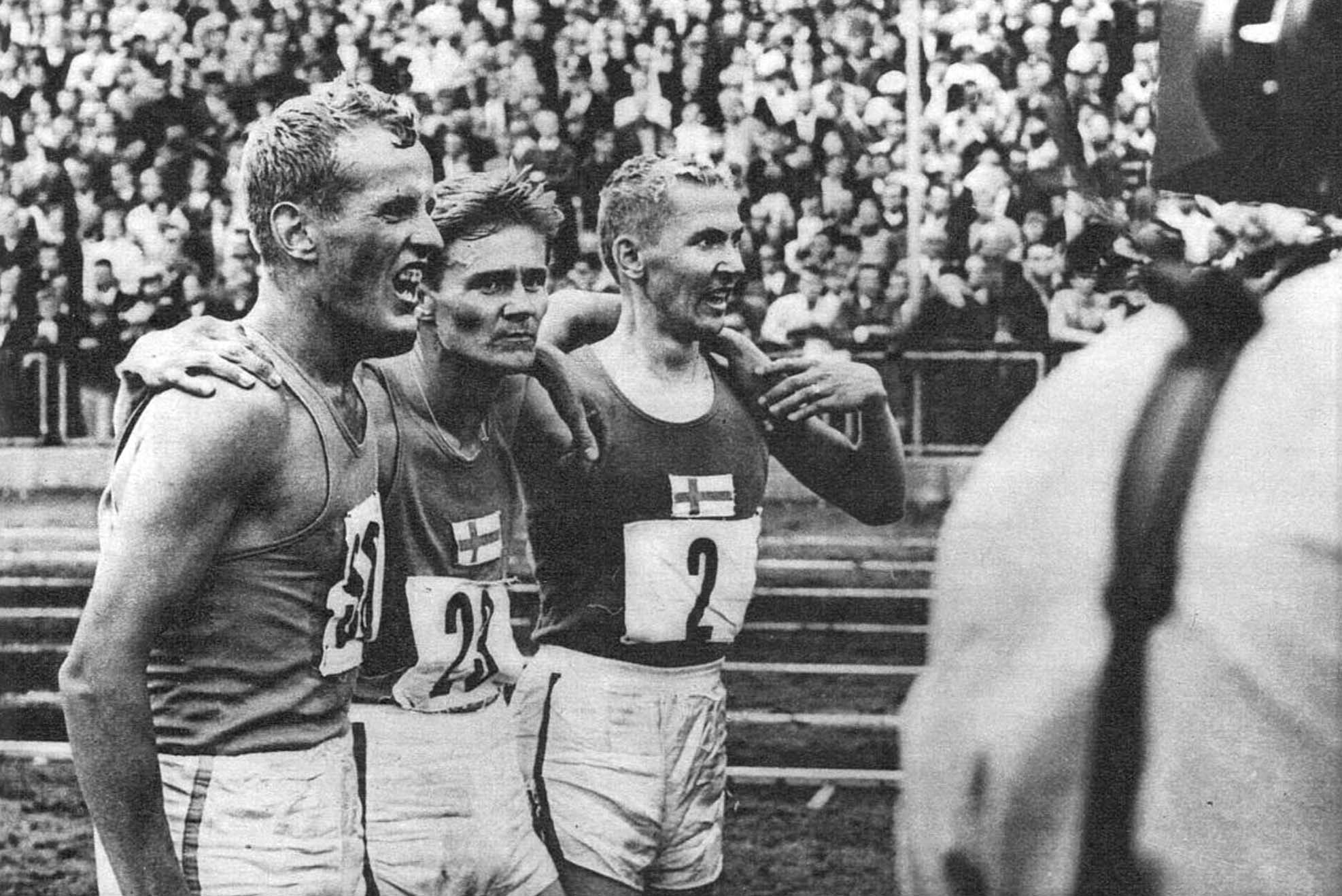
- Mikko Ala-Leppilampi (right), 1967

Personal information
- Full name: Mikko Juhani Ala-Leppilampi
- Nationality: Finnish
- Born: 24 July 1943 Kannus, Finland
- Died: 22 February 2005 (aged 61) Pihtipudas, Finland

Sport
- Sport: Middle-distance running
- Event: Steeplechase

Mikko Juhani Ala-Leppilampi (24 July 1943 – 22 February 2005) was a Finnish middle-distance runner. He competed in the men's 3000 metres steeplechase at the 1972 Summer Olympics.
