= Seppo Hovinen =

Finnish javelin thrower (born 1951)

Seppo Juhani Hovinen (born February 4, 1951, in Virrat) is a retired Finnish javelin thrower. A leading favorite in the 1976 Montréal Olympics, he failed to deliver, finishing 7th.

== Rise to elite ==
Hovinen exploded to international attention in the mid-70s and was ranked #1 in the world by Track & Field News in 1975. Resultwise though, his best year by far was 1976, which saw him winning his first Finnish championship and throwing 90 meters or more in seemingly every competition, culminating in his personal best of 93.54 thrown in Helsinki on June 23, 1976. This was very close to the world record, held at the time at 94.08 by Klaus Wolfermann. Hovinen entered the 1976 Summer Olympics as a leading favorite, together with Miklós Németh of Hungary.

== 1976 Summer Olympics ==
Hovinen cleared the qualification easily, throwing 89.76 with his first throw. Though Finland has produced no less than seven Olympic gold medalists in the javelin (including Julius Saaristo's gold in the 1912 two hands competition), this still remains the longest throw ever by a Finn at an Olympics. It was also the longest of the qualification, narrowly ahead of Németh.

Next day in the final however, Németh opened with a new world record of 94.58. Hovinen found himself completely unable to respond, and finished a very disappointing seventh with a lackluster mark of 84.26.

== 1977 doping positive and further career ==
After winning another Finnish championship in 1977, Hovinen tested positive for anabolic steroids (together with fellow Finns Markku Tuokko and Asko Pesonen) at the 1977 European Cup in Helsinki. He was initially given a lifetime ban by IAAF, but this was reduced on an appeal by the Finnish Athletics Association (SUL) and Hovinen became eligible to compete again on August 13, 1978, just in time to take part in the 1978 European Athletics Championships. He cleared the qualification with his first throw but failed again in the final, taking the middle spot as team Finland swept the last three places.

Hovinen never returned to his 1976 shape, though he won one more Finnish championship in 1981. He is married to Ulla Lundholm, the Finnish record holder in women's discus throw; they are the parents of Niko Hovinen.

== See also ==
- List of sportspeople sanctioned for doping offences
