= Pentti Repo =

Finnish discus thrower

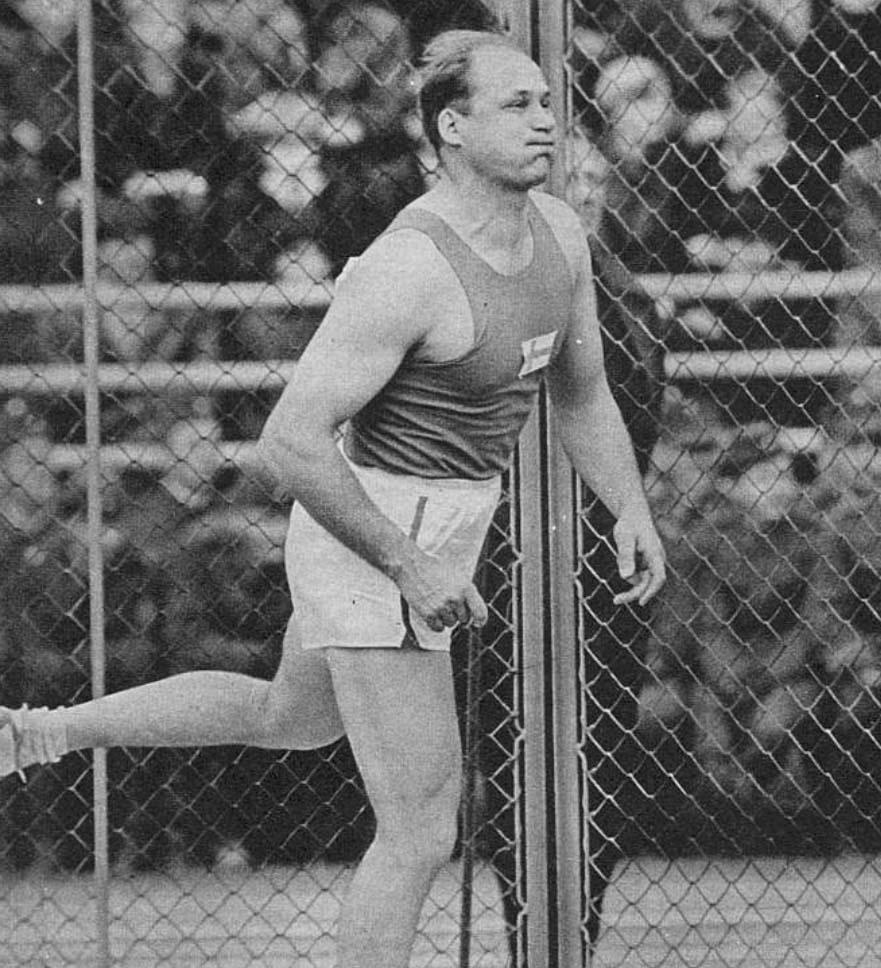

Personal information
- Nationality: Finnish
- Born: 23 October 1930
- Died: 27 October 1997 (aged 67)

Sport
- Sport: Athletics
- Event: Discus throw

Pentti Repo (23 October 1930 – 27 October 1997) was a Finnish athlete. He competed in the men's discus throw at the 1960 Summer Olympics and the 1964 Summer Olympics.

== Track record ==
- 9th place at the Olympics 1960
- 9th place in the European Championships 1958
- Finnish champion: 1959, 1960, 1962, 1963, 1964, 1965, 1966
- Finnish Championship silver: 1957, 1958
- Finnish Championship bronze: 1961
