= Jussi Utriainen =

Finnish long-distance runner

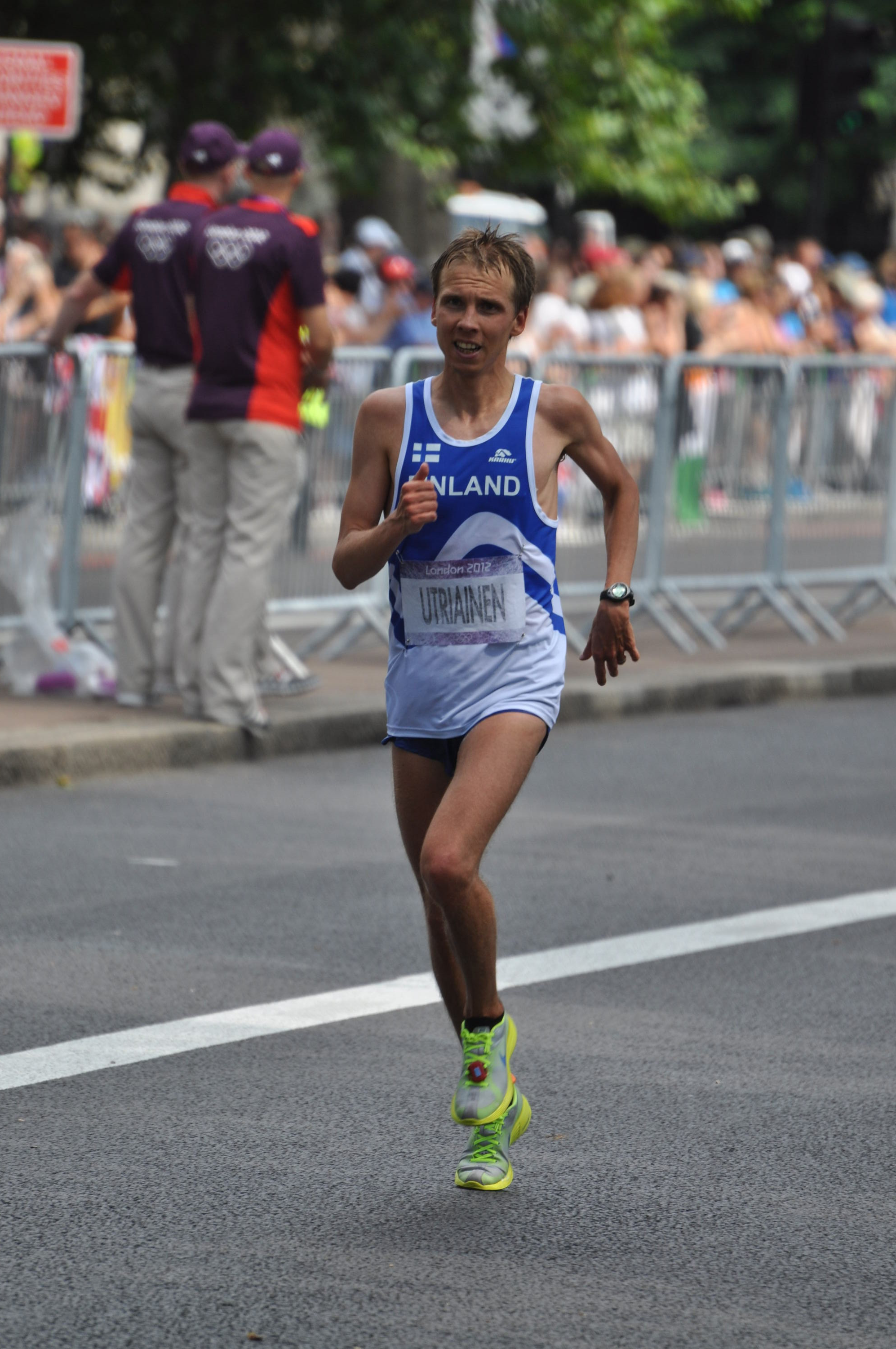
- Utriainen in the marathon at the 2012 Olympics in London

Personal information
- Born: November 28, 1978 (age 47) Kuopio
- Height: 1.75 m (5 ft 9 in)
- Weight: 57 kg (126 lb)

Sport
- Country: Finland
- Sport: Athletics
- Event: Marathon

Jussi Pekka Utriainen is a Finnish long-distance runner. At the 2012 Summer Olympics, he competed in the Men's marathon, finishing in 69th place.
