= Kirsi Valasti =

Finnish long-distance runner

Personal information
- Full name: Kirsi Eva Marika Valasti
- Nationality: Finnish
- Born: 12 November 1969 (age 56)

Sport
- Sport: Long-distance running
- Event: 5000 metres

Kirsi Eva Marika Valasti (born 12 November 1969) is a Finnish long-distance runner. She competed in the women's 5000 metres at the 2004 Summer Olympics.
