= Pentti Rummakko =

Finnish long-distance runner

Personal information
- Nationality: Finnish
- Born: 12 October 1943 Saarijärvi, Finland
- Died: 9 December 2008 (aged 65) Jyväskylä, Finland

Sport
- Sport: Long-distance running
- Event: Marathon

Pentti Rummakko (12 October 1943 – 9 December 2008) was a Finnish long-distance runner. He competed in the marathon at the 1968 Summer Olympics.
