= Henrik Hellén =

Finnish high jumper (1939–1998)

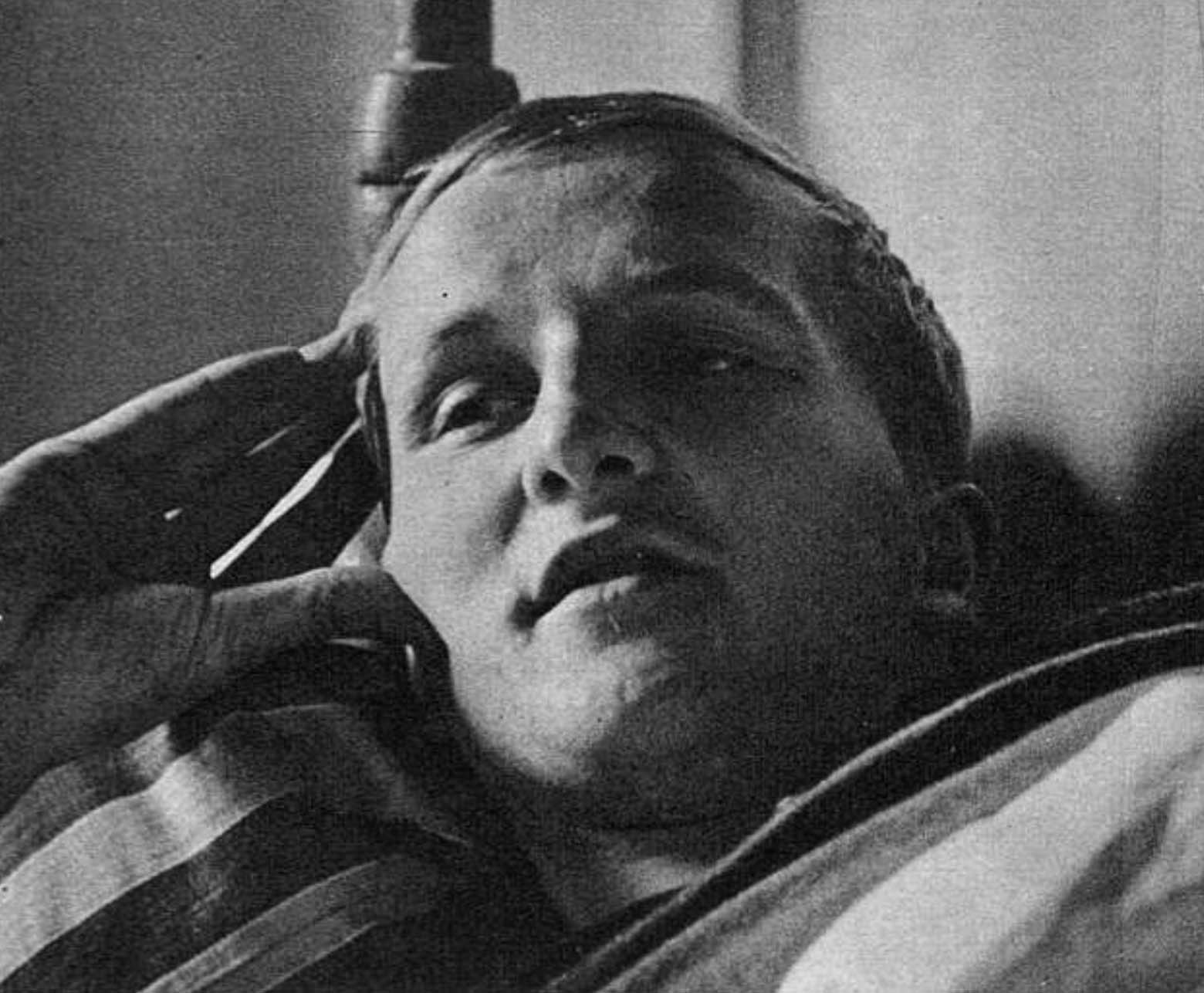

Personal information
- Nationality: Finnish
- Born: 20 December 1939 Dragsfjärd, Finland
- Died: 5 May 1998 (aged 58) Bromma, Sweden

Sport
- Sport: Athletics
- Event: High jump

Johan Henrik Hellén (20 December 1939 – 5 May 1998) was a Finnish athlete. He competed in the men's high jump at the 1964 Summer Olympics.
