= Ari Väänänen =

Finnish former long jumper (born 1947)

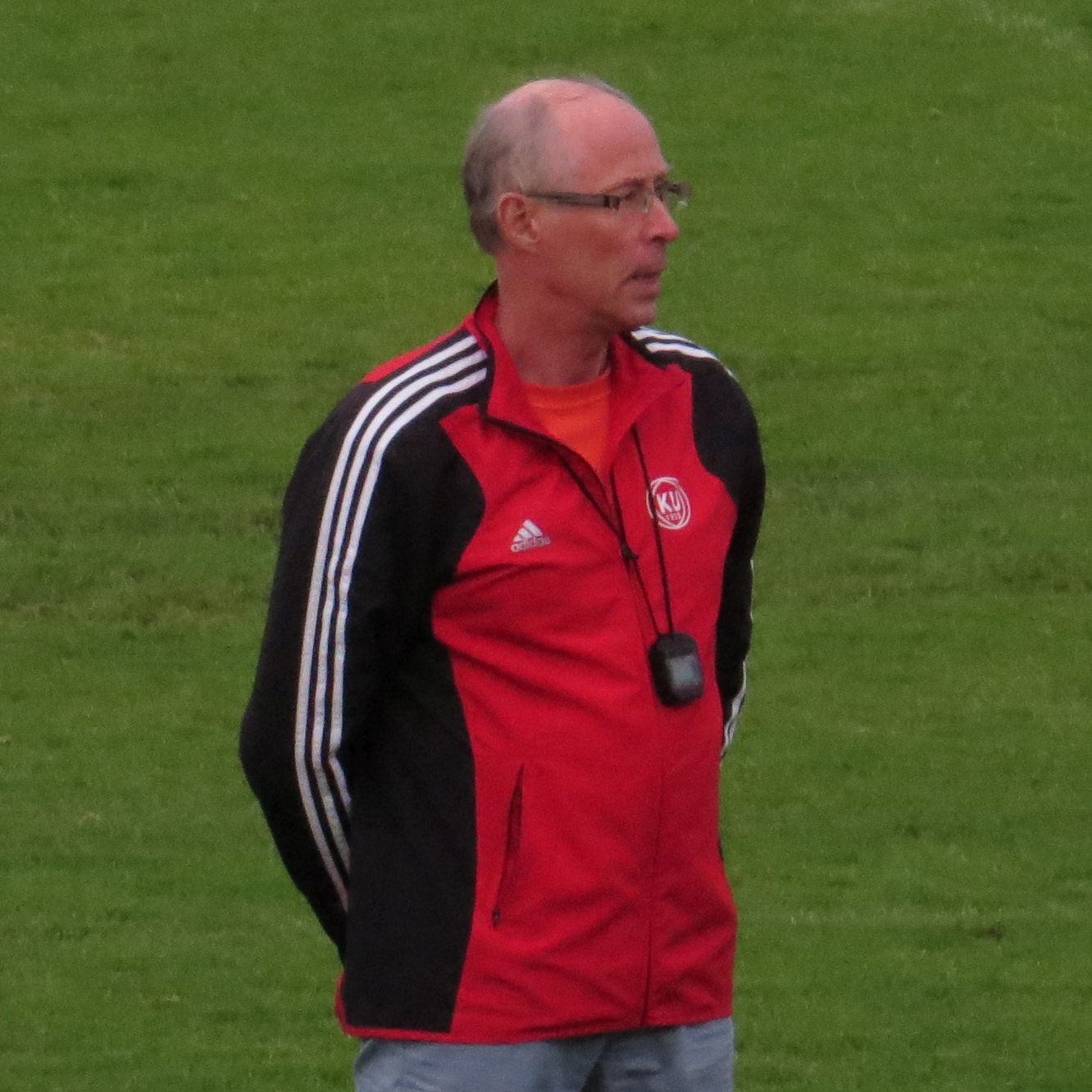
Ari Väänänen

Ari Väänänen (born 26 August 1947) is a Finnish former long jumper who competed in the 1972 Summer Olympics.
