= Sirkka Norrlund =

Finnish hurdler (1943–2022)

Personal information
- Nationality: Finnish
- Born: 8 March 1943 Vaasa, Finland
- Died: 21 September 2022 (aged 79) Vaasa, Finland

Sport
- Sport: Track and field
- Event: 80 metres hurdles

Sirkka Norrlund (8 March 1943 – 21 September 2022) was a Finnish hurdler. She competed in the women's 80 metres hurdles at the 1964 Summer Olympics.
