= Kirsi Mykkänen =

Finnish sprinter

Personal information
- Nationality: Finnish
- Born: 7 February 1978 (age 47)

Sport
- Sport: Sprinting
- Event: 400 metres

Kirsi Mykkänen (born 7 February 1978) is a Finnish sprinter. She competed in the women's 400 metres at the 2004 Summer Olympics.
