= Jani Lehtinen =

Finnish racewalker

Personal information
- Nationality: Finnish
- Born: 23 February 1974 (age 52) Masku, Finland

Sport
- Sport: Athletics
- Event: Racewalking

Jani Petri Lehtinen (born 23 February 1974) is a Finnish racewalker. He competed in the men's 50 kilometres walk at the 1996 Summer Olympics and the 2004 Summer Olympics.
