= Brita Johansson =

Finnish long jumper (born 1941)

Personal information
- Nationality: Finnish
- Born: 16 September 1941 (age 84) Lapinjärvi, Finland

Sport
- Sport: Athletics
- Event: Long jump

Brita Johansson (born 16 September 1941) is a Finnish athlete. She competed in the women's long jump at the 1960 Summer Olympics.
