= Juha Kivi =

Finnish long jumper

Juha Kivi (born 26 January 1964 in Orivesi) is a retired Finnish long jumper.

He became Finnish champion in 1989 and 1993.

His personal best jump was 8.02 metres, achieved in August 1989 in Tampere.

== Achievements ==
Stuttgart Germany

| Year | Competition | Venue | Position | Notes |
Representing Finland
| 1989 | European Indoor Championships | The Hague, Netherlands | 8th | 7.78 m |
| 1989 | World Indoor Championships | Budapest, Hungary | 10th | 7.54 m |
| 1990 | European Championships | Split, Yugoslavia | 14th (q) | 7.70 m (wind: -1.8 m/s) |
| 1994 | European Championships | Helsinki, Finland | 21st (q) | 7.65 m (wind: +0.2 m/s) |
