= Tapio Kantanen =

Finnish athlete (born 1949)

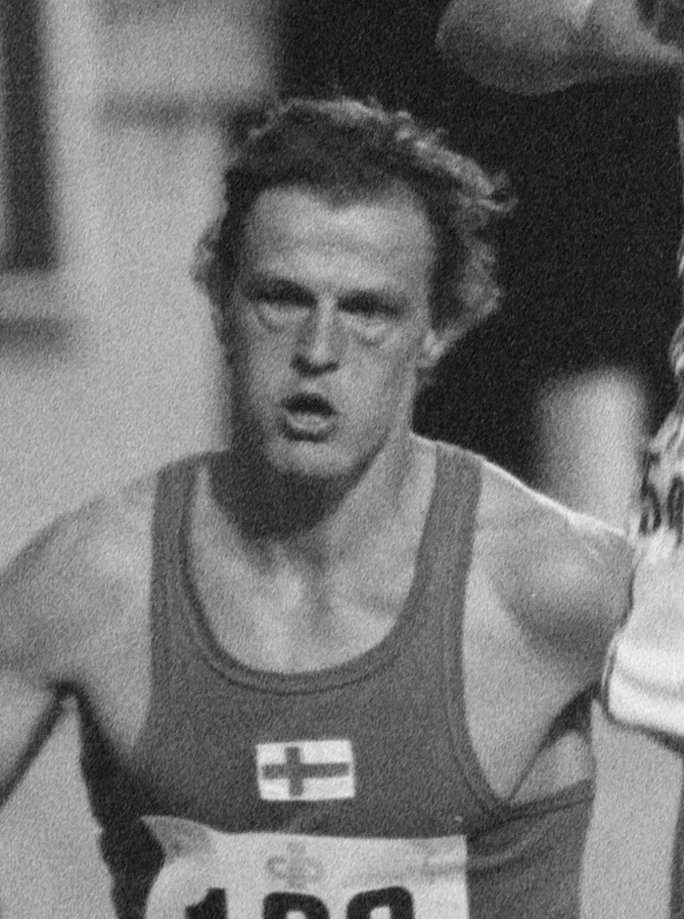
- Kantanen in 1974

Personal information
- Born: 31 May 1949 (age 77) Heinola, Finland

Sport
- Country: Finland
- Sport: Athletics
Medal record
Men's athletics
Representing Finland
Olympic Games
| Bronze medal – third place | 1972 Munich | 3000m steeplechase |

Tapio Kantanen (born 31 May 1949) is a Finnish former athlete who mainly competed in the 3,000 metre steeple chase.

He competed for Finland at the 1972 Summer Olympics held in Munich, Germany where he won the bronze medal in the 3,000 metres steeplechase. He also competed in the 5,000 metres at Munich, but did not qualify for the final. At the 1976 Summer Olympics in Montreal, Canada, he finished fourth in the 3,000 metres steeplechase.
