= Markku Laine =

Finnish middle-distance runner

Personal information
- Nationality: Finnish
- Born: 26 May 1955 (age 71)

Sport
- Sport: Middle-distance running
- Event: 1500 metres

Markku Laine (born 26 May 1955) is a Finnish middle-distance runner. He competed in the men's 1500 metres at the 1976 Summer Olympics.
