= Paavo Pystynen =

Finnish long-distance runner (1932–2021)

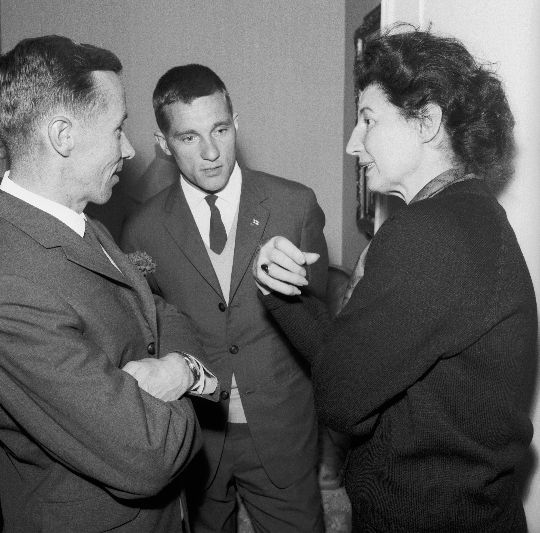
- Paavo Pystynen (center) in 1964

Personal information
- Nationality: Finnish
- Born: 3 February 1932 Hirvensalmi, Finland
- Died: 12 February 2021 (aged 89)

Sport
- Sport: Long-distance running
- Event: Marathon

Paavo Pystynen (3 February 1932 – 12 February 2021) was a Finnish long-distance runner. He competed in the marathon at the 1964 Summer Olympics.
