= Håkan Spik =

Finnish long-distance runner

Personal information
- Nationality: Finnish
- Born: 18 August 1951 (age 74) Kronoby, Finland

Sport
- Sport: Long-distance running
- Event: Marathon

Håkan Spik (born 18 August 1951) is a Finnish long-distance runner. He competed in the marathon at the 1976 Summer Olympics and the 1980 Summer Olympics.
