= Seppo Simola =

Finnish shot putter

Seppo Antero Simola (27 July 1936 in Somero - 9 March 2003) was a Finnish shot putter, who represented Turun Riento, weighing in at 128 kg and standing 191 cm tall. He competed in the men's shot put at the 1972 Summer Olympics.

He was the first Finn to put the shot more than 20 m in an official competition when he put it 20.15 metres in Turku, Finland on 19 July 1972; this was of course his personal best and a national record. Even though Simola was a five-time Finnish champion outdoors and three-time champion indoors, he never placed higher than 16th in the Olympics and 11th in the European Championships.

Simola was one of the first six Finns originally admitted to the 20 meter club when it was founded in April 1983.

== Major achievements ==
Year	Tournament	Venue	Put	Result
1963	Finnish Outdoor Championships		18.00	1st
1964	Finnish Outdoor Championships		18.09	1st
1966	Finnish Indoor Championships		17.80	1st
1970	Finnish Outdoor Championships		18.93	1st
1971	Finnish Indoor Championships		18.64	1st
1971	Finnish Outdoor Championships		18.98	1st
1972	Finnish Indoor Championships		18.87	1st
1972	Finnish Outdoor Championships	Joensuu, Finland	19.81	1st
