= Tiina Kankaanpää =

Finnish discus thrower

Tiina Piia Susanna Kankaanpää (born August 16, 1976 in Seinäjoki) is a retired female discus thrower from Finland. She set her personal best (61.04 metres) on July 11, 1999 at a meet in Jalasjärvi.

== Achievements ==
Year	Competition	Venue	Position	Notes
Representing Finland
1997	European U23 Championships	Turku, Finland	11th	49.98 m
2002	European Championships	Munich, Germany	16th	54.14 m
