= Francis Kirwa =

Finnish marathon runner of Kenyan origin (born 1974)

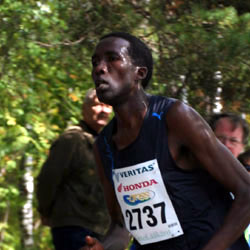
- Kirwa in 2006

Personal information
- Full name: Francis Chepsiror Kirwa
- Nationality: Finland
- Born: 28 November 1974 (age 51) Rift Valley Province, Kenya
- Height: 1.81 m (5 ft 11 1/2 in)
- Weight: 60 kg (132 lb)

Sport
- Sport: Athletics
- Event: Marathon
- Club: Lahden Ahkera (FIN)
- Coached by: Timo Vuorimaa

Achievements and titles
- Personal best: Marathon: 2:11:01 (2008)

Francis Chepsiror Kirwa (born November 28, 1974) is a Finnish marathon runner of Kenyan origin. In 2005, he adopted Finnish nationality in order to compete internationally in the marathon, and run for his home nation at the IAAF World Championships in Helsinki. He also set a personal best of 2:11:01 by winning the gold medal at the Maratona Sant’Antonio in Padua, Italy.

Kirwa represented his adopted nation Finland at the 2008 Summer Olympics in Beijing, where he competed for the men's marathon. He successfully finished the race in fourteenth place by twenty-two seconds behind Spain's José Manuel Martínez, outside his personal best time of 2:14:22.

Kirwa currently resides in Lahti, since he left from Kenya in 2002. He also trains full-time for marathon and cross-country races at Lahden Ahkera, under his personal and head coach Timo Vuorimaa.
