= Susanna Rajamäki =

Finnish heptathlete

Personal information
- Nationality: Finnish
- Born: 19 September 1979 (age 46) Karijoki, Finland

Sport
- Sport: Athletics
- Event: Heptathlon

Susanna Rajamäki (born 19 September 1979) is a Finnish athlete. She competed in the women's heptathlon at the 2000 Summer Olympics.
