= Wilson Kirwa =

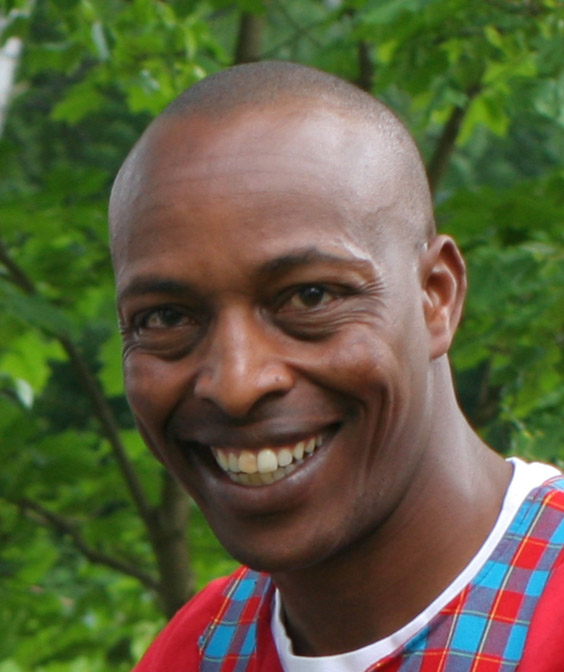
Wilson Kirwa

Wilson Kipchumba Kirwa (born 28 December 1974 in Eldoret, Kenya) is a Finnish middle-distance runner, municipal politician, writer, and entrepreneur.

As a runner, Wilson represents Lahden Ahkera. He is also a National Coalition Party politician and was elected to Lahti city council in 2008 elections. Kirwa belongs to the Kalenjin tribe.

The Kenyan-born Wilson Kirwa moved to Finland in 1997, and in the same year, he started his career as a runner, with his main distance being 800 metres. He originally intended to only tour the country for a few weeks, invited by his Finnish friends. He was 17th in the "Hunajahölkkä" in Pori, even though he was wearing sneakers that were too large. Porin Tarmo requested a year's residence permit for Kirwa. He was also admitted into the Seinäjoki applied crafts school, which encouraged him to stay in Finland.

In 2000, Kirwa made his own record 1:44.69 in the 800 metres in Lappeenranta. Kirwa is the only man to have won the 400, 800, and 1500 metre runs in the same Championship of Finland games. He also has several Championships of Finland in the relay run. Wilson Kirwa has represented Finland in the European Championship and World Championship games and in many Grand Prix games in Europe.

In 2004, Kirwa received Finnish citizenship. In May 2006, Kirwa graduated as a coach from the Pajulahti Sports Academy. He spent the year living in Lahti, training, giving lectures, and writing. He published a fairy tale book called Amani-aasi ja sisäinen kauneus ('Amani the donkey and the inner beauty'), in which he modified the stories he heard in his childhood to suit Finnish people. He has made many visits to schools telling African stories to their child pupils. For the older ones, he tells of arriving and adapting to Finland.

Kirwa joined the National Coalition Party. In 2008 municipal elections, he was elected to the city council of Lahti.

== Achievements ==
- A total of 12 Championship of Finland medals in the 400, 800 and 1500 metres
- 400 m Championship of Finland gold 2000, 2002
- 800 m Championship of Finland gold 1998–2000, 2002, 2004
- 1500 m Championship of Finland gold 2000

== Records ==
- 400 metres 47.31
- 800 metres 1:44.69
- 1500 metres 3:42.63

== Bibliography ==
- Amani-aasi ja sisäinen kauneus (Pieni Karhu, 2005).

== Magazines ==
- Reijo Vaurula: Tie tasamaahiihtäjäksi (Ilo 3/2006).
