= Antti Rajamäki =

Finnish sprinter

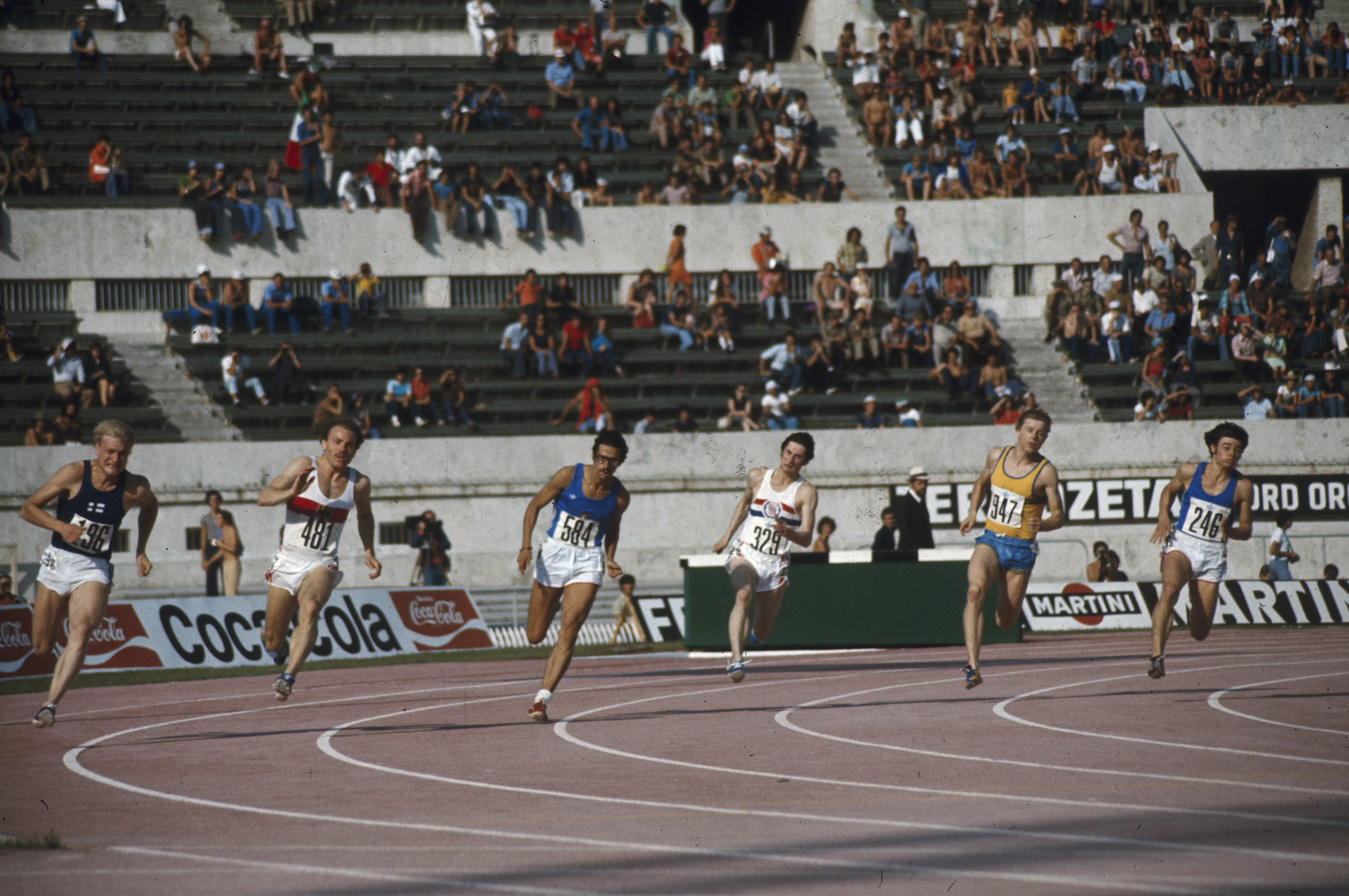
- Antti Rajamäki (first from left) competing at the 1974 European Athletics Championships in Rome

Personal information
- Nationality: Finnish
- Born: 14 July 1952 (age 74)

Sport
- Sport: Sprinting
- Event: 100 metres

Antti Rajamäki (born 14 July 1952) is a Finnish sprinter. He competed in the men's 100 metres at the 1972 Summer Olympics.
