= 1963 Nordic Athletics Championships =

- Host city: Gothenburg, Sweden
- Level: Senior
- Type: Outdoor
- Events: 34
- Records set: 14 championship records

The 1963 Nordic Athletics Championships was the second edition of the international athletics competition between Nordic countries and was held in Gothenburg, Sweden. It consisted of 34 individual athletics events, 22 for men and 12 for women. This covered a track and field programme plus a men's marathon race.

Finland defended its team title in the men's points classification with 225.5 points and Sweden repeated as women's team champions with 104 points. Iceland took part in the men's competition only and was the only nation not to have an athlete top the podium. Among the athletes in attendance were 1962 European Athletics Championships medalists Pentti Nikula, Stig Pettersson, Rainer Stenius and Pentti Eskola.

Ulla-Britt Wieslander of Sweden was the most successful athlete of the tournament, defending both her 100 metres and 200 metres titles as well as adding the 80 metres hurdles championship to her honours. Bengt-Göran Fernström was the only man to win two individual titles, taking the 200 m and 400 metres races. Athletes to successfully defend their 1961 titles were Carl Fredrik Bunæs (100 m), Stig Pettersson (high jump), Stein Haugen (discus), Birger Asplund (hammer), Karen Inge Halkier (shot put) and Nina Hansen (pentathlon).

== Medal summary ==
=== Men ===
Event	Gold		Silver		Bronze	
100 metres	Carl Fredrik Bunæs (NOR)	10.6	Pauli Ny (FIN)	10.7	Sven Hörtevall (SWE)	10.8
200 metres	Bengt-Göran Fernström (SWE)	21.9	Sven-Åke Löfgren (SWE)	22.0	Richard Simonsen (NOR)	22.1
400 metres	Bengt-Göran Fernström (SWE)	47.5	Hans-Olof Johansson (SWE)	48.2	Matti Honkanen (FIN)	48.4
800 metres	Erkki Niemelä (FIN)	1:49.7	Olavi Salonen (FIN)	1:50.0	Pekka Juutilainen (FIN)	1:50.8
1500 metres	Olavi Salonen (FIN)	3:49.0	Sven-Olof Larsson (SWE)	3:49.7	Arne Hamarsland (NOR)	3:51.7
5000 metres	Sven-Olof Larsson (SWE)	14:15.0	Odd Fuglem (NOR)	14:23.6	Reijo Höykinpuro (FIN)	14:24.8
10,000 metres	Jan-Erik Karlsson (SWE)	30:10.8	Simo Saloranta (FIN)	30:10.8	Pål Benum (NOR)	30:14.6
Marathon	Eino Oksanen (FIN)	2:22:01 CR	Paavo Pystynen (FIN)	2:22:07	Eino Valle (FIN)	2:23:40
3000 metres steeplechase	Bengt Persson (SWE)	8:50.2 CR	Esko Sirén (FIN)	8:51.6	Jouko Kuha (FIN)	8:56.8
110 m hurdles	Kjellfred Weum (NOR)	14.9	Juhani Vuori (FIN)	14.9	Raimo Asiala (FIN)	15.0
400 m hurdles	Jaakko Tuominen (FIN)	52.4	Hannu Ehoniemi (FIN)	52.9	Jussi Rintamäki (FIN)	53.2
High jump	Stig Pettersson (SWE)	2.11 m	Kjell-Åke Nilsson (SWE)	2.08 m	Henrik Hellén (FIN)	2.05 m
Pole vault	Pentti Nikula (FIN)	4.72 m CR	Taisto Laitinen (FIN)	4.72 m	Risto Ankio (FIN)	4.60 m
Long jump	Pentti Eskola (FIN)	7.65 m CR	Rainer Stenius (FIN)	7.34 m	Aarre Asiala (FIN)	7.27 m
Triple jump	Yrjö Tamminen (FIN)	15.49 m CR	Martin Jensen (NOR)	15.43 m	Asko Ruuskanen (FIN)	15.33 m
Shot put	Bjørn Bang Andersen (NOR)	17.35 m CR	Matti Yrjölä (FIN)	17.22 m	Erik Uddebom (SWE)	17.20 m
Discus throw	Stein Haugen (NOR)	52.88 m	Niilo Hangasvaara (FIN)	52.80 m	Pentti Repo (FIN)	52.68 m
Hammer throw	Birger Asplund (SWE)	61.06 m	Sverre Strandli (NOR)	60.72 m	Kalevi Horppu (FIN)	60.21 m
Javelin throw	Pauli Nevala (FIN)	78.92 m	Terje Pedersen (NOR)	78.43 m	Gunnar Arntsen (NOR)	76.89 m
Decathlon	Markus Kahma (FIN)	7034 pts	Valbjörn Thorláksson (ISL)	6931 pts	Seppo Suutari (FIN)	6641 pts
4 × 100 m relay	Finland (FIN)	41.0 CR	Denmark (DEN)	42.2	Only two teams finished	
4 × 400 m relay	Sweden (SWE)	3:16.1	Finland (FIN)	3:16.3	Norway (NOR)	3:20.9

=== Women ===
Event	Gold		Silver		Bronze	
100 metres	Ulla-Britt Wieslander (SWE)	11.9 CR	Else Hadrup (DEN)	11.9	Maija Koivusaari (FIN)	12.1
200 metres	Ulla-Britt Wieslander (SWE)	24.4 CR	Else Hadrup (DEN)	24.9	Hilkka Kivistö (FIN)	25.7
400 metres	Hilkka Hivisto (FIN)	57.2	Elisabeth Östberg (SWE)	57.3	Eeva Haimi (FIN)	57.8
800 metres	Yvonne Strandberg (SWE)	2:18.2	Anita Aittala (FIN)	2:18.7	Eeva-Liisa Kalliolahti (FIN)	2:19.4
80 m hurdles	Ulla-Britt Wieslander (SWE)	11.1 CR	Nina Hansen (DEN)	11.4	Sirkka Norrlund (FIN)	11.5
High jump	Berit Larsson (SWE)	1.64 m	Leena Kaarna (FIN)	1.64 m	Pirkko Heikkilä (FIN)	1.55 m
Long jump	Gunilla Cederström (SWE)	5.87 m CR	Berit Tøien (NOR)	5.77 m	Nina Hansen (DEN)	5.68 m
Shot put	Karen Inge Halkier (DEN)	13.70 m	Gun-Britt Flink (SWE)	13.35 m	Eila Ronkonen (FIN)	13.05 m
Discus throw	Wivianne Freivald (SWE)	48.18 m CR	Marjatta Mäkinen (FIN)	47.05 m	Inkeri Lehtonen (FIN)	45.34 m
Javelin throw	Unn Thorvaldsen (NOR)	50.10 m	Raija Talvensaari (FIN)	45.99 m	Britt Johansson (SWE)	45.42 m
Pentathlon	Nina Hansen (DEN)	4513 pts CR	Lena Kindberg (SWE)	4202 pts	Tuovi Vahtera (FIN)	4124 pts
4 × 100 m relay	Denmark (DEN)	47.4 CR	Sweden (SWE)	47.7	Finland (FIN)	47.9

== Points table ==
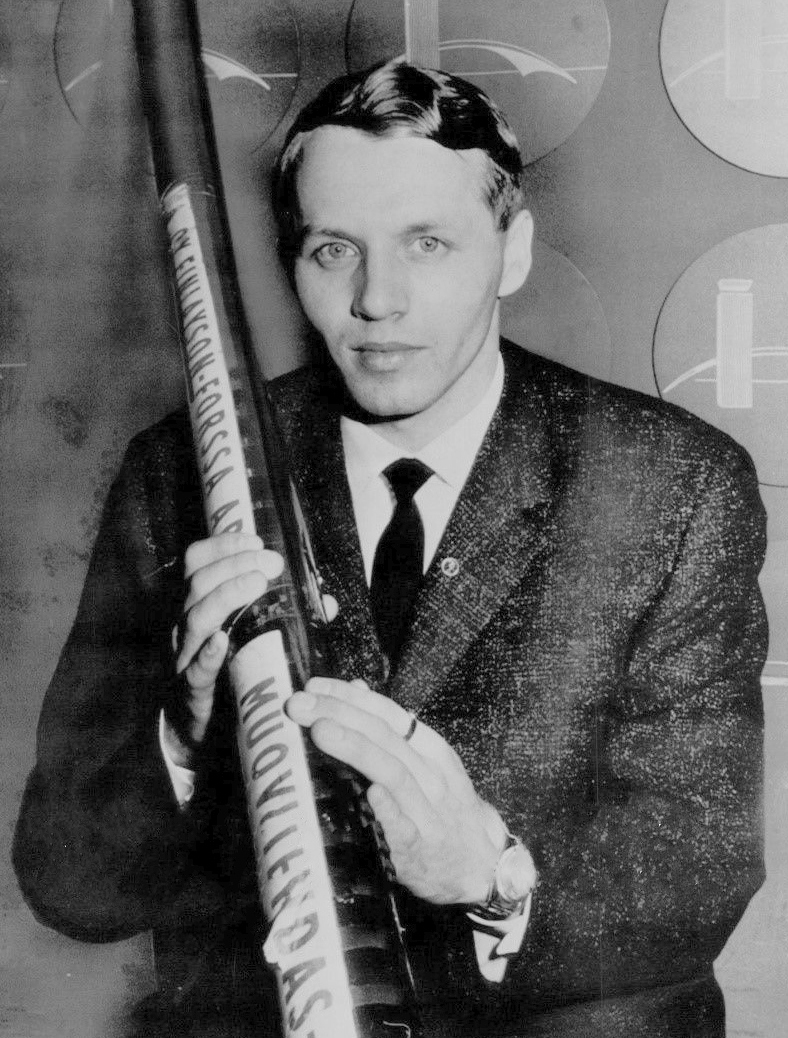
World record-breaking pole vaulter Pentti Nikula helped Finland to a second men's title

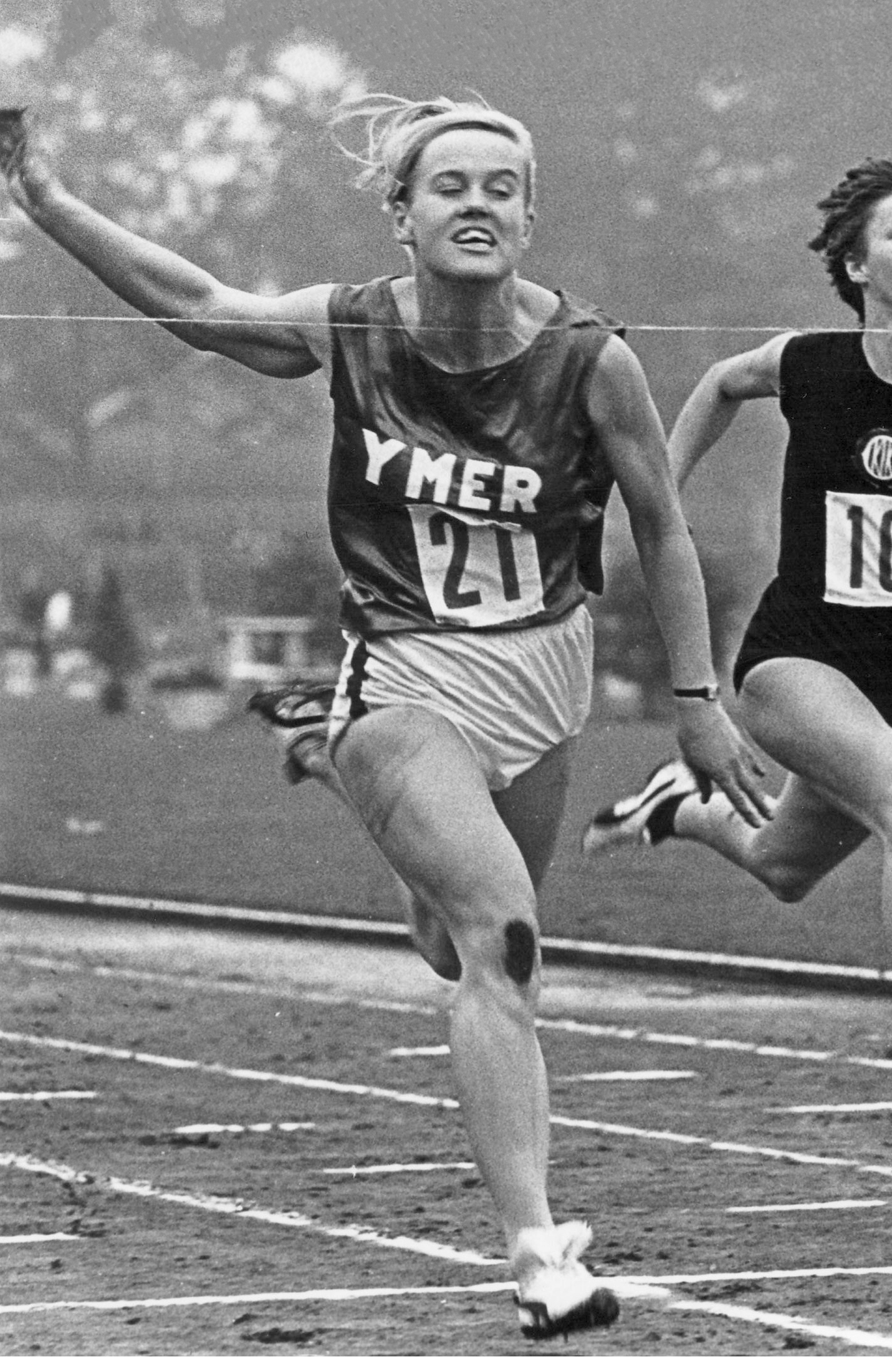
Ulla-Britt Wieslander defended her 100 m and 200 m titles to lead the Swedish women to a second team title

=== Men ===
Rank	Country	Points
1	Finland	225.5
2	Sweden	131
3	Norway	87.5
4	Denmark	19
5	Iceland	8

=== Women ===
Rank	Country	Points
1	Sweden	104
2	Finland	84
3	Denmark	53
4	Norway	17
