= 1961 Nordic Athletics Championships =

- Host city: Oslo, Norway
- Level: Senior
- Type: Outdoor

The 1961 Nordic Athletics Championships was the inaugural edition of the international athletics competition between Nordic countries and was held in Oslo, Norway. It consisted of 34 individual athletics events, 22 for men and 12 for women. This covered a track and field programme plus a men's marathon race.

Finland topped the men's points classification with 190.5 points, while Sweden won the first women's team title with 89 points. Iceland took part in the men's competition only and was the only nation not to have an athlete top the podium. Among the athletes in attendance were 1956 Olympic medalists Vilhjálmur Einarsson and Jorma Valkama and 1960 Olympic medalist Eeles Landström.

Nina Hansen was the most successful athlete of the tournament, taking the women's titles in 80 metres hurdles, long jump and women's pentathlon for Denmark. Carl Fredrik Bunæs and Ulla-Britt Wieslander won 100 metres/200 metres sprint doubles in the men's and women's sections, respectively. Dan Waern of Sweden had a middle-distance track double and Finland's Reijo Höykinpuro similarly completed a long-distance track double.

== Medal summary ==
=== Men ===
Event	Gold		Silver		Bronze	
100 metres	Carl Fredrik Bunæs (NOR)	10.5	Owe Jonsson (SWE)	10.6	Sven Hörtevall (SWE)	10.7
200 metres	Carl Fredrik Bunæs (NOR)	21.2	Owe Jonsson (SWE)	21.6	Börje Strand (FIN)	21.6
400 metres	Alf Petersson (SWE)	47.1	Jussi Rintamäki (FIN)	47.6	Hans-Olof Johansson (SWE)	47.7
800 metres	Dan Waern (SWE)	1:48.9	Olavi Salonen (FIN)	1:49.7	Jan Henrik Bentzon (NOR)	1:49.9
1500 metres	Dan Waern (SWE)	3:44.8	Sten Jonsson (SWE)	3:45.9	Olavi Salonen (FIN)	3:46.0
5000 metres	Reijo Höykinpuro (FIN)	14:12.4	Simo Saloranta (FIN)	14:15.8	Niels Nielsen (DEN)	14:16.0
10,000 metres	Reijo Höykinpuro (FIN)	30:03.2	Niels Nielsen (DEN)	30:03.8	Ola Tellesbø (NOR)	30:03.8
Marathon	Tenho Salakka (FIN)	2:26:14	Evert Nyberg (SWE)	2:26:37	Arnold Vaide (SWE)	2:26:40
3000 metres steeplechase	Lage Tedenby (SWE)	8:51.0	Gunnar Tjörnebo (SWE)	8:52.0	Esko Sirén (FIN)	8:52.4
110 m hurdles	Bo Forssander (SWE)	14.4	Raimo Koivu (FIN)	14.8	Jan Gulbrandsen (NOR)	14.9
400 m hurdles	Jussi Rintamäki (FIN)	51.1	Hannu Ehoniemi (FIN)	52.0	Jan Gulbrandsen (NOR)	52.1
High jump	Stig Pettersson (SWE)	2.11 m	Richard Dahl (SWE)	2.01 m	Jón Thordur Ólafsson (ISL)	2.01 m
Pole vault	Eeles Landström (FIN)	4.50 m	Risto Ankio (FIN)	4.50 m	Kjell Hovik (NOR) Per-Olof Jonasson (FIN)	4.45 m
Long jump	Jorma Valkama (FIN)	7.45 m	Aarre Asiala (FIN)	7.31 m	Juhani Manninen (FIN)	7.30 m
Triple jump	Kari Rahkamo (FIN)	15.47 m	Vilhjálmur Einarsson (ISL)	15.34 m	Odd Bergh (NOR)	15.27 m
Shot put	Erik Uddebom (SWE)	16.96 m	Jarmo Kunnas (FIN)	16.90 m	Alpo Nisula (FIN)	16.49 m
Discus throw	Stein Haugen (NOR)	54.09 m	Paavo Lammi (FIN)	53.06 m	Erik Uddebom (SWE)	52.87 m
Hammer throw	Birger Asplund (SWE)	62.98 m	Kalevi Horppu (FIN)	62.23 m	Magne Føleide (NOR)	59.61 m
Javelin throw	Willy Rasmussen (NOR)	79.16 m	Väinö Kuisma (FIN)	78.38 m	Pauli Nevala (FIN)	77.57 m
Decathlon	Seppo Suutari (FIN)	7178 pts	Markus Kahma (FIN)	6843 pts	Björgvin Hólm (ISL)	6229 pts
4 × 100 m relay	Sweden (SWE)	41.2	Finland (FIN)	41.5	Denmark (DEN)	41.8
4 × 400 m relay	Sweden (SWE)	3:10.6	Norway (NOR)	3:13.8	Finland (FIN)	3:13.8

=== Women ===
Event	Gold		Silver		Bronze	
100 metres	Ulla-Britt Wieslander (SWE)	12.4	Solgunn Bovall (SWE)	12.5	Lone Hadrup (DEN)	12.5
200 metres	Ulla-Britt Wieslander (SWE)	25.1	Solgunn Bovall (SWE)	25.1	Lone Hadrup (DEN)	25.7
400 metres	Elisabeth Östberg (SWE)	56.6	Ann-Marie Tegelius (SWE)	57.8	Aulikki Jaakkola (FIN)	58.8
800 metres	Ellen Jørgensen (DEN)	2:17.3	Ylva Lindberg (SWE)	2:18.2	Saara Vilén (FIN)	2:18.5
80 m hurdles	Nina Hansen (DEN)	11.5	Sirkka Norrlund (FIN)	11.5	Gunilla Cederström (SWE)	11.7
High jump	Mette Oxvang (DEN)	1.64 m	Leena Kaarna (FIN)	1.61 m	Riitta-Maija Soppi (FIN)	1.61 m
Long jump	Nina Hansen (DEN)	5.82 m	Oddrun Lange (NOR)	5.70 m	Brita Johansson (FIN)	5.65 m
Shot put	Karen Inge Halkier (DEN)	14.00 m	Maj-Britt Stolpe (SWE)	13.06 m	Vieno Väliahde (FIN)	12.91 m
Discus throw	Inkeri Talvitie (FIN)	45.40 m	Karen Inge Halkier (DEN)	42.76 m	Edel Leverås (NOR)	42.29 m
Javelin throw	Ingrid Almqvist (SWE)	50.85 m	Raija Talvensaari (FIN)	47.13 m	Sirpa Toivola (FIN)	47.04 m
Pentathlon	Nina Hansen (DEN)	4367 pts	Gunilla Cederström (SWE)	4353 pts	Tuovi Vahtera (FIN)	4127 pts
4 × 100 m relay	Sweden (SWE)	48.2	Denmark (DEN)	48.5	Finland (FIN)	48.7

== Points table ==
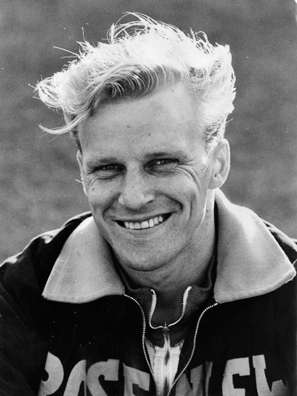
Eeles Landström win in the pole vault helped the Finnish men to the team title

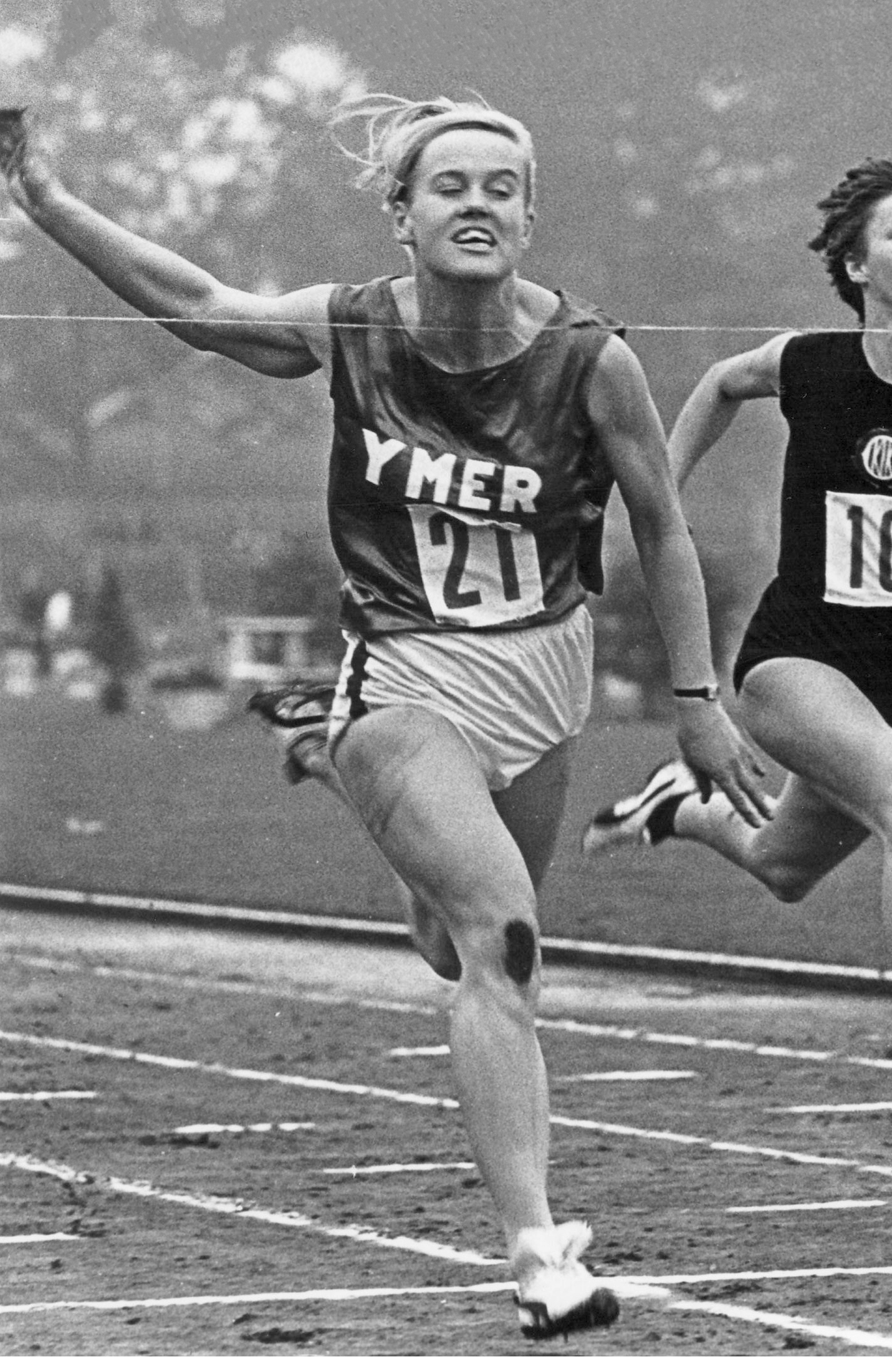
Ulla-Britt Wieslander, winner of both 100 m and 200 m races, was part of the winning Swedish women's team

=== Men ===
Rank	Country	Points
1	Finland	190.5
2	Sweden	157
3	Norway	89.5
4	Denmark	21
5	Iceland	17

=== Women ===
Rank	Country	Points
1	Sweden	89
2	Denmark	68
3	Finland	56
4	Norway	40
