= Athletics at the 1967 Summer Universiade – Men's 5000 metres =

The men's 5000 metres event at the 1967 Summer Universiade was held at the National Olympic Stadium in Tokyo on 4 September 1967.

== Results ==
Rank	Name	Nationality	Time	Notes
1st place, gold medalist(s)	Keisuke Sawaki	Japan	14:03.8	
2nd place, silver medalist(s)	Van Nelson	United States	14:05.4	
3rd place, bronze medalist(s)	John Jackson	Great Britain	14:06.6	
4	Jouko Kuha	Finland	14:20.0	
5	Ken-ichi Otsuki	Japan	14:21.2	
6	Fergus Murray	Great Britain	14:21.6	
7	Dave Bailey	Canada	14:25.8	
8	Gioacchino de Palma	Italy	14:28.8	
9	Lutz Philipp	West Germany	14:35.4	
10	François Lacour	France	14:54.0	
11	Giuseppe Cindolo	Italy	14:55.0	
12	Laurie Toogood	Australia	15:01.2	
