= 1965 Nordic Athletics Championships =

- Host city: Helsinki, Finland
- Level: Senior
- Type: Outdoor
- Events: 34
- Records set: 20 championship records

The 1965 Nordic Athletics Championships was the third and final edition of the international athletics competition between Nordic countries and was held in Helsinki, Finland. It consisted of 34 individual athletics events, 22 for men and 12 for women. This covered a track and field programme plus a men's marathon race.

Finland won its third team title in the men's points classification with 161 points and dethroned Sweden in the women's team competition with a total of 77 points. Iceland took part in the men's competition only and had its first and only champion at this edition – Valbjörn Thorláksson in the decathlon. Among the athletes in attendance were 1962 European Athletics Championships medalists Stig Pettersson, Rainer Stenius and Pentti Eskola.

Berit Berthelsen of Norway was the athlete of the tournament, taking a sweep of the women's sprints from 100 metres to 400 metres as well as the long jump. Finland's Marjatta Mäkinen won the shot put and discus throw events. No man won an individual double at this edition. Nina Hansen won the women's pentathlon, making her the only athlete in the competition's history to win three straight titles in an event. Carl Fredrik Bunæs (twice 100 m champion) returned to win a third title, this time in 400 m. Athletes to defend their 1963 titles included Bengt Persson (steeplechase) and Bjørn Bang Andersen (shot put).

== Medal summary ==
=== Men ===
| Event | Gold | | Silver | | Bronze | |
|---|---|---|---|---|---|---|
| 100 metres | Ole Bernt Skarstein (NOR) | 10.6 | Aarno Musku (FIN) | 10.7 | Jorma Ehrström (FIN) | 10.8 |
| 200 metres | Aarno Musku (FIN) | 21.6 | Ole Bernt Skarstein (NOR) | 21.7 | Bo Althoff (SWE) | 21.9 |
| 400 metres | Carl Fredrik Bunæs (NOR) | 47.2 | Bengt-Göran Fernström (SWE) | 48.0 | Heikki Pippola (FIN) | 48.1 |
| 800 metres | Juha Väätäinen (FIN) | 1:50.7 | Anders Gärderud (SWE) | 1:50.8 | Keijo Ceder (FIN) | 1:50.9 |
| 1500 metres | Karl-Uno Olofsson (SWE) | 3:46.4 | Stig Rekdal (NOR) | 3:46.6 | Keijo Ceder (FIN) | 3:47.1 |
| 5000 metres | Bengt Nåjde (SWE) | 14:05.0 CR | Gunnar Larsson (SWE) | 14:14.8 | Odd Fuglem (NOR) | 14:19.0 |
| 10,000 metres | Gunnar Larsson (SWE) | 30:18.4 | Bjarne Sletten (NOR) | 30:36.4 | Erkki Rantala (FIN) | 30:42.0 |
| Marathon | Tenho Salakka (FIN) | 2:24:51 | Per Gunnar Lien (NOR) | 2:24:51 | Paavo Pystynen (FIN) | 2:26:56 |
| 3000 metres steeplechase | Bengt Persson (SWE) | 8:40.0 CR | Esko Sirén (FIN) | 8:40.6 | Jouko Kuha (FIN) | 8:41.0 |
| 110 m hurdles | Bo Forssander (SWE) | 14.0 CR | Ove Andersson (SWE) | 14.8 | Sture Fröberg (SWE) | 14.8 |
| 400 m hurdles | Bertil Vistam (SWE) | 52.0 | Jan Gulbrandsen (NOR) | 52.5 | Lennart Bring (SWE) | 52.6 |
| High jump | Kjell-Åke Nilsson (SWE) | 2.08 m | Pertti Lantti (FIN) | 2.08 m | Stig Pettersson (SWE) | 2.08 m |
| Pole vault | Aulis Kairento (FIN) | 4.85 m CR | Tapio Mertanen (SWE) | 4.80 m | Hans Lagerqvist (SWE) | 4.75 m |
| Long jump | Rainer Stenius (FIN) | 7.89 m CR | Pentti Eskola (FIN) | 7.77 m | Juhani Manninen (FIN) | 7.65 m |
| Triple jump | Pertti Pousi (FIN) | 15.61 m CR | Kjell Arthur Paulsen (NOR) | 15.50 m | Jorma Gröhn (FIN) | 15.41 m |
| Shot put | Bjørn Bang Andersen (NOR) | 17.80 m CR | Matti Yrjölä (FIN) | 17.43 m | Harald Lorentzen (NOR) | 17.30 m |
| Discus throw | Lars Haglund (SWE) | 57.68 m CR | Pentti Repo (FIN) | 55.24 m | Niilo Hangasvaara (FIN) | 54.78 m |
| Hammer throw | Oddvar Krogh (NOR) | 64.30 m CR | Birger Asplund (SWE) | 63.46 m | Reino Suuripää (FIN) | 60.46 m |
| Javelin throw | Jorma Kinnunen (FIN) | 82.90 m CR | Willy Rasmussen (NOR) | 80.72 m | Väinö Kuisma (FIN) | 76.40 m |
| Decathlon | Valbjörn Thorláksson (ISL) | 6902 pts | Tore Carbe (SWE) | 6801 pts | Stig Nymander (FIN) | 6782 pts |
| 4 × 100 m relay | Finland (FIN) | 40.3 CR | Sweden (SWE) | 41.5 | Norway (NOR) | 41.6 |
| 4 × 400 m relay | Sweden (SWE) | 3:10.3 CR | Norway (NOR) | 3:10.3 | Only 2 teams finished | |

=== Women ===
| Event | Gold | | Silver | | Bronze | |
|---|---|---|---|---|---|---|
| 100 metres | Berit Berthelsen (NOR) | 12.0 | Karin Wallgren (SWE) | 12.0 | Lone Hadrup (DEN) | 12.2 |
| 200 metres | Berit Berthelsen (NOR) | 24.4 | Karin Wallgren (SWE) | 24.6 | Else Hadrup (DEN) | 25.1 |
| 400 metres | Berit Berthelsen (NOR) | 54.4 CR | Elisabeth Östberg (SWE) | 55.6 | Tove Bakkejord (NOR) | 55.8 |
| 800 metres | Jette Andersen (DEN) | 2:12.0 CR | Gunilla Olausson (SWE) | 2:13.0 | Elisabeth Östberg (SWE) | 2:14.0 |
| 80 m hurdles | Sirkka Norrlund (FIN) | 10.9 CR | Nina Hansen (DEN) | 11.3 | Lena Kindberg (SWE) | 11.5 |
| High jump | Agneta Falkengren (SWE) | 1.64 m CR= | Monica Lidholt (SWE) | 1.64 m | Margareta Bergqvist (SWE) | 1.64 m |
| Long jump | Berit Berthelsen (NOR) | 6.37 m CR | Oddrun Hokland (NOR) | 6.08 m | Maija Koivusaari (FIN) | 5.90 m |
| Shot put | Marjatta Mäkinen (FIN) | 15.66 m CR | Karen Inge Halkier (DEN) | 14.23 m | Gun-Britt Flink (SWE) | 14.00 m |
| Discus throw | Marjatta Mäkinen (FIN) | 51.70 m CR | Sirkka Kauppinen (FIN) | 44.90 m | Inkeri Lehtonen (FIN) | 44.70 m |
| Javelin throw | Ellen Kortsen (DEN) | 47.72 m | Raija Mustonen (FIN) | 45.14 m | Gun-Britt Liljergren (SWE) | 44.74 m |
| Pentathlon | Nina Hansen (DEN) | 4477 pts | Oddrun Hokland (NOR) | 4475 pts | Pirkko Heikkilä (FIN) | 4311 pts |
| 4 × 100 m relay | Norway (NOR) | 47.0 CR | Sweden (SWE) | 47.5 | Finland (FIN) | 47.8 |

== Points table ==
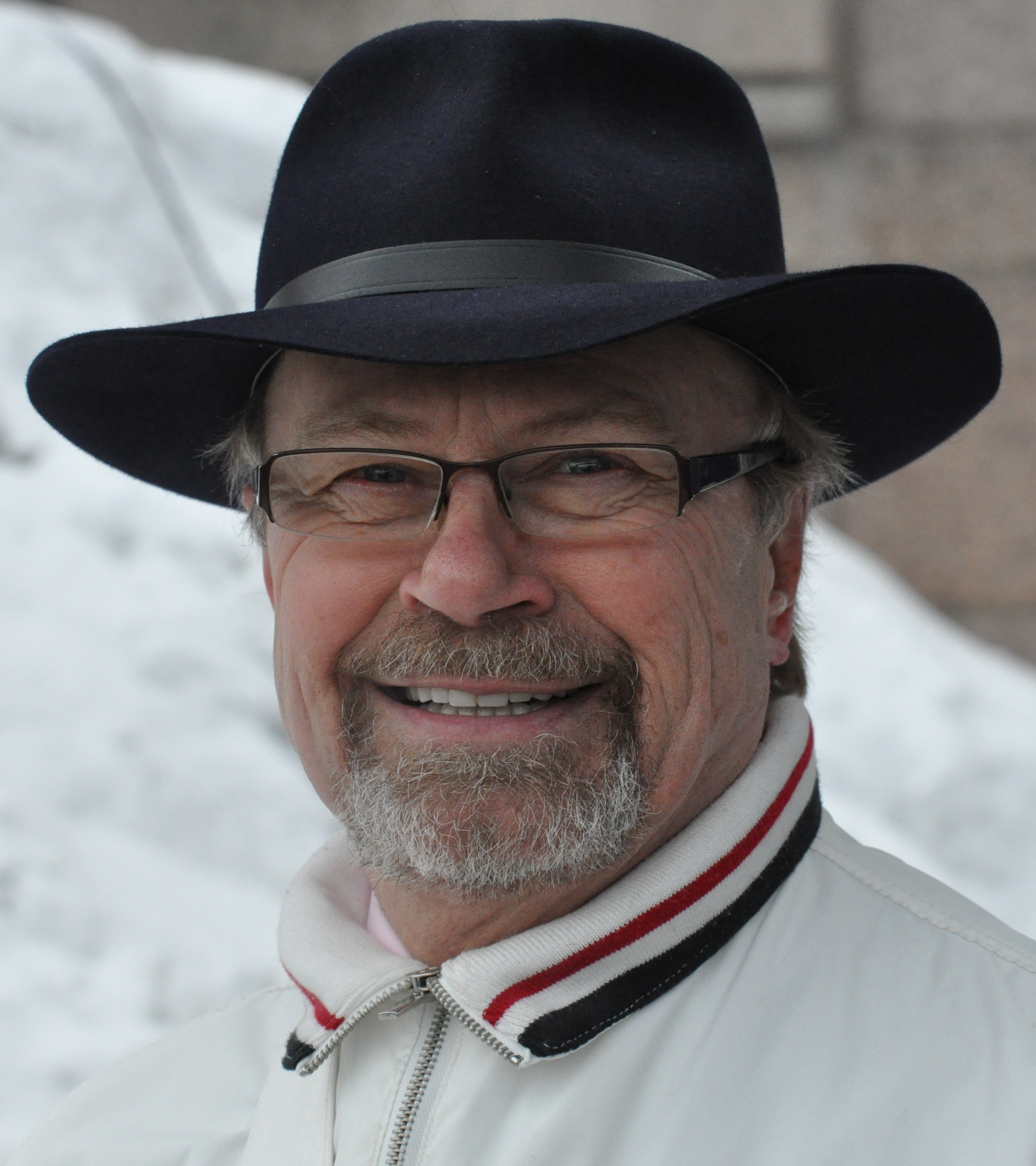
Future European champion Juha Väätäinen won the 800 m to help Finland to a third men's title

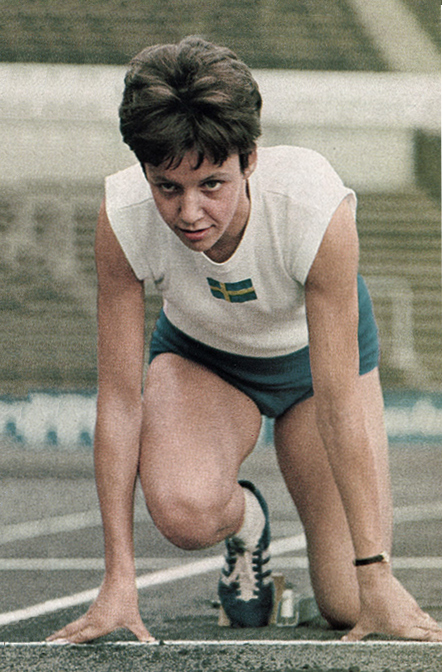
Karin Wallgren of Sweden was runner-up in the short sprints and in the women's competition with Sweden

=== Men ===
| Rank | Country | Points |
|---|---|---|
| 1 | Finland | 161 |
| 2 | Sweden | 147 |
| 3 | Norway | 106 |
| 4 | Iceland | 10 |
| 5 | Denmark | 9 |

=== Women ===
| Rank | Country | Points |
|---|---|---|
| 1 | Finland | 77 |
| 2 | Sweden | 69 |
| 3 | Norway | 54 |
| 4 | Denmark | 47 |
