= Athletics at the 1965 Summer Universiade – Men's 5000 metres =

The men's 5000 metres event at the 1965 Summer Universiade was held at the People's Stadium in Budapest on 25 and 27 August 1965.

== Medalists ==
Gold	Silver	Bronze
Keisuke Sawaki; Japan	Lutz Philipp; West Germany	Fergus Murray; Great Britain

== Results ==
=== Heats ===
Rank	Heat	Athlete	Nationality	Time	Notes
1	1	Keisuke Sawaki	Japan	14:07.0	Q, UR
2	1	Fergus Murray	Great Britain	14:13.2	Q
3	1	Kęstutis Orentas	Soviet Union	14:13.2	Q
4	1	József Mácsár	Hungary	14:21.2	Q
5	1	François Lacour	France	14:24.2	Q
6	1	Bob Schul	United States	14:25.0	Q
7	1	Ralph Hesse	West Germany	14:25.4	
8	1	Vladimír Balšánek	Czechoslovakia	14:31.0	
9	1	Umberto Risi	Italy	14:44.4	
10	1	Marian Bukowiec	Poland	15:06.2	
1	2	Tim Johnston	Great Britain	14:44.2	Q
2	2	Lutz Philipp	West Germany	14:44.2	Q
3	2	Denes Simon	Hungary	14:44.2	Q
4	2	Lage Tedenby	Sweden	14:52.0	Q
5	2	Charles Galharague	France	14:52.6	Q
6	2	Georgi Chulev	Bulgaria	14:54.0	Q
7	2	Paweł Kiczyłło	Poland	14:54.6	
8	2	Gioacchino De Palma	Italy	15:19.2	

=== Final ===
Rank	Name	Nationality	Time	Notes
1st place, gold medalist(s)	Keisuke Sawaki	Japan	13:45.2	UR, NR
2nd place, silver medalist(s)	Lutz Philipp	West Germany	13:46.6	
3rd place, bronze medalist(s)	Fergus Murray	Great Britain	13:52.6	
4	Kęstutis Orentas	Soviet Union	13:55.6	
5	Tim Johnston	Great Britain	14:11.8	
6	François Lacour	France	14:14.4	
6	Denes Simon	Hungary	14:14.4	
8	József Mácsár	Hungary	14:23.6	
9	Georgi Chulev	Bulgaria	14:23.6	
10	Charles Galharague	France	14:45.2	
11	Lage Tedenby	Sweden	15:01.6	
	Bob Schul	United States	DNS	
