= Athletics at the 1967 Summer Universiade – Men's 10,000 metres =

The men's 10,000 metres event at the 1967 Summer Universiade was held at the National Olympic Stadium in Tokyo on 30 August 1967. It was the first time that this event was contested at the Universiade.

== Results ==
Rank	Name	Nationality	Time	Notes
1st place, gold medalist(s)	Keisuke Sawaki	Japan	29:00.0	
2nd place, silver medalist(s)	Van Nelson	United States	29:00.6	
3rd place, bronze medalist(s)	Lutz Philipp	West Germany	29:21.4	
4	Tsugumichi Suzuki	Japan	29:45.8	
5	Mike Turner	Great Britain	29:52.6	
6	Gioacchino De Palma	Italy	30:13.2	
7	Fergus Murray	Great Britain	30:41.6	
8	François Lacour	France	31:09.4	
9	Barry Jones	New Zealand	31:12.4	
10	Park Bong-kuen	South Korea	31:57.2	
	Ralph Hesse	West Germany	DNF	
