= Athletics at the 1967 Summer Universiade – Men's 3000 metres steeplechase =

The men's 3000 metres steeplechase event at the 1967 Summer Universiade was held at the National Olympic Stadium in Tokyo on 4 September 1967. It was the first time that the event was held at the Universiade.

== Results ==
Rank	Name	Nationality	Time	Notes
1st place, gold medalist(s)	Jouko Kuha	Finland	8:38.2	
2nd place, silver medalist(s)	John Jackson	Great Britain	8:42.8	
3rd place, bronze medalist(s)	Nobuyoshi Matsuda	Japan	8:52.2	
4	Katsushi Isobata	Japan	8:57.4	
5	Tony Ashton	Great Britain	8:59.6	
6	Ralph Hesse	West Germany	9:05.4	
	Lutz Philipp	West Germany	DNF	
