= 1966 European Athletics Championships – Men's 3000 metres steeplechase =

Men's 3000 metres steeplechase at the European Athletics Championships

The men's 3000 metres steeplechase at the 1966 European Athletics Championships was held in Budapest, Hungary, at Népstadion on 1 and 3 September 1966.

== Medalists ==
Gold	Viktor Kudinskiy; Soviet Union
Silver	Anatoliy Kuryan; Soviet Union
Bronze	Gaston Roelants; Belgium

== Results ==
=== Final ===
3 September

Rank	Name	Nationality	Time	Notes
1st place, gold medalist(s)	Viktor Kudinskiy	Soviet Union	8:26.6	CR NR
2nd place, silver medalist(s)	Anatoliy Kuryan	Soviet Union	8:28.0	
3rd place, bronze medalist(s)	Gaston Roelants	Belgium	8:28.8	
4	Guy Texereau	France	8:30.0	NR
5	Manfred Letzerich	West Germany	8:31.0	NR
6	Dieter Hartmann	East Germany	8:31.6	NR
7	Zoltan Vamoș	Romania	8:34.0	NR
8	Maurice Herriott	Great Britain	8:37.0	
9	Bengt Persson	Sweden	8:38.0	
10	Javier Álvarez	Spain	8:40.0	
11	Aleksandr Morozov	Soviet Union	8:40.6	
12	Ernie Pomfret	Great Britain	8:40.6	

=== Heats ===
1 September

==== Heat 1 ====
Rank	Name	Nationality	Time	Notes
1	Gaston Roelants	Belgium	8:33.8	Q
2	Aleksandr Morozov	Soviet Union	8:34.0	Q
3	Zoltan Vamoș	Romania	8:34.6	NR Q
4	Bengt Persson	Sweden	8:35.4	Q
5	Jouko Kuha	Finland	8:36.2	NR
6	Manuel de Oliveira	Portugal	8:44.0	
7	Hans-Werner Wogatzky	West Germany	8:49.4	
8	Sandor Mate	Hungary	9:03.2	
9	Lachie Stewart	Great Britain	9:10.2	

==== Heat 2 ====
Rank	Name	Nationality	Time	Notes
1	Manfred Letzerich	West Germany	8:45.2	Q
2	Dieter Hartmann	East Germany	8:45.4	Q
3	Ernie Pomfret	Great Britain	8:46.8	Q
4	Viktor Kudinskiy	Soviet Union	8:48.2	Q
5	Jan-Erik Karlsson	Sweden	8:52.8	
6	Jerzy Czaplewski	Poland	8:59.8	
7	Petr Holas	Czechoslovakia	9:06.8	
	István Jóny	Hungary	DNF	

==== Heat 3 ====
Rank	Name	Nationality	Time	Notes
1	Javier Álvarez	Spain	8:47.4	Q
2	Guy Texereau	France	8:47.8	Q
3	Maurice Herriott	Great Britain	8:48.2	Q
4	Anatoliy Kuryan	Soviet Union	8:49.6	Q
5	Edward Motyl	Poland	8:52.0	
6	Mikhail Zhelev	Bulgaria	8:52.0	
7	Karoly Magyar	Hungary	8:54.4	
8	Hartmut Neumann	West Germany	8:57.8	

== Participation ==
According to an unofficial count, 25 athletes from 15 countries participated in the event.

- Belgium (1)
- Bulgaria (1)
- Czechoslovakia (1)
- East Germany (1)
- Finland (1)
- France (1)
- Hungary (3)
- Poland (2)
- Portugal (1)
- Romania (1)
- Soviet Union (3)
- Spain (1)
- Sweden (2)
- Great Britain (3)
- West Germany (3)
