= Athletics at the 1968 Summer Olympics – Men's 3000 metres steeplechase =

Men's 3000 metres steeplechase at the Games of the XIX Olympiad
- Venue: Estadio Olímpico Universitario
- Dates: October 14, 1968 (heats); October 16, 1968 (final)
- Competitors: 40 from 22 nations
- Winning time: 8:51.02

Medalists
1st place, gold medalist(s)		Amos Biwott; Kenya
2nd place, silver medalist(s)		Benjamin Kogo; Kenya
3rd place, bronze medalist(s)		George Young; United States

Video on YouTube @ 7:10 Official Video

The men's 3000 metres steeplechase was the only steeplechase on the Athletics at the 1968 Summer Olympics program in Mexico City. It was held on 14 October and 16 October 1968.

Four years earlier, Benjamin Kogo was the only Kenyan in the field, not making it out of the qualifying round. On the final lap, Kogo was in third place and his teammate was back in fifth behind Soviet Aleksandr Morozov with 200 metres to go. George Young had a few metres lead on Kerry O'Brien. In the 50 metres going into the water jump, Kogo passed O'Brien and pulled even with Young. Kogo took that water jump so much faster than Young, he gained a foot and had the momentum to carry him several metres into the lead. Young was straining to hold off O'Brien over the final barrier. O'Brien even checked over his left shoulder to make sure Morozov was not coming. Simultaneously Biwott was about to pass him on right. Biwott took the hurdle awkwardly, almost landing on both feet. But Biwott had more speed, leaving O'Brien and Young and then sprinting past Kogo on to a three-metre victory.

Since this 1–2 victory, Kenya has gone on to dominate the event in the Olympics. Except for the two boycott years of 1976 and 1980, Kenya has won more than 2/3 of all medals offered, usually going 1-2 and sweeping the event twice.

== Results ==
=== Round One ===
The first rounds were held on October 14. The fastest four athletes in each of the three heats advanced to the Final Round.

Heat One

Rank	Name	Nationality	Time	Notes
1	Benjamin Kogo	Kenya	8:57.80Q	
2	Javier Álvarez	Spain	9:03.74Q	
3	Bengt Persson	Sweden	9:06.43Q	
4	Arne Risa	Norway	9:07.31Q	
5	John Jackson	Great Britain	9:11.33	
6	Conrad Nightingale	United States	9:13.23	
7	Tadesse Wolde-Medhin	Ethiopia	9:13.24	
8	Manuel de Oliveira	Portugal	9:19.22	
9	Klaus-Ludwig Brosius	West Germany	9:23.98	
10	János Szabó	Hungary	9:25.82	
11	Pedro Miranda	Mexico	9:25.95	
12	Domingo Amaizón	Argentina	9:43.06	
	Larbi Oukada	Morocco	DNF	

Heat Two

Rank	Name	Nationality	Time	Notes
1	Jean-Paul Villain	France	9:01.12Q	
2	George Young	United States	9:01.49Q	
3	Kerry O'Brien	Australia	9:02.31Q	
4	Viktor Kudinskiy	Soviet Union	9:05.25Q	
5	Willi Wagner	West Germany	9:24.49	
6	Labidi Ayachi	Tunisia	9:24.62	
7	Nobuyoshi Miura	Japan	9:32.95	
8	Maurice Herriott	Great Britain	9:34.68	
9	Albertino Etchechury	Uruguay	9:35.61	
10	Eddy Van Butsele	Belgium	9:38.79	
11	Jan Cych	Poland	9:50.78	
12	Hans Menet	Switzerland	10:02.06	
13	Efraín Cordero	El Salvador	11:19.23	
AC	Mariano Haro	Spain	[9:15.93]DQ	

Heat Three

Rank	Name	Nationality	Time	Notes
1	Amos Biwott	Kenya	8:49.39Q	
2	Mikhail Zhelev	Bulgaria	9:01.96Q	
3	Gaston Roelants	Belgium	9:08.29Q	
4	Aleksandr Morozov	Soviet Union	9:08.45Q	
5	Bill Reilly	United States	9:10.35	
6	Peter Welsh	New Zealand	9:13.80	
7	Gareth Bryan-Jones	Great Britain	9:16.86	
8	Jan-Erik Karlsson	Sweden	9:19.64	
9	Taketsugu Saruwatari	Japan	9:26.30	
10	Heinz-Gerd Mölders	West Germany	9:32.22	
11	Umberto Risi	Italy	9:43.97	
12	Julio Quevedo	Guatemala	9:48.37	
AC	Guy Texereau	France	DNF	

=== Final ===
The final was held on October 16. Biwott amazed the crowd leaping over the water jump using long jump-type technique, completely clearing the water. His barrier technique was also unique and he jumped with both feet together rather than in a hurdling technique. Benjamin Kogo led the final thru the kilometer but at the bell George Young joined him. Young took the lead with 300 to go, but Biwott ran down everybody in the final straight to win the gold medal. This began the Kenyan dominance of the steeplechase event.

Rank	Name	Nationality	Time	Notes
1st place, gold medalist(s)	Amos Biwott	Kenya	8:51.02	
2nd place, silver medalist(s)	Benjamin Kogo	Kenya	8:51.56	
3rd place, bronze medalist(s)	George Young	United States	8:51.86	
4	Kerry O'Brien	Australia	8:52.08	
5	Aleksandr Morozov	Soviet Union	8:55.61	
6	Mikhail Zhelev	Bulgaria	8:58.41	
7	Gaston Roelants	Belgium	8:59.50	
8	Arne Risa	Norway	9:08.98	
9	Jean-Paul Villain	France	9:16.27	
10	Bengt Persson	Sweden	9:20.61	
11	Javier Álvarez	Spain	9:24.51	
	Viktor Kudinskiy	Soviet Union	DNF	
