= Athletics at the 1967 Summer Universiade – Men's shot put =

The men's shot put event at the 1967 Summer Universiade was held at the National Olympic Stadium in Tokyo on 4 September 1967.

== Results ==
Rank	Name	Nationality	Result	Notes
1st place, gold medalist(s)	Neal Steinhauer	United States	19.19	
2nd place, silver medalist(s)	Traugott Glöckler	Germany	18.59	
3rd place, bronze medalist(s)	Antero Juntto	Finland	17.24	
4	Hein-Direck Neu	West Germany	16.98	
5	Yoshihisa Ishida	Japan	16.69	
6	Masazumi Aoki	Japan	16.39	
7	Jacques Le Fevre	France	15.77	
