= Athletics at the 1967 Summer Universiade – Women's 400 metres =

The women's 400 metres event at the 1967 Summer Universiade was held at the National Olympic Stadium in Tokyo on 1 September 1967. It was the first time that this distance was contested by women at the Universiade.

== Results ==
Rank	Name	Nationality	Time	Notes
1st place, gold medalist(s)	Elisabeth Östberg	Sweden	55.4	
2nd place, silver medalist(s)	Gabriele Grossekettler	West Germany	56.0	
3rd place, bronze medalist(s)	Biruta Vilmanis	Australia	56.5	
4	Pat Brown	Great Britain	57.8	
5	Gerlinde Hefner	West Germany	57.9	
6	Yasuo Mishima	Japan	58.3	
7	Jane Perry	Great Britain	58.8	
8	Yoko Miyamoto	Japan	59.0	
