= Athletics at the 1967 Summer Universiade – Women's 800 metres =

The women's 800 metres event at the 1967 Summer Universiade was held at the National Olympic Stadium in Tokyo on 3 and 4 September 1967.

== Medalists ==
Gold	Silver	Bronze
Madeline Manning; United States	Abby Hoffman; Canada	Elisabeth Östberg; Sweden

== Results ==
=== Heats ===
Rank	Heat	Athlete	Nationality	Time	Notes
1	1	Madeline Manning	United States	2:13.4	Q
2	1	Gerlinde Hefner	West Germany	2:13.5	Q
3	1	Jane Perry	Great Britain	2:14.6	Q
4	1	Chiyoko Okamoto	Japan	2:17.1	q
5	1	Harpal Brar	India	2:18.5	q
1	2	Pat Brown	Great Britain	2:20.6	Q
2	2	Abby Hoffman	Canada	2:20.6	Q
3	2	Elisabeth Östberg	Sweden	2:21.2	Q
4	2	Yasuo Mishima	Japan	2:25.3	

=== Final ===
Rank	Name	Nationality	Time	Notes
1st place, gold medalist(s)	Madeline Manning	United States	2:06.8	
2nd place, silver medalist(s)	Abby Hoffman	Canada	2:08.5	
3rd place, bronze medalist(s)	Elisabeth Östberg	Sweden	2:08.9	
4	Gerlinde Hefner	West Germany	2:09.1	
5	Pat Brown	Great Britain	2:09.7	
6	Jane Perry	Great Britain	2:12.6	
7	Chiyoko Okamoto	Japan	2:13.3	
8	Harpal Brar	India	2:26.5	
