= RaNae Bair =

American javelin thrower (1943–2021)

Personal information
- Born: March 9, 1943 San Diego, California, United States
- Died: January 23, 2021 (aged 77) San Diego, California, United States

Sport
- Sport: Track and field
Medal record
Representing United States
Pan American Games
Silver medal – second place	1967 Winnipeg	Javelin throw
Summer Universiade
Gold medal – first place	1967 Tokyo	Javelin throw

RaNae Jean Bair (March 9, 1943 – January 23, 2021) was an American javelin thrower who represented the United States twice at the Summer Olympics: in 1964 and 1968. Born in San Diego, California, and affiliated with San Diego State University, she set her personal best (59.82 metres) in 1967. She later married UCLA distance runner (an Olympic hopeful himself) Bob Seaman, who became a USATF official and administrator.

== International competitions ==
Year	Competition	Venue	Position	Notes
Representing the United States
1964	Olympic Games	Tokyo, Japan	13th	46.89 m
1967	Pan American Games	Winnipeg, Canada	2nd	51.64 m
1967	World Student Games	Tokyo, Japan	1st	
1968	Olympic Games	Mexico City, Mexico	11th	53.14 m
