= 1968 European Indoor Games – Women's 800 metres =

The women's 800 metres event at the 1968 European Indoor Games was held on 10 March in Madrid.

== Results ==
Rank	Name	Nationality	Time	Notes
1st place, gold medalist(s)	Karin Krebs	East Germany	2:07.6	
2nd place, silver medalist(s)	Alla Kolesnikova	Soviet Union	2:08.3	
3rd place, bronze medalist(s)	Valentina Lukyanova	Soviet Union	2:09.4	
4	Emílie Ovadková	Czechoslovakia	2:09.9	
5	Ingela Ericson	Sweden	2:10.3	
6	Elisabeth Östberg	Sweden	2:20.2	
