= Shinji Ogura =

Japanese long jumper

Personal information
- Nationality: Japanese
- Born: 28 August 1944 (age 82) Yamaguchi Prefecture, Japan
- Height: 176 cm (5 ft 9 in)
- Weight: 70 kg (154 lb)

Sport
- Sport: Athletics
- Event: long jump
Medal record
Representing Japan
Asian Games
Gold medal – first place	1970 Bangkok	Long jump
Summer Universiade
Silver medal – second place	1967 Tokyo	4x100m relay

Shinji Ogura (小倉 新司, Ogura Shinji; born 28 August 1944) is a Japanese former long jumper who competed in the 1968 Summer Olympics.

Ogura finished third behind Alan Lerwill in the long jump event at the 1970 AAA Championships.
