= Tedenby =

Tedenby is a Swedish surname. Notable people with the surname include:

- Lage Tedenby (1937-2026), Swedish long-distance runner
- Mattias Tedenby (born 1990), Swedish ice hockey player
