= Neal Steinhauer =

American shot putter (1944–2020)

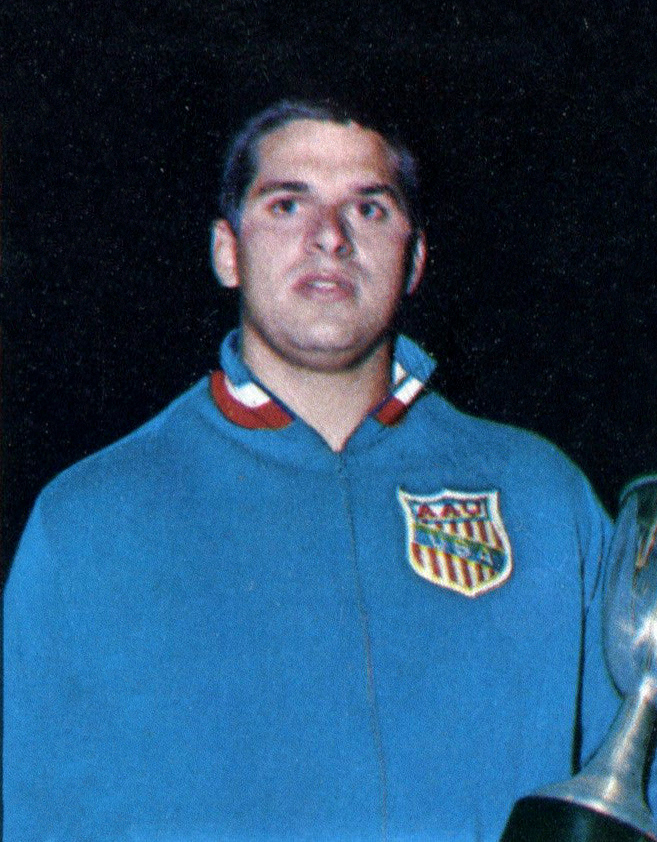
- Steinhauer c. 1968

Personal information
- Born: August 18, 1944
- Died: September 7, 2020 (aged 76) Turlock, CA

Sport
- Sport: Athletics
- Event: Shot put

Achievements and titles
- Personal best: 21.01 m (1967)
Medal record
Representing the United States
Pan American Games
Silver medal – second place	1967 Winnipeg	Shot Put
Summer Universiade
Gold medal – first place	1967 Tokyo	Shot Put
Bronze medal – third place	1967 Tokyo	Discus

Neal Steinhauer (August 18, 1944 – September 7, 2020) was an American track and field athlete. He won a silver medal in the shot put at the 1967 Pan American Games, behind Randy Matson, and also won two medals at the 1967 Summer Universiade in Tokyo (gold in the shot put and bronze in the discus). A one-time American national champion (in 1969). Steinhauer set his personal best (21.01 m) on March 25, 1967, at a meet in Sacramento. He was on the cover of the February 1969 issue of Track and Field News.
