= János Szabó (runner) =

Hungarian middle-distance runner

Personal information
- Nationality: Hungarian
- Born: 3 March 1945 Budapest, Hungary
- Died: 15 October 2017 (aged 72)

Sport
- Sport: Middle-distance running
- Event: Steeplechase

János Szabó (3 March 1945 – 15 October 2017) was a Hungarian middle-distance runner. He competed in the men's 3000 metres steeplechase at the 1968 Summer Olympics.
