= Hilde Hovdenak =

Norwegian long-distance runner

Hilde Hovdenak (born 15 February 1971) is a retired Norwegian long-distance runner who specialized in the 10,000 metres.

Internationally she finished thirteenth at the 1998 European Championships. She became Norwegian champion in the half marathon in 1998, and represented the sports clubs IL Molde-Olymp and IL i BUL.

== Personal bests ==
- 5000 metres - 16:03.89 min (1998)
- 10,000 metres - 33:11.36 min (1998)
- Half marathon - 1:14:24 hrs (1997)
- Marathon - 2:33:25 hrs (1999)
