= IL Molde-Olymp =

Norwegian sports club

- Full name: Idrettslaget Molde-Olymp
- Founded: 1929
- Ground: Molde stadion Molde Municipality

Idrettslaget Molde-Olymp is a Norwegian sports club from Molde Municipality, founded in 1971 as a merger between Molde FIL and SK Olymp. It has sections for athletics and speed skating.

As a stadium IL Molde-Olymp uses Molde idrettspark, the former home ground of football club Molde FK.

Its most prominent former member is Simon Rønsholm Sandvik, Otto Berg, winner of the silver medal in long jump at the 1934 European Championships in Athletics. Karen Fladset, Oddrun Hokland and Hilde Hovdenak represented the club (including predecessor clubs) in their early careers.
