= 1966 European Indoor Games – Women's 60 metres =

Athletics event

The women's 60 metres event at the 1966 European Indoor Games was held on 27 March in Dortmund.

== Medalists ==
Gold	Silver	Bronze
Margit Nemesházi; Hungary	Galina Mitrokhina; Soviet Union	Mary Rand; Great Britain

== Results ==
=== Heats ===
First 2 from each heat (Q) and the next 4 fastest (q) qualified for the semifinals.

Rank	Heat	Name	Nationality	Time	Notes
1	1	Ulla-Britt Wieslander	Sweden	7.5	Q
2	1	Mary Rand	Great Britain	7.5	Q
3	1	Eva Lehocká	Czechoslovakia	7.5	q
4	1	Oddrun Hokland	Norway	7.8	q
1	2	Galina Mitrokhina	Soviet Union	7.4	Q
2	2	Hannelore Trabert	West Germany	7.5	Q
3	2	Gundula Diel	East Germany	7.6	q
4	2	Therese Schueremans	Belgium	8.1	
1	3	Margit Nemesházi	Hungary	7.3	Q
2	3	Liljana Petnjarić	Yugoslavia	7.6	Q
3	3	Dorothee Sander	West Germany	7.6	q

=== Semifinals ===
First 2 from each heat (Q) and the next 2 fastest (q) qualified for the final.

Rank	Heat	Name	Nationality	Time	Notes
1	1	Margit Nemesházi	Hungary	7.2	Q, WB
2	1	Mary Rand	Great Britain	7.4	Q
3	1	Dorothee Sander	West Germany	7.4	q
4	1	Liljana Petnjarić	Yugoslavia	7.4	q
1	2	Galina Mitrokhina	Soviet Union	7.3	Q
2	2	Hannelore Trabert	West Germany	7.4	Q
3	2	Ulla-Britt Wieslander	Sweden	7.5	
4	2	Oddrun Hokland	Norway	7.7	
	1	Eva Lehocká	Czechoslovakia	DNS	
	2	Gundula Diel	East Germany	DNS	

=== Final ===
Rank	Lane	Name	Nationality	Time	Notes
1st place, gold medalist(s)	3	Margit Nemesházi	Hungary	7.3	
2nd place, silver medalist(s)	2	Galina Mitrokhina	Soviet Union	7.3	
3rd place, bronze medalist(s)	5	Mary Rand	Great Britain	7.4	
4	1	Dorothee Sander	West Germany	7.4	
5	6	Hannelore Trabert	West Germany	7.5	
6	4	Liljana Petnjarić	Yugoslavia	7.5	
