= Klaus-Ludwig Brosius =

German middle-distance runner

Personal information
- Nationality: German
- Born: 28 July 1944 (age 82)

Sport
- Sport: Middle-distance running
- Event: Steeplechase

Klaus-Ludwig Brosius (born 28 July 1944) is a German middle-distance runner. He competed in the men's 3000 metres steeplechase at the 1968 Summer Olympics.
