= Oddrun Hokland =

Norwegian pentathlete (1942–2022)

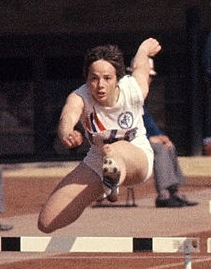
- Hokland at the 1964 Olympics

Personal information
- Born: Oddrun Lange; 29 November 1942 Nesset, Norway
- Died: 18 March 2022 (aged 79) Kvæfjord, Norway
- Height: 1.62 m (5 ft 4 in)

Sport
- Sport: Athletics
- Events: Triathlon, pentathlon; Long jump, high jump, standing long jump; Javelin throw; 80 metres hurdles; 400 metres; 4 x 100 metres relay
- Club: Vistdal IL; SK Olymp; BUL, Oslo

Achievements and titles
- Personal bests: 6.26 m (1964, LJ); 4540 (1966, pentathlon)

Oddrun Helene Hokland (née Lange; 29 November 1942 – 18 March 2022) was a Norwegian combined events athlete, agronomist and sports official. Between 1961 and 1966 she won a total of twenty-two individual national titles, with four coming in sprints and hurdles, six in jumps, three in throws and nine in combined events. She tied Norwegian records three times and set sixteen records (nine individually and seven in combined events) as well as a further three with the national relay team, totalling nineteen. She was awarded the King's Cup trophy twice, in 1961 and 1965, competed at two European Championships and one Olympic Games.

== Early career ==
She was born in Vistdal in Nesset. She represented her local club Vistdal IL before changing to SK Olymp in Molde.

She took her first medal at a Norwegian championship in 1959, winning the bronze medal in the long jump, followed by another in 1960. In 1960 she also won the national bronze medal in the triathlon—100 metres, discus throw and high jump. Her 1960 national silver medal in the javelin throw was followed by two silvers in 1962 and 1963.

== Breakthrough ==
1961 became her breakthrough year. In August 1961, Oddrun Lange set her first of many Norwegian records. In the long jump, she improved Berit Tøien's 5.79 as she achieved 5.81 metres during the Norwegian championships at Krohnsminde Stadium in Bergen. Moreover, Lange won her first King's Cup, the award given to the best athlete at the Norwegian championships, in 1961. She was the first female King's Cup winner from Møre og Romsdal. She finished second in the long jump at the 1961 Nordic Championships.

Lange also started taking over the national throne in the combined events. Having long been dominated by Jorun Tangen and before that Unni Sæther, Lange now became the Norwegian champion in the triathlon in 1961, 1962, 1964, 1965 and 1966 (plus a silver in 1963) as well as national champion in the pentathlon in 1962, 1963, 1965 and 1966.

Jorun Tangen's Norwegian record in the triathlon was first beat by Karen Fladset in 1962, who excelled in the discus throw. However, it was then beat by Oddrun Lange at Frogner Stadium in June 1963 (2305 versus 2334 points). Exactly one year later on the same stadium, Lange achieved 2483 points, improving further to 2542 points at Øverlands Minde, Stjørdalshalsen in February 1966. She lost the record in 1967, however.

The pentathlon record belonging to Tangen, of 4081 points, was improved four times by Oddrun Hokland: 4233 points in September 1963 in Tønsberg, 4429 points at the 1964 Olympics, 4475 points in August 1965 in Helsinki, and finally 4540 points in June 1966 in Frederiksberg. This record lasted until 1968 and was taken over by Berit Berthelsen (who also got the first record in 1969 after the 80 metres hurdles was replaced by the 100 metres hurdles).

Oddrun Lange Hokland and Berit Tøien Berthelsen had a fierce rivalry through the mid-1960s. It was evident from the Norwegian record in the long jump, which changed hands several times. Lange's first record of 5.81 was improved to 5.90 metres in June 1962 at Hamar Stadium, then equalled by Tøiene the next month, before Lange improved it twice the same year: first 5.97 at Bislett Stadium in August, then lastly 5.98 in September in Belgrade. After Tøien managed to equal this record too in 1963, Tøien became the first to pass the coveted 6-metre barrier, stopping at no less than 6.56 which stood for 41 years.

Lange's national long jump title in 1961 also became her only on, as Tøien Berthelsen proceeded to sweet most of the titles until 1974. Lange did take silver medals in 1963, 1964, 1965 and 1966. The two also became rivals regarding the King's Cup, with Lange Hokland taking her second one in 1965, but Tøien Berthelsen receiving it in 1963, 1964, 1966 and 1968.

In the 400 metres, Lange Hokland was first able to beat the reigning Norwegian champion Gerd von der Lippe to take back-to-back Norwegian titles in 1963 and 1964—before Berthelsen started a winning streak in that event as well.

However, Berthelsen was entirely absent from the Norwegian championships in the standing long jump. Here, Lange Hokland took silver medals in 1961, 1962 and 1963, followed by gold medals in 1964, 1965 and 1966, and then a bronze and silver in 1968 and 1969 (her last national medal). Lange also had an unprecedented run with the Norwegian record in the event. Her jump 2.76 metres at the University of Oslo's Blindern campus in February 1964 was only a 1-centimetre improvement, but she proceeded with 2.77 (1965), 2.79 twice, 2.80 and finally 2.88 metres in March 1966 in Sandnes. This record stood until 1981.

== International career ==
Lange finally made her real international debut at the 1962 European Championships. Here she finished 11th in the long jump, having recorded a better mark in the qualifying round.

Her next international outing was the 1964 Olympic Games in Tokyo. She competed in long jump and pentathlon and finished sixteenth in both events. In addition to her pentathlon score of 4429 points being the Norwegian record, her high jump result of 1.63 metres was also a tied Norwegian record. In this event, she took over the record in 1965 when jumping 1.66 in Haugesund, which stood for two years. Hokland's Norwegian titles in the high jump in 1965 and 1966 were her only medals in that event. The same thing happened in the 80 metres hurdles event: two national titles in 1965 and 1966 and no other medals.

In 1965, Hokland participated in the European Cup, finishing fifth in the high jump, sixth in the javelin throw, and third in the 4 x 100 metres relay. At the 1965 Nordic Championships, she finished second in the long jump and pentathlon and won the 4 x 100 metres relay. With the national team, she set multiple record in this event as well: 47.3 seconds in 1964 followed by 47.2 and 47.0 in 1965. This record stood for one year. In the javelin throw, she won Norwegian championships in 1963, 1964 and 1965, followed by her fourth silver in that event in 1966. Her 48.38 metres from 1965 stood as the championship record until 1973.

At the 1966 European Indoor Games, Hokland finished fifth in the long jump and reached the semi-final of the 60 metres. At the 1966 European Championships, she finished tenth in the pentathlon but did not reach the long jump final.

== Personal and professional life ==
Oddrun Lange moved to Ås for her studies, graduating as an agronomist from the Norwegian College of Agriculture in 1961. She worked in Statens plantevern with agricultural pest control from 1962 to 1969.

Ahead of the 1963 athletic season, she changed clubs from Olymp to IL i BUL. She became an honorary member of this club.

She married Reidulf Hokland in Vistdal Church in 1964. From 1969 they led a life as farmers on remote Kveøya, Kvæfjord Municipality. Being active in the local sports club Kvæfjord IL, she was an athletics trainer and referee, held board memberships in her club and the district association (friidrettskrets). She eventually was a board member of the Norwegian Athletics Association and of the Norwegian Agrarian Association.

She died in March 2022, incidentally one month after Berit Berthelsen.
