= Heinz-Gerd Mölders =

German steeplechase runner

Personal information
- Nationality: German
- Born: 8 February 1942 (age 84)

Sport
- Sport: Middle-distance running
- Event: Steeplechase

Heinz-Gerd Mölders (born 8 February 1942) is a German middle-distance runner. He competed in the men's 3000 metres steeplechase at the 1968 Summer Olympics in Mexico under the team Federal Republic of Germany (FRG).

== Biography ==
Heinz-Gerd Mölders, a steeplechaser, was eliminated in the preliminary rounds of the 1968 Mexico City Olympics. In 1969, West Germany boycotted the Olympic and although Mölders was nominated to compete, the boycott prevented him from doing so. In 1984 (M40) and 1988 (M45), Mölders won the steeplechase in the senior classes, but did not claim a national West German title.

Mölders personal best was 3000S – 8:37.2 (1968) at the Summer Olympics in Mexico.
