= Jan Cych =

Polish middle-distance runner (1944–2024)

Personal information
- Nationality: Polish
- Born: 20 April 1944 Obernigk, Gau Lower Silesia, Germany (now Oborniki Śląskie, Poland)
- Died: 12 July 2024 (aged 80)

Sport
- Sport: Middle-distance running
- Event: Steeplechase

Jan Cych (20 April 1944 – 12 July 2024) was a Polish middle-distance runner. He competed in the men's 3000 metres steeplechase at the 1968 Summer Olympics. He died on 12 July 2024, at the age of 80.
