= Nordic Athletics Championships =

International athletics competition

- Sport: Track and field
- Founded: 1961
- Folded: 1965, resumed in 2023
- Country: Finland, Sweden, Norway, Denmark and Iceland

The Nordic Athletics Championships is an international athletics competition between Nordic countries – Finland, Sweden, Norway, Denmark and Iceland. In its original form, it was held on three occasions, in 1961, 1963 and 1965.

In the 2000s, there were several Nordic Championships held for under-20 and under-23 athletes. In 2023, the senior competition was revitalized and held again in Copenhagen.

== Events ==
The competition programme featured a total of 34 individual Nordic Championship athletics events, 22 for men and 12 for women. The limited number of events for women reflected that of the Olympic programme of the time. In 2023, it returned with an equal number of events for both sexes, save for the women's steeplechase.

Running

- 100 metres, 200 metres, 400 metres, 800 metres, 1500 metres (men only), 5000 metres (men only), 10,000 metres (men only), marathon (men only)

Obstacle events

- 80 metres hurdles (women only), 110 metres hurdles (men only), 400 metres hurdles (men only), 3000 metres steeplechase (men only)

Jumping events

- Pole vault (men only), high jump, long jump, triple jump (men only)

Throwing events

- Shot put, discus throw, javelin throw, hammer throw (men only)

Relays

- 4 × 100 metres relay, 4 × 400 metres relay (men only)

Combined events

- Pentathlon (women only), decathlon (men only)

== Editions ==
Year	Date	Venue	Country	Winning men's nation	Winning women's nation
1961	31 July-2 August	Oslo	Norway	Finland	Sweden
1963	21-22 September	Gothenburg	Sweden	Finland	Sweden
1965	15-16 August	Helsinki	Finland	Finland	Finland
2023	27-28 May	Copenhagen	Denmark	Sweden	Finland
2024	18-19 May	Malmö	Sweden		
