= Larbi Oukada =

Moroccan middle-distance runner

Personal information
- Nationality: Moroccan
- Born: 26 June 1946 (age 80)

Sport
- Sport: Middle-distance running
- Event: Steeplechase

Larbi Oukada (born 26 June 1946) is a Moroccan middle-distance runner. He competed in the men's 3000 metres steeplechase at the 1968 Summer Olympics.
