= John Jackson (athlete) =

British middle-distance runner

Personal information
- Nationality: British (English)
- Born: 29 September 1941 (age 84) Stoke-on-Trent, England
- Height: 180 cm (5 ft 11 in)
- Weight: 62 kg (137 lb)

Sport
- Sport: Athletics
- Events: Middle-distance running Steeplechase
- Club: North Staffs and Stone Harriers
Medal record
Representing Great Britain
Summer Universiade
Silver medal – second place	1967 Tokyo	3000m steeplechase
Bronze medal – third place	1967 Tokyo	5000m

John McKenzie Jackson (born 29 September 1941) is a British former middle-distance runner who competed at the 1968 Summer Olympics.

== Biography ==
Jackson finished second behind Gareth Bryan-Jones in the steeplechase event at the 1968 AAA Championships. Later that year at the 1968 Olympic Games in Mexico City, he represented Great Britain in the men's 3000 metres steeplechase competition.

Jackson became the British steeplechase champion after winning the British AAA Championships title at the 1969 AAA Championships.
