= Kęstutis Orentas =

Lithuanian long-distance runner (born 1939)

Personal information
- Nationality: Lithuanian
- Born: 15 March 1939 (age 87) Šakiai, Lithuania

Sport
- Sport: Long-distance running
- Event: 5000 metres

Kęstutis Orentas (born 15 March 1939) is a Lithuanian former long-distance runner. He competed in the men's 5000 metres at the 1964 Summer Olympics, held world record in the event.
