= József Mácsár =

Hungarian middle-distance runner (1938–1996)

Personal information
- Nationality: Hungarian
- Born: 13 September 1938 Gyöngyöspata, Hungary
- Died: 18 December 1996 (aged 58) Budapest, Hungary

Sport
- Sport: Middle-distance running
- Event: Steeplechase

József Mácsár (13 September 1938 – 18 December 1996) was a Hungarian middle-distance runner. He competed in the men's 3000 metres steeplechase at the 1964 Summer Olympics. Mácsár died on 18 December 1996, at the age of 58.
