= Van Nelson =

American long-distance runner

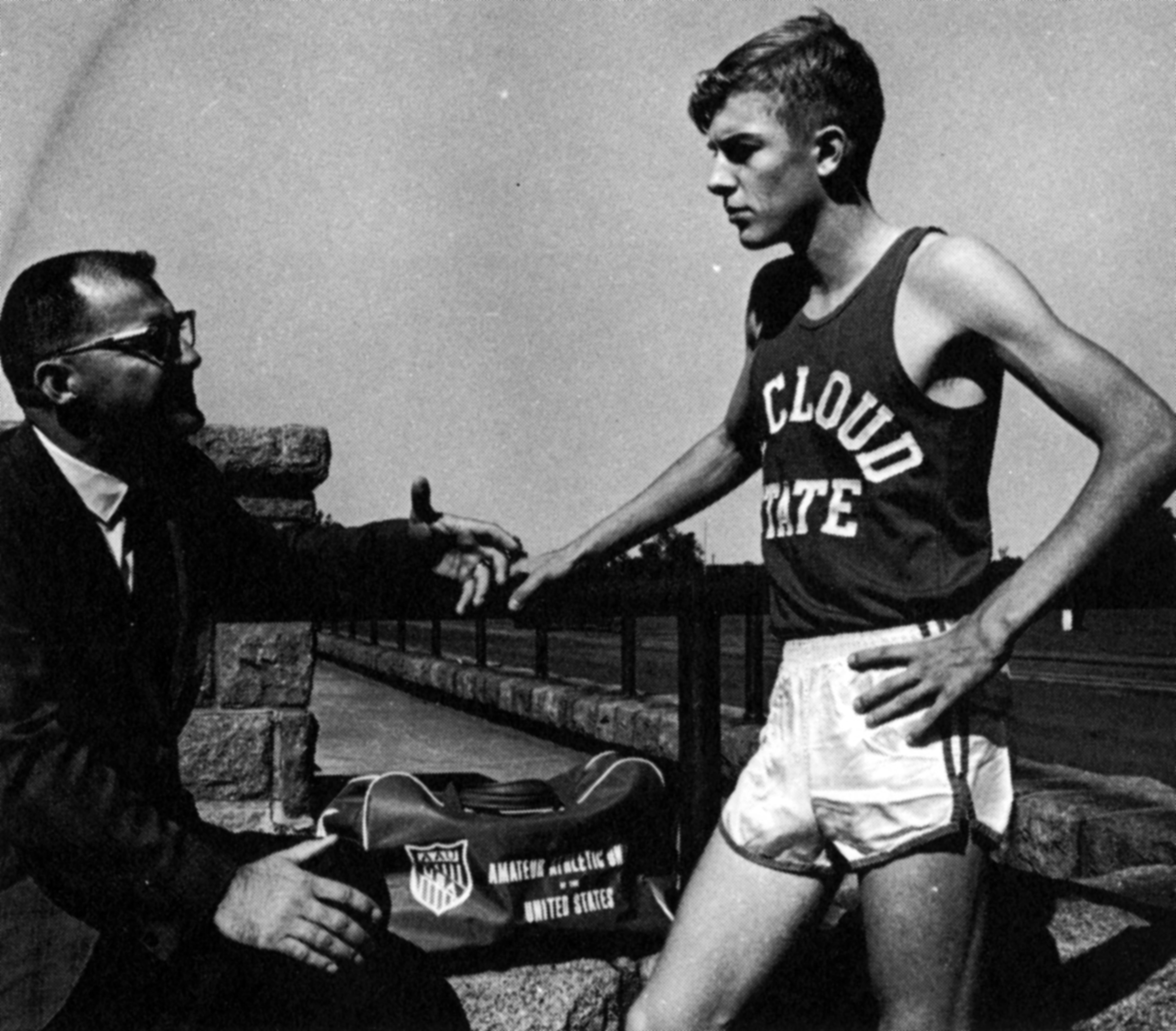
- St. Cloud State cross country coach Bob Tracy (left) and runner Van Nelson (right), St. Cloud State University, 1967

Personal information
- Born: November 24, 1945 (age 80) Minneapolis, Minnesota, U.S.

Sport
- Sport: Track and field
Medal record
Representing United States
World Student Games
Silver medal – second place	1967 Tokyo	5000 m
Silver medal – second place	1967 Tokyo	10,000 m
Pan American Games
Gold medal – first place	1967 Winnipeg	5000 m
Gold medal – first place	1967 Winnipeg	10,000 m

Van Arthur Nelson (born November 24, 1945) is an American former long-distance runner. An Olympian in 1968, he won long-distance track doubles at both the 1967 World Student Games and the 1967 Pan American Games.

Born in Minneapolis, Nelson attended Washburn High School and began competing in middle distance events there. He broke the school record for the mile run and was ranked fifth nationally as a high school runner in 1964. He graduated that year (later being inducted into the school's hall of fame) and went on to study at St. Cloud State University. He competed collegiately for the St. Cloud State Huskies in NAIA competitions. He was the team's captain in both track and field and cross country and won seven titles and 12 All-American honours during his four years representing the institution. He was inducted into the St. Cloud Hall of Fame in 1983, featuring in the second group of athletes to be given the honour.

At the Drake Relays, he won both the three-mile and six-mile races three times consecutively from 1966 to 1968. The 1967 season was the peak of Nelson's career. He won the Amateur Athletic Union six-mile title then completed a 5000 meters/10,000 meters track double at the 1967 World Student Games. He repeated this feat at the 1967 Pan American Games in Winnipeg, becoming the second man to complete the long-distance double after Argentina's Osvaldo Suárez.

Nelson made his Olympic debut in the 10,000 m at the 1968 Summer Olympics in Mexico City. He was not used to the hot conditions or altitude and his performance suffered as a result. In spite of being ranked eighth in the world for that event, he finished in 28th place with a time of 31:40.2 minutes. Although, he had not performed well, he was pleased to have represented his country at the competition.

Nelson returned to his studies at St. Cloud State in 1969, but the year after he suffered a serious back injury due to heavy lifting and the surgery that followed impaired his running ability. He made his last international appearance in 1971 and retired thereafter, although he continued running for pleasure. Nelson has retired from his job as a health teacher, although he still substitute teaches. He is now a para-profesional at South View Middle School in Edina, MN.
