= Viktor Kudynskyi =

Ukrainian athlete (1942–2005)

Medal record

Men's athletics

Representing Soviet Union

European Championships
| Gold medal – first place | 1966 Budapest | 3000 m st. |

Viktor Kudynskyi or Viktor Kudynskyy (17 June 1942 – 18 August 2005) was a Ukrainian athlete who competed in the 1968 Summer Olympics.
