= Sven-Olov Larsson =

Swedish runner

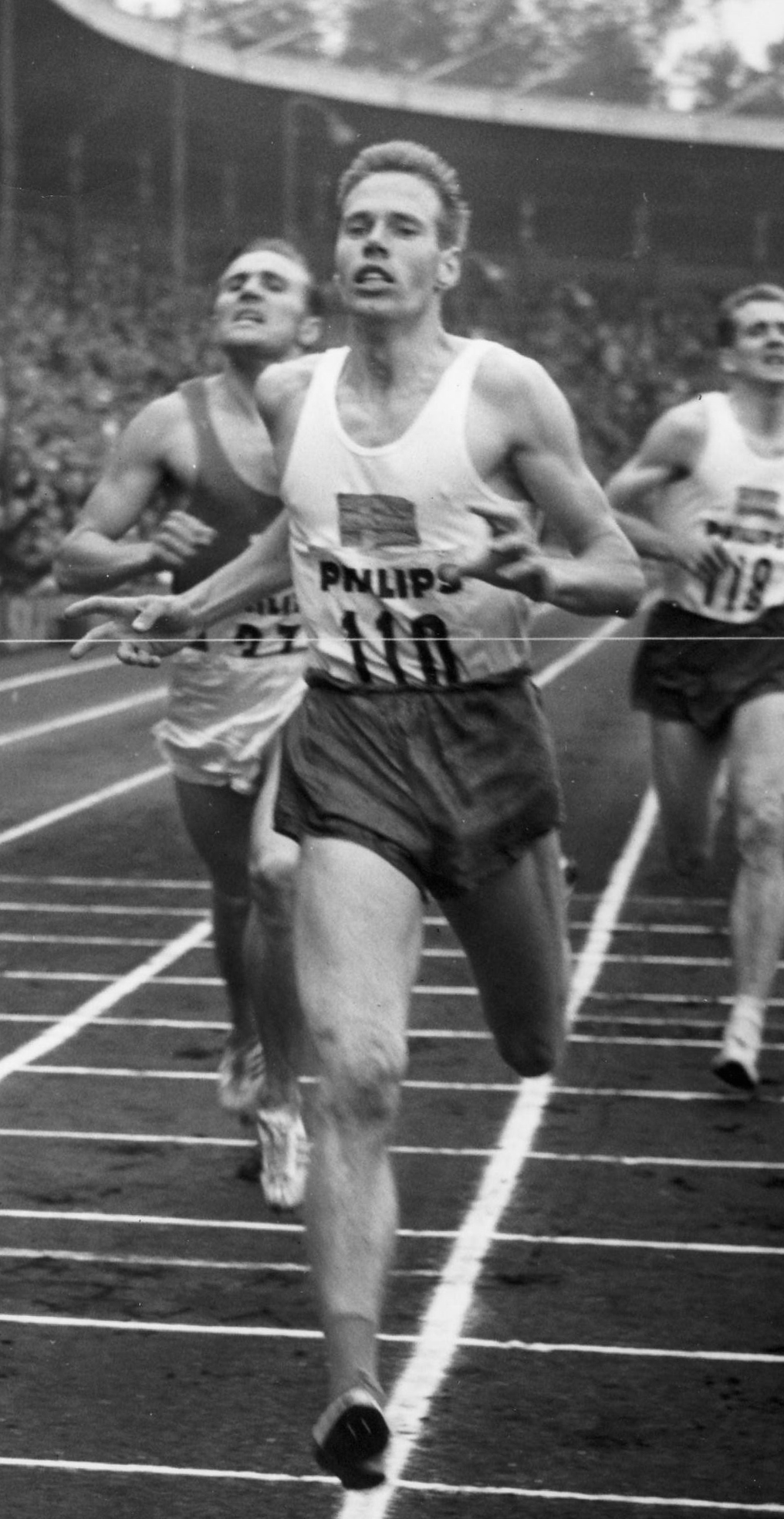
- Sven-Olov Larsson running 1500 m in 1963

Personal information
- Born: 24 May 1938 Flen, Sweden
- Died: 21 August 2024 (aged 86)
- Height: 1.75 m (5 ft 9 in)
- Weight: 62 kg (137 lb)

Sport
- Sport: Athletics
- Events: 1,500 m; 5,000 m
- Club: IFK Sundsvall

Achievements and titles
- Personal bests: 1,500 m – 3.43.2 (1963); 5,000 m – 13:49.2 (1963)

Sven-Olov Martin "Esso" Larsson (24 May 1938 – 21 August 2024) was a Swedish runner. He competed in the 5,000 m event at the 1964 Summer Olympics, but failed to reach the final.
