= Gaston Roelants =

Athletics competitor, long distance runner, steeplechase, cross country

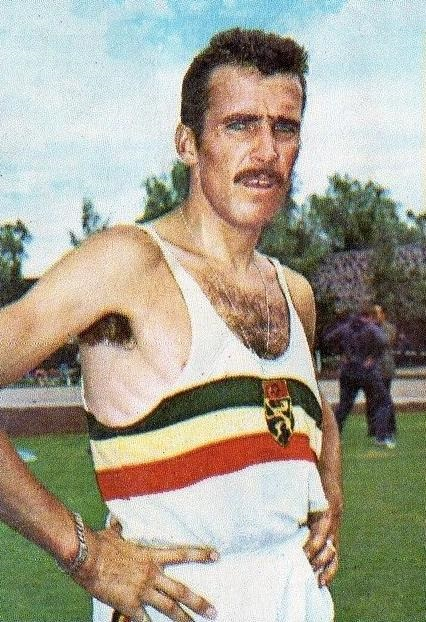
- Gaston Roelants in 1968

Personal information
- Nationality: Belgian
- Born: 5 February 1937 (age 89) Opvelp, Belgium
- Height: 1.74 m (5 ft 9 in)
- Weight: 67 kg (148 lb)

Sport
- Country: Belgium
- Sport: Athletics
- Event(s): Steeplechase, marathon
- Club: DC Leuven
- Retired: 1976

Achievements and titles
- Personal best(s): 3000 m Steeplechase – 8:26.4 (1965) marathon – 2:16:30 (1974)
Medal record
Men's athletics
Representing Belgium
Olympic Games
Gold medal – first place	1964 Tokyo	3000 m st.
European Championships
Gold medal – first place	1962 Belgrade	3000 m st.
Silver medal – second place	1969 Athens	Marathon
Bronze medal – third place	1966 Budapest	3000 m st.
Bronze medal – third place	1974 Rome	Marathon

Gaston, Baron Roelants (born 5 February 1937), is a Belgian former elite steeplechaser and cross country runner. He won the 1962 European and 1964 Olympic titles in the 3000 m steeplechase and twice broke the world record.

== Biography ==
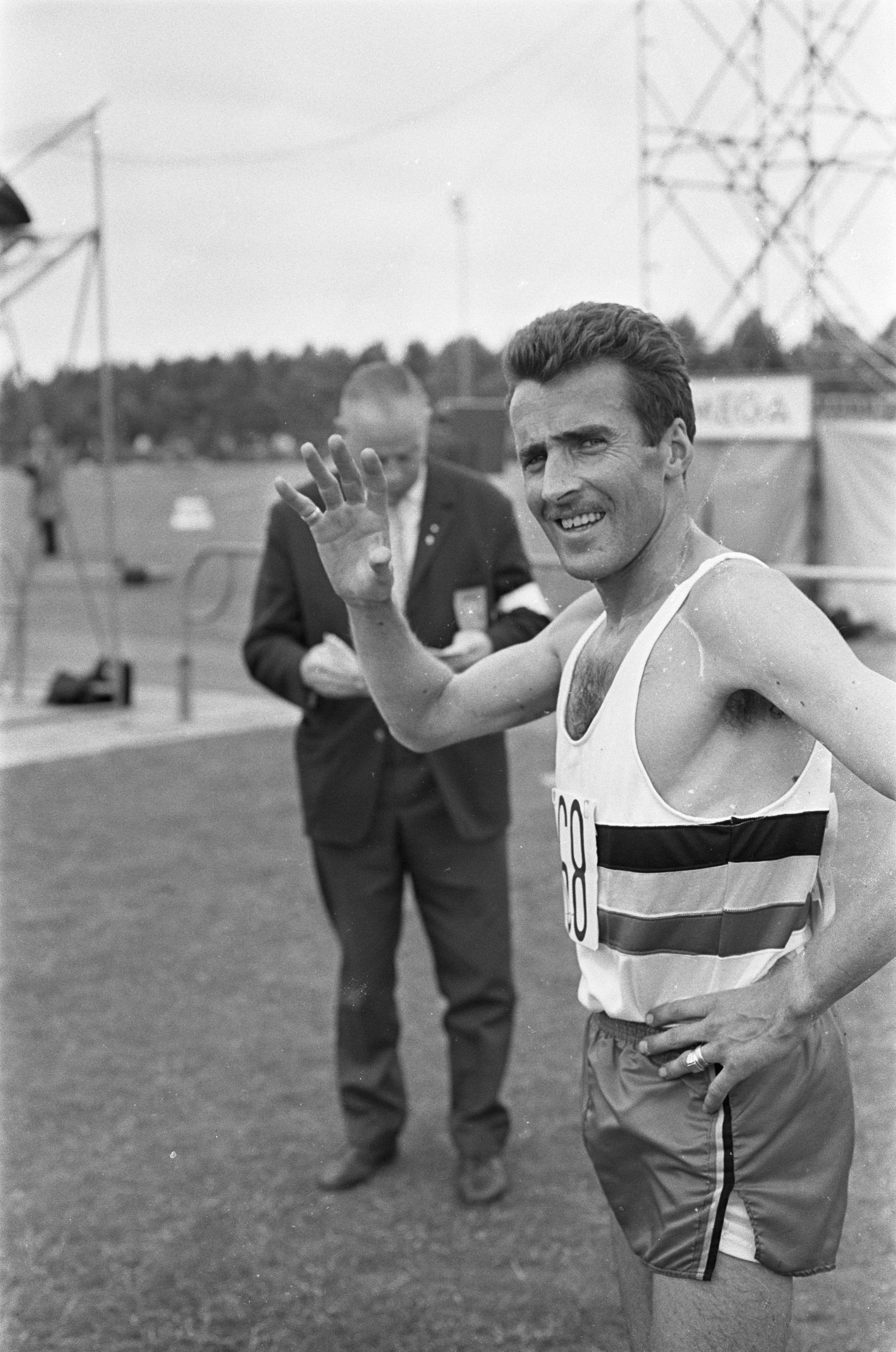
Gaston Roelants in 1967

Roelants finished fourth in the steeplechase at the 1960 Olympics, and after winning a bronze medal at the 1966 European Championships he successfully turned to longer distances, setting world records in the 20 km (58 minutes 6.2 seconds) and in the 1 hour race (20,664 m) that year. In 1972 he improved those records to 57 minutes 44.4 seconds and 20,878 meters. He won a silver (1969) and a bronze (1974) medal in European marathon races. He was ranked the world's best steeplechaser five times, in 1962–1965 and 1967.

Roelants also won four international cross country titles (1962, 1967, 1969 and 1972) with three second places between 1960 and 1975. His long career continued into his 40s. Later he won five world titles in the masters category and held the masters world record in the steeplechase for 27 years.

A major Belgian road race is named after Roelants.

Records
Preceded by Zdzisław Krzyszkowiak	Men's 3000 m steeplechase world record holder 7 September 1963 – 17 July 1968	Succeeded by Jouko Kuha
