= Gunilla Cederström =

Swedish athletics competitor

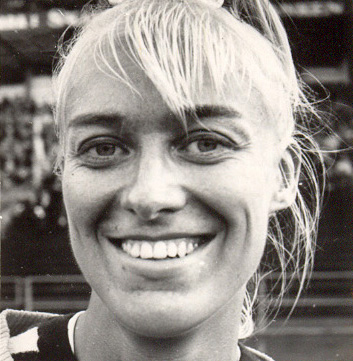

Personal information
- Born: 16 January 1943 (age 83) Jönköping, Sweden
- Height: 1.79 m (5 ft 10 in)
- Weight: 68 kg (150 lb)

Sport
- Sport: Athletics
- Event(s): pentathlon Long jump
- Club: Malmö AI

Achievements and titles
- Personal best(s): Pentathlon – 4708 (1968); LJ – 6.08 m (1968)

Eva Gunilla Cederström (later Warchalowski, born 19 May 1944) is a retired Swedish track and field athlete who competed at the 1968 Summer Olympics in the long jump and pentathlon. She was the Swedish champion in the long jump (1961–64 and 1968), standing long jump (1959–62 and 1965), pentathlon (1961) and 4 × 100 m relay (1961, 1964–66 and 1968), and held national record in the long jump and pentathlon. She also competed in volleyball.
