= Reijo Höykinpuro =

Finnish long-distance runner (1933–2024)

Personal information
- Full name: Reijo Untamo Höykinpuro
- Nationality: Finnish
- Born: 16 August 1933
- Died: 16 February 2024 (aged 90)

Sport
- Sport: Long-distance running
- Event: 5000 metres

Reijo Untamo Höykinpuro (16 August 1933 – 16 February 2024) was a Finnish long-distance runner. He competed in the men's 5000 metres at the 1960 Summer Olympics. Höykinpuro died on 16 February 2024, at the age of 90.
