= Bengt-Göran Fernström =

Swedish sprinter

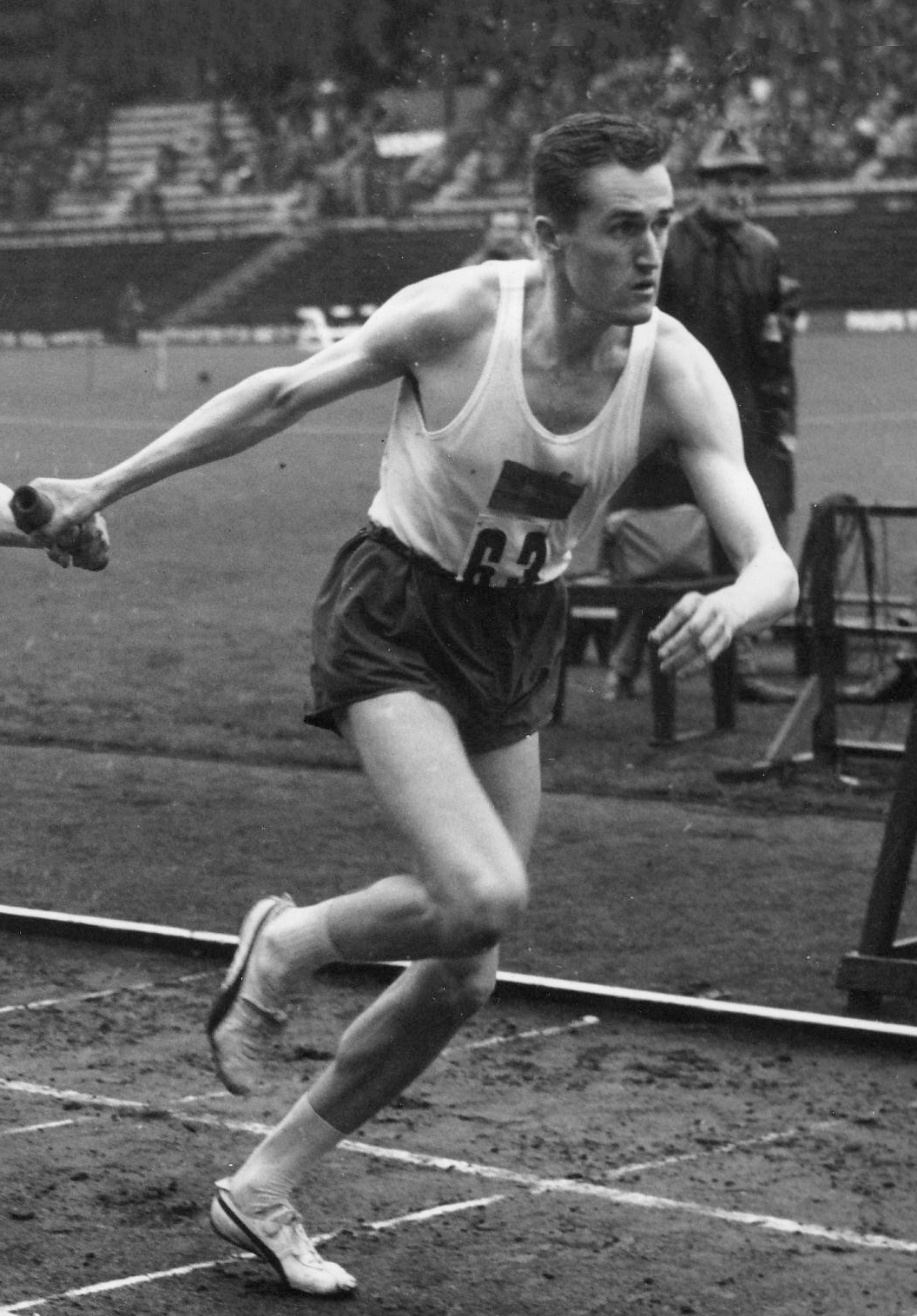
- Fernström in 1962

Personal information
- Born: 12 May 1941 (age 85) Sweden

Sport
- Sport: Athletics
- Event: 400 metres
- Club: SoIK Hellas

Bengt-Göran Fernström (born 12 May 1941) is a retired Swedish sprinter. He competed in the 4 × 400 m relay at the 1962 European Athletics Championships and finished in fourth place. Individually he won three national titles: in the 200 m (1962) and 400 m (1962–1963). His daughters Maria, Helena and Linda also competed in sprint running.
