= Fergus Murray =

British athlete

Personal information
- Full name: Alistair Fergus Murray
- Nationality: British (Scottish)
- Born: 11 September 1942 (age 83) Dundee, Scotland
- Height: 179 cm (5 ft 10 in)
- Weight: 66 kg (146 lb)

Sport
- Sport: Long-distance running
- Event: 10,000 metres
- Club: Dundee Hawks; Edinburgh Southern Harriers
Medal record
Representing Great Britain
Summer Universiade
Bronze medal – third place	1965 Budapest	5000 metres

Alistair Fergus Murray (born 11 September 1942) is a British long-distance runner. He educated at the High School of Dundee and the University of Edinburgh.

He competed in the men's 10,000 metres at the 1964 Summer Olympics.

In October 1967 he made his debut for his new club Edinburgh Southern Harriers after joining them from Dundee Hawks, due to his job at Fettes College.
