= Erik Uddebom =

Swedish shot putter and discus thrower

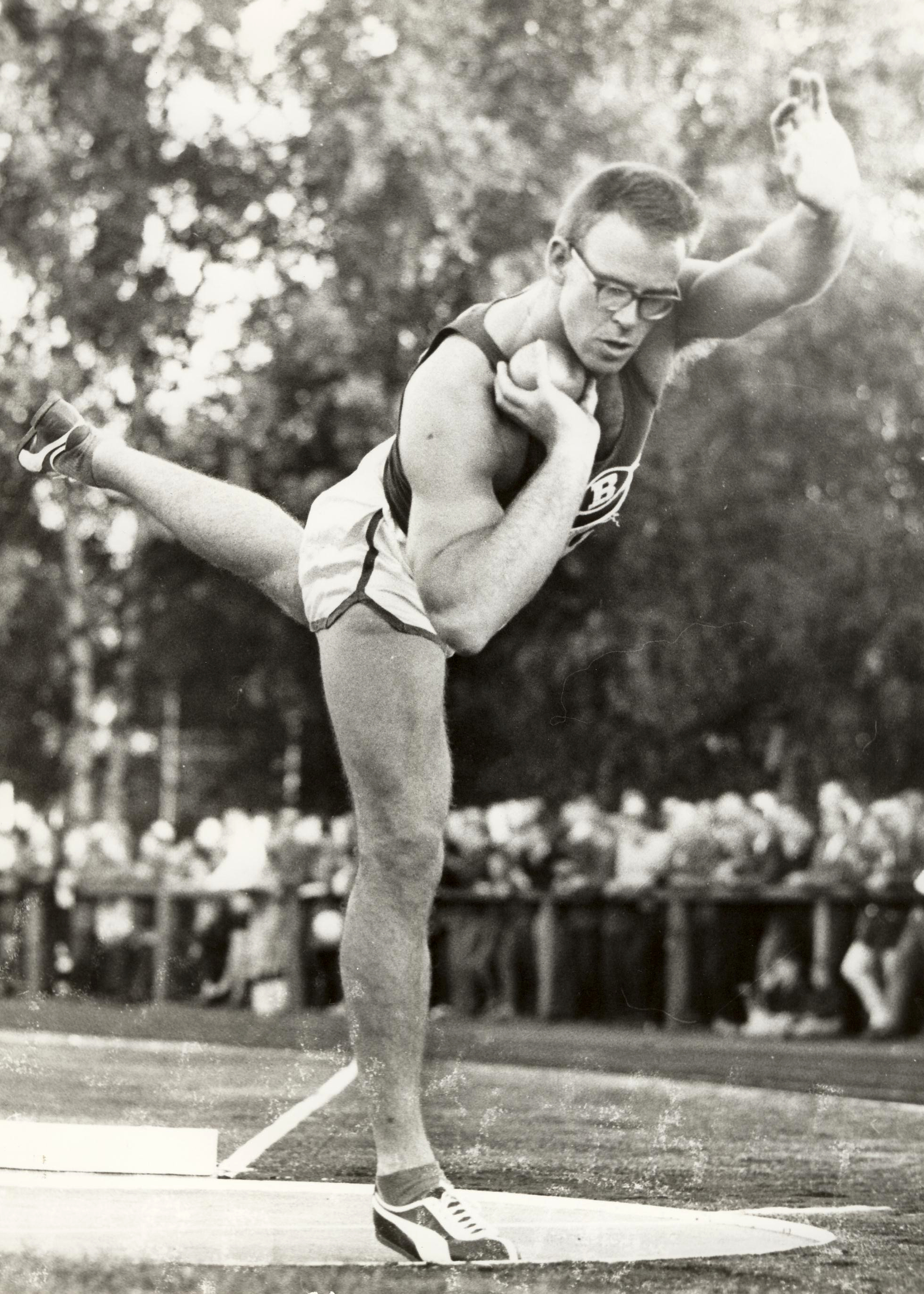

Personal information
- Born: 5 July 1934 (age 91) Stockholm, Sweden
- Height: 1.93 m (6 ft 4 in)
- Weight: 107 kg (236 lb)

Sport
- Sport: Athletics
- Event(s): Shot put, discus throw, javelin throw, high jump
- Club: Bromma IF

Achievements and titles
- Personal best(s): SP – 17.67 m (1962); DT – 57.80 m (1966); JT – 60.54 m HJ – 1.85 m

Erik "Myggan" Uddebom (born 5 July 1934) is a retired Swedish athlete. He competed in the shot put and discus throw at the 1956 and 1960 Olympics with the best result of sixth place in the shot put in 1956. He set 11 national shot put records and was the first Swede to break the 17 meter barrier in this event.

Uddebom won the national titles in the shot put (1955–57, 1959–61, 1963–64), discus throw (1956, 1961) and weightlifting (1964), and also competed in the javelin throw and high jump. For many years he was director of the Stora Grabbars Association.
