= Risto Ankio =

Finnish pole vaulter

Personal information
- Nationality: Finnish
- Born: 15 April 1937 (age 89) Viiala, Finland
- Height: 185 cm (6 ft 1 in)
- Weight: 75 kg (165 lb)

Sport
- Sport: Athletics
- Event: Pole vault
- Club: Viialan Viri

Risto Ankio (born 15 April 1937) is a Finnish athlete. He competed in the men's pole vault at the 1964 Summer Olympics.

Ankio won the British AAA Championships title in the pole vault event at the 1961 AAA Championships.
