= Juhani Manninen =

Finnish long jumper

Personal information
- Nationality: Finnish
- Born: 4 May 1941 (age 85)

Sport
- Sport: Athletics
- Event: Long jump

Juhani Manninen (born 4 May 1941) is a Finnish athlete. He competed in the men's long jump at the 1960 Summer Olympics.
