= Stein Haugen =

Norwegian discus thrower (1933–2008)

Stein Haugen (10 January 1933 – 31 March 2008) was a Norwegian discus thrower.

He was born in Lom Municipality, but represented IL i BUL. He died in March 2008 in Bærum Municipality.

At the 1960 Summer Olympics he finished eleventh in the discus final with a throw of 53.36 metres. He competed in the European Championships in 1958 and 1962, without reaching the final. He became Norwegian champion in discus throw in the years 1958–1964. In 1959 and 1960 he became national champion in shot put as well.

His personal best throw was 56.37 metres, achieved in June 1964 in Stockholm.
