= Lutz Philipp =

German long-distance runner (1940–2012)

Personal information
- Nationality: German
- Born: 14 October 1940 Königsberg, East Prussia, Germany
- Died: 1 February 2012 (aged 71) Darmstadt, Germany
- Height: 178 cm (5 ft 10 in)
- Weight: 69 kg (152 lb)

Sport
- Sport: Long-distance running
- Club: LBV Phönix / ASC Darmstadt
Medal record
Representing West Germany
Summer Universiade
| Silver medal – second place | 1965 Budapest | 5000m |
| Bronze medal – third place | 1967 Tokyo | 10,000m |

Lutz Philipp (14 October 1940 – 1 February 2012) was a German long-distance runner. He competed at the 1964, 1968 and 1972 Summer Olympics.

Philipp won the British AAA Championships title in the marathon event at the 1972 AAA Championships.
