= Keisuke Sawaki =

Japanese long-distance runner

Personal information
- Born: 8 December 1943 (age 82) Osaka Prefecture, Japan

Sport
- Sport: Track and field
Medal record
Representing Japan
Asian Games
Gold medal – first place	1966 Bangkok	1500m
Gold medal – first place	1966 Bangkok	5000m
Summer Universiade
Gold medal – first place	1965 Budapest	5000m
Gold medal – first place	1967 Tokyo	5000m
Gold medal – first place	1967 Tokyo	10,000m

Keisuke Sawaki (澤木 啓祐, Sawaki Keisuke; born 8 December 1943) is a Japanese former long-distance runner who competed in the 1968 Summer Olympics and in the 1972 Summer Olympics.
