= Lage Tedenby =

Swedish long-distance runner (1937–2026)

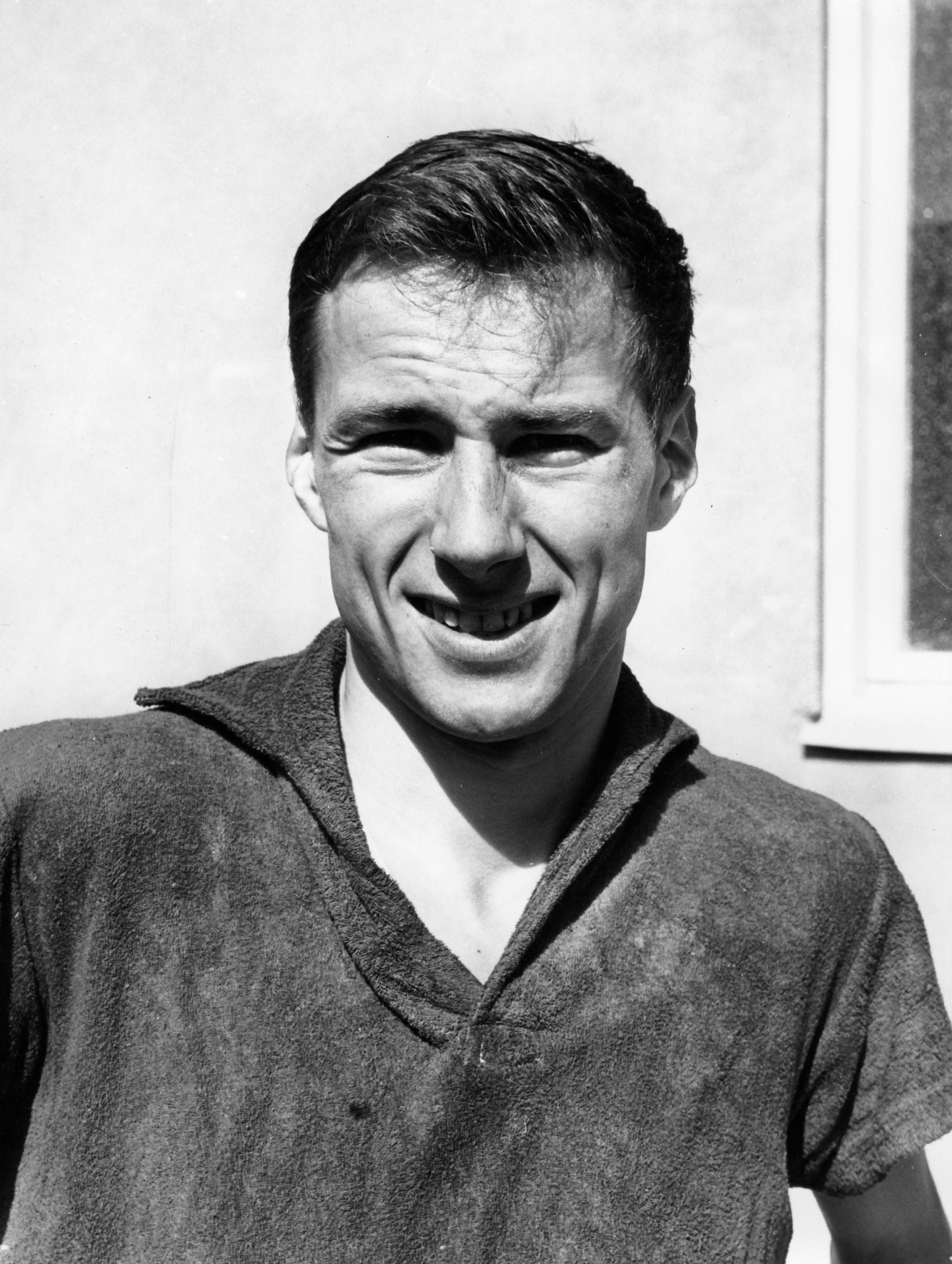
- Tedenby between 1960 and 1962

Personal information
- Born: 21 May 1937 Nätra, Sweden
- Died: 18 May 2026 (aged 88) Karlstad, Sweden
- Height: 1.77 m (5 ft 10 in)
- Weight: 68 kg (150 lb)

Sport
- Sport: Athletics
- Events: Steeplechase, 10,000 m
- Club: IF Vingarna; Hofors AIF; Kils AIK

Achievements and titles
- Personal best: 3000 mS – 8:39.8 (1961)

Lage Herbert Tedenby (21 May 1937 – 18 May 2026) was a Swedish long-distance runner. He competed in the steeplechase at the 1960 Summer Olympics, but failed to reach the final. Tedenby won the steeplechase at the 1961 Nordic Championships. Later he had a serious traffic collision, but recovered and won the national 10,000 m title in 1967. Tedenby died in Karlstad on 18 May 2026, at the age of 88.
