= Nina Hansen =

Danish long jumper

Personal information
- Nationality: Danish
- Born: 8 May 1942 (age 84)

Sport
- Sport: Athletics
- Event: Long jump

Nina Hansen (born 8 May 1942) is a Danish athlete. She competed in the women's long jump at the 1964 Summer Olympics.
