= Jouko Kuha =

Finnish former long-distance runner (born 1939)

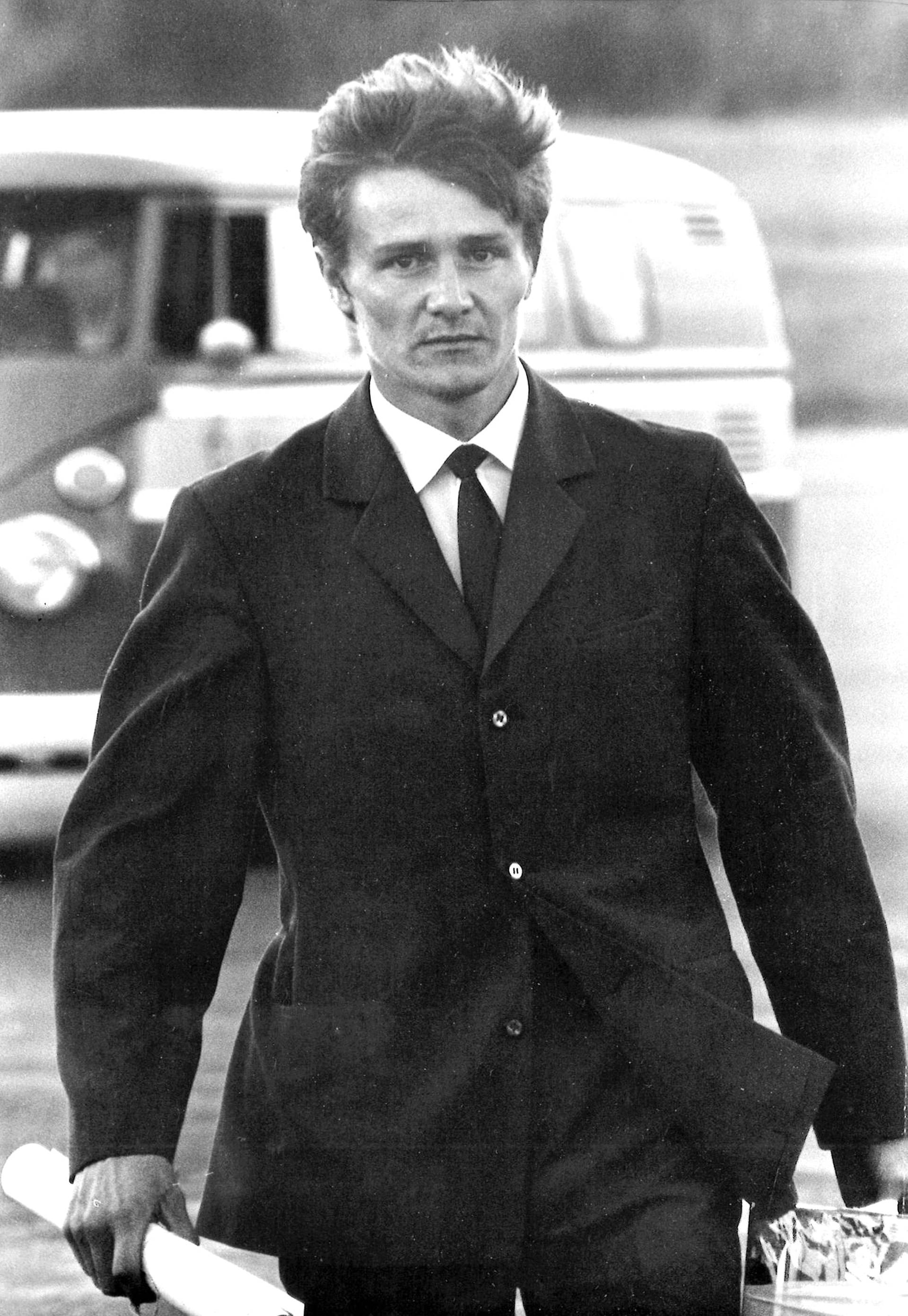
- Jouko Kuha in 1968

Personal information
- Born: 30 September 1939 (age 86) Ranua, Finland

Sport
- Sport: Track and field
Medal record
Representing Finland
Summer Universiade
| Gold medal – first place | 1967 Tokyo | 3000m steeplechase |

Jouko Santeri Kuha (born 30 September 1939) is a Finnish former long-distance runner, who specialized in the 3000 metres steeplechase. In 1968 he broke the world record with a result of 8:24.2.

== Career ==
Kuha's international breakthrough was at the Finland-Sweden athletics international in 1965 when he beat Bengt Persson with the Finnish record of 8:37.6. In the same year he was ranked ninth at the annual ranking of Track and Field News.

At the 1966 European Championships in Budapest, Kuha ran a new Finnish record of 8:36.2 in the heats, but did not qualify for the final. Kuha realized that in order to reach the world's top he would be forced to leave Finland's winter conditions and conduct his training in warmer climates. He was the first Finnish runner to train in foreign countries, thus becoming a trendsetter for later Finnish runners who had success in the 1970s.

In 1967, Kuha improved his Finnish record with a time of 8:29.8 in Stockholm, that season's second best time in the world after Gaston Roelants. In the same year he won the 3000 metres steeplechase at the Universiades in Tokyo. He ranked fifth in Track and Field News' annual world ranking in 1967.

He prepared to spend the summer of 1968 training in the village of Penedo in Itatiaia, Brazil. That year, he set a world record on 17 July in Stockholm. His 1000 metres lap time was only 2:51.0, 1500 metres 4:17.2, and 2000 metres 5:43.2. However, Kuha was known for his fast final laps and again he sprinted to a world record time of 8:24.2, over 2 seconds faster than the previous record by Gaston Roelants. Kuha knew that as a sea-level inhabitant he would not succeed at the high altitude of Mexico City and therefore he did not travel to the 1968 Summer Olympics. He ranked tenth in Track and Field News' annual world ranking in 1968.

Kuha's top season ended after Achilles tendon surgery in 1969. He still continued his career at the national level and competed at the Finnish Championships in Athletics at the age of 40 in 1980.

== Trivia ==
Kuha's world record was threatened to be disqualified, because competition organizers provided bib numbers with the BP logo, which was against amateur athletics' rules in that era.

Kuha did not earn much money during his career. One week after setting the world record, he competed in Joensuu before well over 6000 spectators. Kuha had agreed to a fee the previous spring of 600 Finnish markkas, which corresponds to 824 Euros in 2008 currency.

During his career 1958–95 Kuha ran the 3000 metres steeplechase 170 times. At the age of 41 (1981) he ran with a time of 9:00.61 and at about two months prior to his 50th birthday in 1989, 9:37.79.

Records
| Preceded by (Belgium) Gaston Roelants | Men's 3000 m steeplechase world record holder 17 July 1968 – 19 August 1969 | Succeeded by (Soviet Union) Vladimiras Dudinas |
Sporting positions
| Preceded by (Belgium) Gaston Roelants | Men's 3000 m steeplechase best year performance 1968 | Succeeded by (Soviet Union) Vladimiras Dudinas |
