= Gioacchino De Palma =

Italian long-distance runner

Personal information
- Nationality: Italian
- Born: 21 May 1940 (age 86) Bari, Italy

Sport
- Sport: Long-distance running
- Event: Marathon

Gioacchino De Palma (born 21 May 1940) is an Italian long-distance runner. He competed in the marathon at the 1968 Summer Olympics.
