= Karen Inge Halkier =

Danish discus thrower

Personal information
- Nationality: Danish
- Born: 30 May 1937
- Died: 15 August 2005 (aged 68)

Sport
- Sport: Athletics
- Event: Discus throw

Karen Inge Halkier (30 May 1937 – 15 August 2005) was a Danish athlete. She competed in the women's discus throw at the 1960 Summer Olympics.
