= Carl Fredrik Bunæs =

Norwegian sprinter (1939–2022)

Personal information
- Nationality: Norwegian
- Born: 16 October 1939 Drammen, Norway
- Died: 6 October 2022 (aged 82) Oslo, Norway

Sport
- Sport: Athletics
- Event(s): 100m, 200m
- Club: IK Tjalve

Achievements and titles
- Olympic finals: Quarter-finals, 1960

Carl Fredrik Bunæs (16 October 1939 – 6 October 2022) was a Norwegian sprint runner.

== Career ==
Bunæs was born in Drammen on 16 October 1939. He competed in 100 metres and 200 metres at the 1960 Summer Olympics in Rome, reaching the quarter finals in both events.

He won a total of 18 individual titles at the Norwegian Athletics Championships between 1957 and 1966, in 100 metres, 200 metres and 400 metres.

Bunæs died in Oslo on 6 October 2022, at the age of 82.
