= Jan-Erik Karlsson =

Swedish steeplechase runner (born 1939)

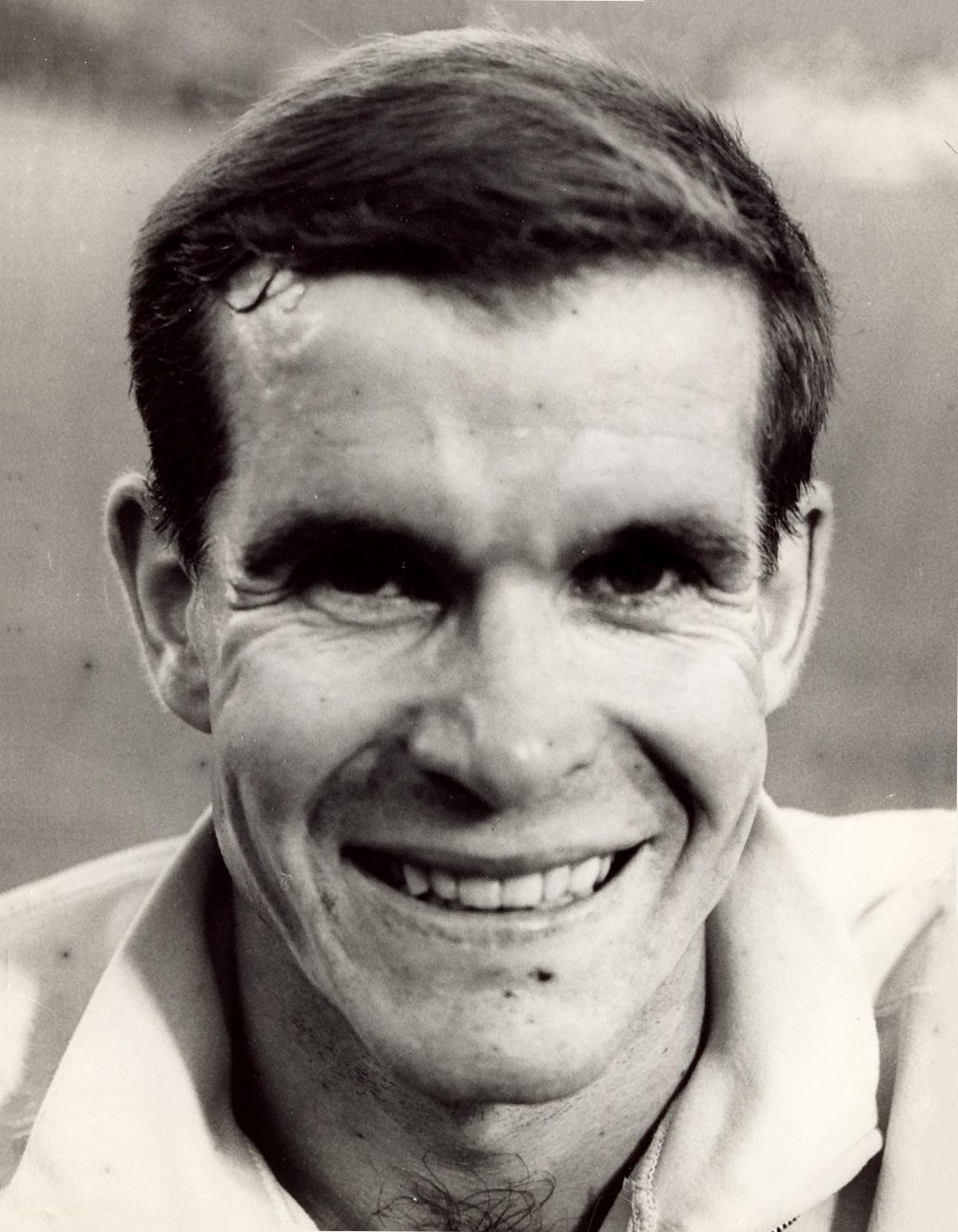

Personal information
- Born: 3 October 1939 (age 86) Gothenburg, Sweden
- Height: 1.83 m (6 ft 0 in)
- Weight: 70 kg (150 lb)

Sport
- Sport: Athletics
- Event(s): Steeplechase; 3000–10,000 m
- Club: IK Vikingen, Göteborg

Achievements and titles
- Personal best(s): 3000 mS – 8:38.6 (1966); 3000 m – 8.22.8; 5000 m – 14:20.4; 10,000 m – 30:47.4

Jan-Erik Karlsson (born 3 October 1939) is a retired Swedish steeplechase runner. He competed at the 1966 European Athletics Championships and 1968 Summer Olympics, but failed to reach the finals.
