= Bengt Persson (athlete) =

Swedish athletics competitor (1939–2013)

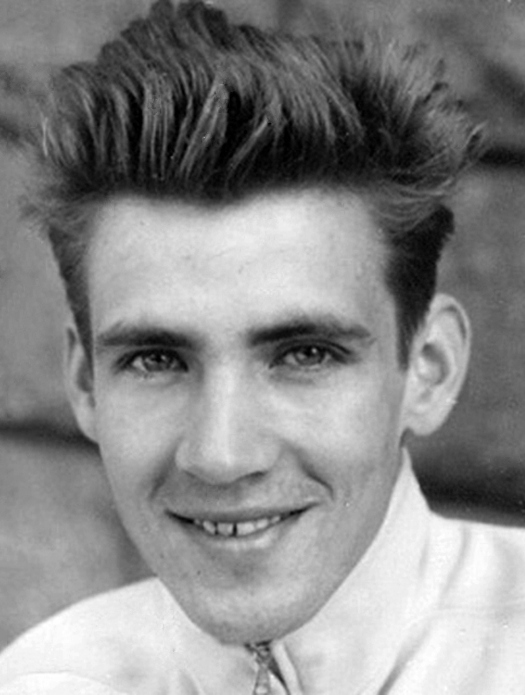

Personal information
- Born: 31 October 1939 Lövånger, Sweden
- Died: 14 November 2013 (aged 74) Visby, Sweden
- Height: 1.71 m (5 ft 7 in)
- Weight: 59 kg (130 lb)

Sport
- Sport: Athletics
- Event(s): Steeplechase, 1500–10,000 m
- Club: IFK Umeå

Achievements and titles
- Personal best(s): 3000 mS – 8:33.8 (1968); 3000 m – 7:57.8; 5000 m – 13:48.6; 10,000 m – 29:36.2

Bengt Asbjörn "BP" Persson (31 October 1939 – 14 November 2013) was a Swedish runner. He competed in the steeplechase at the 1966 European Athletics Championships, 1968 Summer Olympics, and 1969 European Athletics Championships and placed 9th, 10th and 11th, respectively. Persson won the steeplechase at the Nordic Championships in 1963 and 1965. He was the Swedish champion in the steeplechase (1963–69), 5000 m (1965), 10,000 m (1965), 12 km cross country (1964–66), and 4 × 1500 m relay (1965–67).
