= Elisabeth Östberg =

Swedish sprinter (born 1940)

Personal information
- Born: 29 August 1940
- Died: 10 April 2023 (aged 82)

Sport
- Sport: Athletics
- Event: 200–800 m
- Club: Göteborgs KIK; IFK Lidingö

Achievements and titles
- Personal best(s): 400 m – 55.4 (1967); 800 m – 2:06.1
Medal record
Representing Sweden
Summer Universiade
Gold medal – first place	1967 Tokyo	400 m
Bronze medal – third place	1967 Tokyo	800 m

Elisabeth Östberg (29 August 1940 – 10 April 2023) was a Swedish sprinter. She won national titles in the 400 m (1959, 1961 and 1964–65), 800 m (1961) and 4 × 400 m relay (11 times) and held the national record over 800 m. Östberg was part of the Swedish 4 × 400 m relay team that placed sixth at the 1969 European Championships. After retiring from competitions she worked as a coach, in Sweden and abroad.
