= Athletics at the 1967 Summer Universiade =

Athletics at the V Summer Universiade
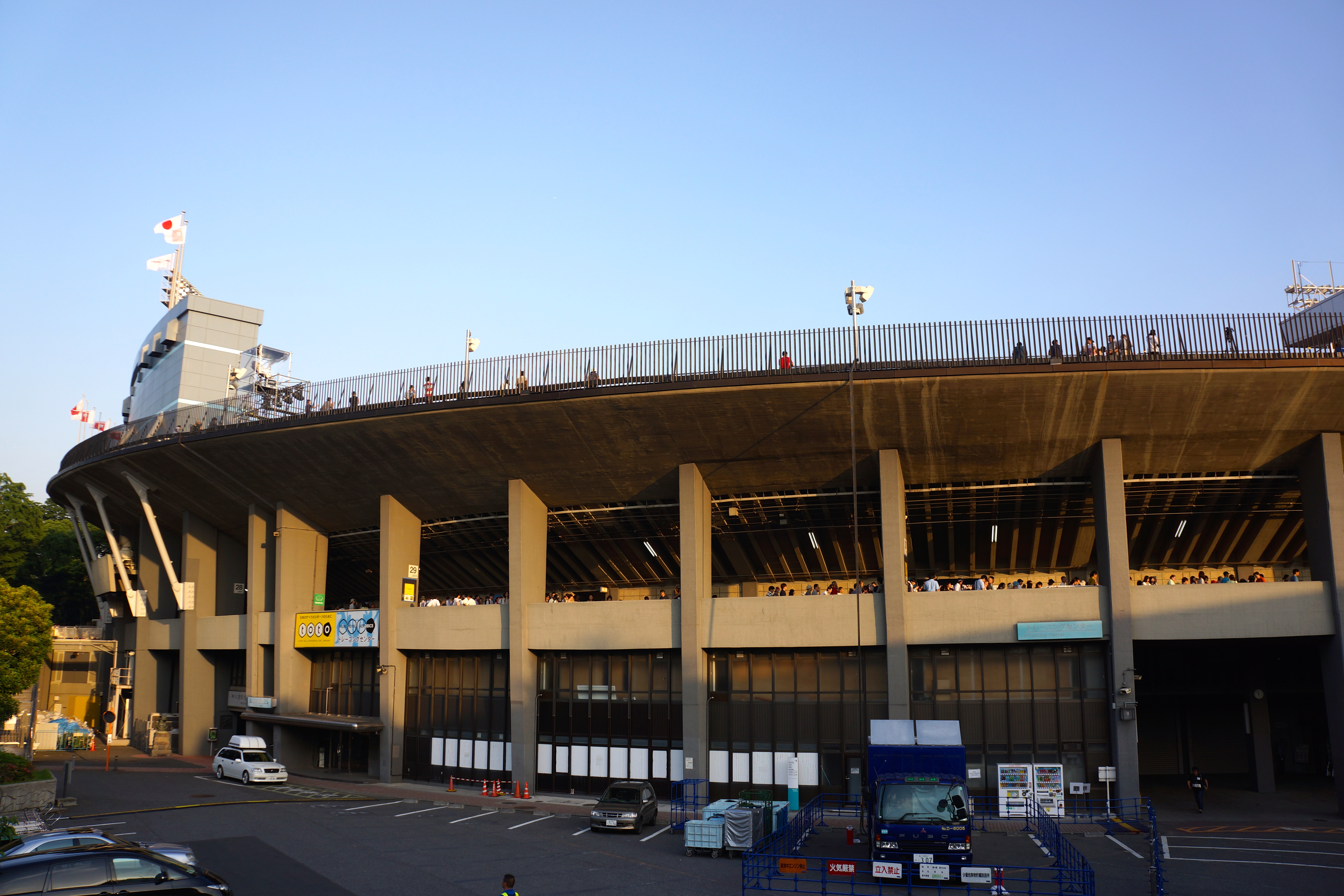
- The host stadium
- Dates: 30 August – 4 September
- Host city: Tokyo, Japan
- Venue: National Olympic Stadium
- Events: 33

Athletics events were contested at the 1967 Summer Universiade in Tokyo, Japan.

== Medal summary ==
=== Men ===
Event	Gold		Silver		Bronze	
100 metres (wind: -0.4 m/s)	Gaoussou Koné (CIV)	10.4	Tommie Smith (USA)	10.5	Ippolito Giani (ITA)	10.7
200 metres (wind: -1.1 m/s)	Tommie Smith (USA)	20.7	Menzies Campbell (GBR)	21.2	Ippolito Giani (ITA)	21.3
400 metres	Ingo Röper (FRG)	46.0	Helmar Müller (FRG)	46.6	Sergio Bello (ITA)	46.7
800 metres	Ralph Doubell (AUS)	1:46.7	Franz-Josef Kemper (FRG)	1:46.7	Bodo Tümmler (FRG)	1:47.8
1500 metres	Bodo Tümmler (FRG)	3:43.4	Dave Bailey (CAN)	3:43.5	Gianni del Buono (ITA)	3:44.0
5000 metres	Keisuke Sawaki (JPN)	14:03.8	Van Nelson (USA)	14:05.4	John Jackson (GBR)	14:06.6
10,000 metres	Keisuke Sawaki (JPN)	29:00.0	Van Nelson (USA)	29:00.6	Lutz Philipp (FRG)	29:21.4
110 metres hurdles (wind: -0.3 m/s)	Eddy Ottoz (ITA)	13.9	Ron Copeland (USA)	14.0	Pierre Schoebel (FRA)	14.3
400 metres hurdles	Ron Whitney (USA)	49.8	John Sherwood (GBR)	50.2	Kiyoo Yui (JPN)	51.2
3000 metres steeplechase	Jouko Kuha (FIN)	8:38.2	John Jackson (GBR)	8:42.8	Nobuyoshi Miura (JPN)	8:52.2
4 × 100 metres relay	Italy (ITA); Vittorio Roscio; Ennio Preatoni; Ippolito Giani; Livio Berruti	39.8	Japan (JPN); Naoki Abe; Junji Ishikawa; Yosiyuki Moriya; Shinji Ogura	40.2	Great Britain (GBR); Bob Frith; Menzies Campbell; Mike Hauck; Jim Barry	40.3
4 × 400 metres relay	West Germany (FRG); Werner Thiemann; Rolf Krüsmann; Helmar Müller; Ingo Röper	3:06.7	Great Britain (GBR); Howard Davies; Mike Hauck; Menzies Campbell; John Sherwood	3:06.7	Australia (AUS); Ralph Doubell; Peter Griffin; Phil King; Greg Lewis	3:08.4
High jump	Miodrag Todosijevic (YUG)	2.05	Hidehiko Tomizawa (JPN)	2.05	Hiromasa Kinoshita (JPN)	2.05
Pole vault	Heinfried Engel (FRG)	5.00	Bob Seagren (USA)	4.80	Alain Moreaux (FRA)	4.80
Long jump	Naoki Abe (JPN)	7.71	Graham Taylor (AUS)	7.65	Pertti Pousi (FIN)	7.57
Triple jump	Michael Sauer (FRG)	16.07	Pertti Pousi (FIN)	15.94	Giuseppe Gentile (ITA)	15.84
Shot put	Neal Steinhauer (USA)	19.19	Traugott Glöckler (FRG)	18.59	Antero Juntto (FIN)	17.24
Discus throw	Gary Carlsen (USA)	59.84	Hein-Direck Neu (FRG)	55.34	Neal Steinhauer (USA)	53.16
Hammer throw	Yoshihisa Ishida (JPN)	64.94	Heiner Liewald (FRG)	62.18	Shigenobu Murofushi (JPN)	61.76
Javelin throw	Dave Travis (GBR)	76.64	Michel Pougheon (FRA)	70.34	Hisao Yamamoto (JPN)	67.72
Decathlon	Hans-Joachim Walde (FRG)	7819	Jörg Mattheis (FRG)	7486	Bernard Castang (FRA)	7444

=== Women ===
Event	Gold		Silver		Bronze	
100 metres (wind: -0.3 m/s)	Barbara Ferrell (USA)	11.6	Gabrielle Meyer (FRA)	11.7	Gerlind Beyrichen (FRG)	12.1
200 metres (wind: +0.5 m/s)	Gabrielle Meyer (FRA)	23.8	Barbara Ferrell (USA)	23.9	Jannette Champion (GBR)	24.7
400 metres	Elisabeth Östberg (SWE)	55.4	Gabriele Grossekettler (FRG)	56.0	Biruta Vilmanis (AUS)	56.5
800 metres	Madeline Manning (USA)	2:06.8	Abby Hoffman (CAN)	2:08.5	Elisabeth Östberg (SWE)	2:08.9
80 metres hurdles (wind: -0.5 m/s)	Françoise Masse (FRA)	11.3	Sheila Garnett (GBR)	11.3	Ayako Natsume (JPN)	11.3
4 × 100 metres relay	France (FRA); Anne-Marie Grosse; Françoise Masse; Michèle Alayrangues; Gabrielle Meyer	46.5	Japan (JPN); Miho Sato; Ritsuko Sukegawa; Miyoko Tsujishita; Ayoko Natsume	46.5	West Germany (FRG); Bärbel Palmi; Marlies Fünfstück; Gabriele Großekettler; Gerlinde Beyrichen	46.8
High jump	Mami Takeda (JPN)	1.68	Linda Knowles (GBR)	1.68	Liese Prokop (AUT)	1.68
Long jump	Sheila Parkin (GBR)	6.32	Bärbel Palmié (FRG)	6.17	Anne-Marie Grosse (FRA)	5.96
Shot put	Liesel Westermann (FRG)	15.30	Ryoko Sugiyama (JPN)	15.04	Brigitte Berendonk (FRG)	14.36
Discus throw	Liesel Westermann (FRG)	59.22	Brigitte Berendonk (FRG)	53.16	Iris Malnig (AUT)	46.16
Javelin throw	RaNae Bair (USA)	52.98	Sakiko Hara (JPN)	48.38	Michèle Demys (FRA)	48.20
Pentathlon	Liese Prokop (AUT)	4465	Michiko Okamoto (JPN)	4355	Pirkko Heikkilä (FIN)	4274

== Medal table ==
Rank	Nation	Gold	Silver	Bronze	Total
1	West Germany (FRG)	8	9	5	22
2	United States (USA)	7	6	1	14
3	Japan (JPN)	5	6	6	17
4	France (FRA)	3	2	5	10
5	Great Britain (GBR)	2	6	3	11
6	Italy (ITA)	2	0	5	7
7	Finland (FIN)	1	1	3	5
8	Australia (AUS)	1	1	2	4
9	Austria (AUT)	1	0	2	3
10	Sweden (SWE)	1	0	1	2
11	Ivory Coast (CIV)	1	0	0	1
11	Yugoslavia (YUG)	1	0	0	1
13	Canada (CAN)	0	2	0	2
Totals (13 entries)		33	33	33	99

== See also ==
- FISU World University Games
- University and college sport
