= 1967 Summer Universiade =

Multi-sport event in Tokyo, Japan

V Summer Universiade 第5回 夏季ユニバーシアード
- Host city: Tokyo, Japan
- Nations: 32
- Athletes: 937
- Events: 86 in 10 sports
- Opening: August 26, 1967
- Closing: September 4, 1967
- Opened by: Hirohito; Emperor of Japan
- Torch lighter: Keisuke Sawaki
- Main venue: National Stadium

The 1967 Summer Universiade, also known as the V Summer Universiade, was a multi-sport event for university athletes that took place in Tokyo, Japan.

Eastern Bloc countries including Soviet Union, Romania, Hungary, Bulgaria, Poland, Cuba, Czechoslovakia and North Korea boycotted the Games due to the naming disputes about North Korea.

== Sports at the 1967 Summer Universiade ==
- Athletics (33)
- Basketball (2)
- Diving (4)
- Fencing (7)
- Gymnastics (3)
- Judo (7)
- Swimming (22)
- Tennis (5)
- Volleyball (2)
- Water polo (1)

== Medal table ==
* Host nation (Japan)

Rank	Nation	Gold	Silver	Bronze	Total
1	United States (USA)	32	23	7	62
2	Japan (JPN)*	22	18	24	64
3	West Germany (FRG)	8	9	5	22
4	Great Britain (GBR)	4	11	7	22
5	France (FRA)	4	6	14	24
6	Italy	4	5	9	18
7	Australia (AUS)	2	1	3	6
7	Sweden (SWE)	2	1	3	6
9	Switzerland (SUI)	2	0	0	2
10	South Korea (KOR)	1	9	2	12
11	Finland (FIN)	1	1	3	5
12	Netherlands (NED)	1	1	1	3
13	Austria (AUT)	1	0	4	5
14	Spain (ESP)	1	0	1	2
15	Ivory Coast (CIV)	1	0	0	1
15	Yugoslavia (YUG)	1	0	0	1
17	Canada (CAN)	0	2	0	2
18	Mexico (MEX)	0	1	0	1
18	Philippines (PHI)	0	1	0	1
20	Brazil (BRA)	0	0	6	6
21	Belgium (BEL)	0	0	1	1
21	Hong Kong (HKG)	0	0	1	1
21	Indonesia (INA)	0	0	1	1
21	Portugal (POR)	0	0	1	1
Totals (24 entries)		87	89	93	269
