= Athletics at the 1968 Summer Olympics – Men's pole vault =

Men's pole vault at the Games of the XIX Olympiad
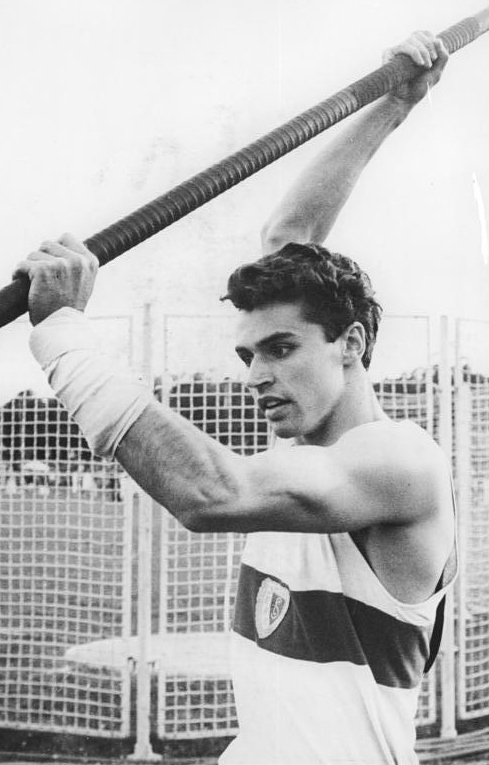
- Eventual bronze medallist Wolfgang Nordwig led the qualifying round alongside John Pennel.
- Venue: Estadio Olímpico Universitario
- Dates: 14 and 16 October 1968
- Competitors: 23 from 15 nations
- Winning height: 5.40 OR

Medalists
1st place, gold medalist(s)		Bob Seagren; United States
2nd place, silver medalist(s)		Claus Schiprowski; West Germany
3rd place, bronze medalist(s)		Wolfgang Nordwig; East Germany

Video on YouTube @ 10:20 Official Video

The men's pole vault was one of four men's jumping events on the athletics program at the 1968 Summer Olympics. The competition had two rounds, qualifying and a final, which were held on 14 and 16 October respectively at the Estadio Olímpico Universitario in Mexico City. Twenty-three athletes from 15 nations competed. The maximum number of athletes per nation had been set at 3 since the 1930 Olympic Congress. The event was won by Bob Seagren of the United States, the nation's 16th consecutive victory in the men's pole vault. Claus Schiprowski of West Germany took silver, while Wolfgang Nordwig of East Germany took bronze—the first medals for each of those nations as separate teams, though two West German vaulters had earned silver and bronze for the United Team of Germany in 1964.

== Background ==
This was the 16th appearance of the event, which is one of 12 athletics events to have been held at every Summer Olympics. The returning finalists from the 1964 Games were bronze medalist Klaus Lehnertz of the United Team of Germany (now representing West Germany), fifth-place finisher Hennadiy Bleznitsov of the Soviet Union, eleventh-place finisher John Pennel of the United States, fifteenth-place finishers Herve D'Encausse of France and Ignacio Sola of Spain, and eighteenth-place finisher Christos Papanikolau of Greece. Bob Seagren was the world record holder and the favorite, though Pennel (who had held the record for parts of 1963, 1964, 1966, and 1967) was also a strong contender.

Argentina made its first appearance in the event; East Germany and West Germany competed separately for the first time. The United States made its 16th appearance, the only nation to have competed at every Olympic men's pole vault to that point.

== Competition format ==
The competition consisted of two rounds, qualification and final. In both rounds, each athlete had three attempts at each height and was eliminated from the competition if he failed to clear that height. Athletes could choose to pass onto the next height, although any failed attempts were carried over into that height. The heights increased in increments of five centimetres. Athletes who successfully jumped the qualifying height 4.90 m (16 ft 3/4 in) progressed to the final round. In the event that fewer than twelve athletes cleared that height, the best twelve athletes (including those tied with athletes in the top twelve) would progress to the next round.

== Records ==
Prior to the competition, the existing World and Olympic records were as follows.

World record	Bob Seagren (USA)	5.41	Los Angeles, United States	25 July 1964
Olympic record	Fred Hansen (USA)	5.10	Tokyo, Japan	17 October 1964

Eleven men cleared 5.15 metres or higher to break the old Olympic record. Nine cleared 5.20 metres or higher. Seven cleared 5.25 metres or higher. Six cleared 5.30 metres. Five cleared 5.35 metres (or higher). The three medalists, Bob Seagren, Claus Schiprowski, and Wolfgang Nordwig, all cleared 5.40 metres—where the Olympic record sat after the competition, as none could clear higher.

== Schedule ==
Date	Time	Round
Monday, 14 October 1968	10:00	Qualifying
Wednesday, 16 October 1968	12:30	Final

== Results ==
Key

- o = Height cleared
- x = Height failed
- – = Height passed
- r = Retired
- SB = Season's best
- PB = Personal best
- NR = National record
- AR = Area record
- OR = Olympic record
- WR = World record
- WL = World lead
- NM = No mark
- DNS = Did not start
- DQ = Disqualified

=== Qualifying ===
Rank	Group	Athlete	Nation	4.20	4.30	4.40	4.50	4.60	4.70	4.75	4.80	4.85	4.90	Height	Notes
1	A	Wolfgang Nordwig	East Germany	—	—		—	–	–	–	–	–	o	4.90	Q
1	A	John Pennel	United States	—	—	—	—	–	–	–	–	–	o	4.90	Q
3	A	Altti Alarotu	Finland	—	—	—	—	–	o	–	–	–	o	4.90	Q
3	A	Erkki Mustakari	Finland	—	—	—	—	o	–	–	–	–	o	4.90	Q
3	A	Hervé d'Encausse	France	—	—	—	—	–	–	–	o	–	o	4.90	Q
3	A	Claus Schiprowski	West Germany	—	—	—	—	–	–	–	o	–	o	4.90	Q
3	A	Christos Papanikolaou	Greece	—	—	—	—	–	–	–	o	–	o	4.90	Q
3	A	Hennadiy Bleznitsov	Soviet Union	—	—	—	—	o	–	–	–	–	o	4.90	Q
9	B	Ignacio Sola	Spain	–	–	–	–	o	–	–	o	–	o	4.90	Q
9	B	Mike Bull	Great Britain	–	–	–	–	o	–	–	o	–	o	4.90	Q
9	B	Kiyoshi Niwa	Japan	–	–	–	–	o	–	–	o	–	o	4.90	Q
12	B	Aleksandr Malyutin	Soviet Union	–	–	xxo	o	–	o	–	xxo	–	o	4.90	Q
13	A	Bob Seagren	United States	—	—	—	—	–	–	–	–	–	xo	4.90	Q
14	A	Kjell Isaksson	Sweden	—	—	—	—	–	o	–	–	–	xo	4.90	Q
15	A	Heinfried Engel	West Germany	—	—	—	—	o	–	–	o	–	xxo	4.90	Q
16	B	Pantelis Nikolaidis	Greece	–	–	o	–	o	–	–	o	—	xxx	4.80	
17	B	Erico Barney	Argentina	o	o	–	xo	o	xxo	–	o	—	xxx	4.80	
18	B	Klaus Lehnertz	West Germany	–	–	o	–	o	–	o	—	xxx	—N/a	4.75	
19	B	John-Erik Blomqvist	Sweden	–	–	–	–	o	–	xxo	–	–	xxx	4.75	
20	A	Casey Carrigan	United States	—	—	—	—	o	–	–	–	–	xxx	4.60	
21	B	Wu Ah-min	Taiwan	o	o	–	o	xxx	—N/a					4.50	
22	B	Heinz Wyss	Switzerland	–	xo	–	o	–	r	—N/a				4.50	
—	B	Ingo Peyker	Austria	–	–	–	xxx	—N/a						No mark	
—	A	Renato Dionisi	Italy	DNS											
—	B	Dominique Rakotarahalahy	Madagascar	DNS											
—	B	Aldo Righi	Italy	DNS											
—	B	Steen Smidt-Jensen	Denmark	DNS											

=== Final ===
With three men tied at 5.40 metres, the countback rules determined the medals. At the final height (5.40), Nordwig had failed twice before clearing while the other two men had each failed only once before succeeding; Nordwig therefore took third place and the bronze medal. Because Seagren and Schiprowski were matched at one failure at 5.40 metres, the total number of failures for each before that was the next tiebreaker. Seagren had failed once before 5.40 metres (at 5.20), while Schiprowski had failed twice (at 5.25 and 5.35); Seagren therefore was the gold medalist and Schiprowski took silver.

Rank	Athlete	Nation	4.60	4.80	4.90	5.00	5.05	5.10	5.15	5.20	5.25	5.30	5.35	5.40	5.45	Height	Notes
1st place, gold medalist(s)	Bob Seagren	United States	–	–	–	–	o	–	–	xo	–	o	–	xo	xxx	5.40	OR
2nd place, silver medalist(s)	Claus Schiprowski	West Germany	–	–	o	o	–	o	–	o	xo	o	xo	xo	xxx	5.40	OR
3rd place, bronze medalist(s)	Wolfgang Nordwig	East Germany	–	–	–	xo	–	–	–	o	–	o	o	xxo	xxx	5.40	OR
4	Christos Papanikolaou	Greece	–	o	–	o	–	–	o	–	xo	xo	o	xxx	—N/a	5.35	
5	John Pennel	United States	–	–	–	–	o	–	–	xo	–	xo	xxo	xxx	—N/a	5.35	
6	Hennadiy Bleznitsov	Soviet Union	o	–	o	–	–	o	–	o	–	xo	xxx	—N/a		5.30	
7	Hervé d'Encausse	France	–	–	–	o	–	–	xo	–	o	–	xxx	—N/a		5.25	
8	Heinfried Engel	West Germany	–	o	–	xxo	–	xo	–	o	xxx	—N/a				5.20	
9	Ignacio Sola	Spain	–	xo	–	o	–	xo	o	xxo	xxx	—N/a				5.20	
10	Kjell Isaksson	Sweden	–	–	o	–	xo	–	o	xxx	—N/a					5.15	
11	Kiyoshi Niwa	Japan	–	o	o	o	–	o	xo	xxx	—N/a					5.15	
12	Aleksandr Malyutin	Soviet Union	o	–	o	o	–	xxx	—N/a							5.00	
13	Mike Bull	Great Britain	–	xo	o	xo	–	xxx	—N/a							5.00	
14	Altti Alarotu	Finland	–	–	–	xxo	r	—N/a								5.00	
—	Erkki Mustakari	Finland	–	xxx	—N/a											No mark	
