= 1966 European Athletics Championships – Men's pole vault =

Men's pole vault at the European Athletics Championships

The men's pole vault at the 1966 European Athletics Championships was held in Budapest, Hungary, at Népstadion on 31 August and 2 September 1966.

== Medalists ==
Gold	Wolfgang Nordwig; East Germany
Silver	Christos Papanikolaou; Greece
Bronze	Hervé d'Encausse; France

== Results ==
=== Final ===
2 September

Rank	Name	Nationality	Result	Notes
1st place, gold medalist(s)	Wolfgang Nordwig	East Germany	5.10	CR
2nd place, silver medalist(s)	Christos Papanikolaou	Greece	5.05	NR
3rd place, bronze medalist(s)	Hervé d'Encausse	France	5.00	
4	Renato Dionisi	Italy	4.80	
5	Ignacio Sola	Spain	4.80	
6	Włodzimierz Sokołowski	Poland	4.80	
7	Leszek Butscher	Poland	4.80	
8	Claus Schiprowski	West Germany	4.70	
9	Klaus Lehnertz	West Germany	4.70	
10	Igor Feld	Soviet Union	4.70	
11	Waldemar Węcek	Poland	4.70	
12	Rudolf Tomášek	Czechoslovakia	4.60	
13	Altti Alarotu	Finland	4.60	
14	Karl-Gustav Burlin	Sweden	4.60	
15	Jean-Pierre Colusso	France	4.40	
16	Mike Bull	Great Britain	4.40	

=== Qualification ===
31 August

Rank	Name	Nationality	Result	Notes
	Christos Papanikolaou	Greece	4.60	Q
	Ignacio Sola	Spain	4.60	Q
	Hervé d'Encausse	France	4.60	Q
	Leszek Butscher	Poland	4.60	Q
	Wolfgang Nordwig	East Germany	4.60	Q
	Klaus Lehnertz	West Germany	4.40	Q
	Karl-Gustav Burlin	Sweden	4.40	Q
	Renato Dionisi	Italy	4.40	Q
	Igor Feld	Soviet Union	4.40	Q
	Włodzimierz Sokołowski	Poland	4.40	Q
	Altti Alarotu	Finland	4.40	Q
	Waldemar Węcek	Poland	4.40	Q
	Jean-Pierre Colusso	France	4.40	Q
	Mike Bull	Great Britain	4.40	Q
	Rudolf Tomášek	Czechoslovakia	4.40	Q
	Claus Schiprowski	West Germany	4.40	Q
	Maurice Houvion	France	4.20	
	Paul Coppejans	Belgium	4.20	
	Dimitar Khlebarov	Bulgaria	4.20	
	Pavel Jindra	Czechoslovakia	4.20	
	František Taftl	Czechoslovakia	NH	
	Aldo Righi	Italy	NH	
	Risto Ivanoff	Finland	NH	
	Hans Lagerqvist	Sweden	NH	
	Tapio Mertanen	Sweden	NH	
	Hennadiy Bleznitsov	Soviet Union	NH	
	János Miskei	Hungary	NH	

== Participation ==
According to an unofficial count, 27 athletes from 15 countries participated in the event.

- Belgium (1)
- Bulgaria (1)
- Czechoslovakia (3)
- East Germany (1)
- Finland (2)
- France (3)
- Greece (1)
- Hungary (1)
- Italy (2)
- Poland (3)
- Soviet Union (2)
- Spain (1)
- Sweden (3)
- Great Britain (1)
- West Germany (2)
