= 1967 European Indoor Games – Men's pole vault =

The men's pole vault event at the 1967 European Indoor Games was held on 12 March in Prague.

== Results ==
Rank	Name	Nationality	4.20	4.40	4.60	4.70	4.80	4.90	5.00	5.10	Result	Notes
1st place, gold medalist(s)	Igor Feld	Soviet Union	–	o	o	–	o	o	o	xxx	5.00	
2nd place, silver medalist(s)	Hennadiy Bleznitsov	Soviet Union	–	–	o	–	xo	o	xxx		4.90	
3rd place, bronze medalist(s)	Wolfgang Nordwig	East Germany	–	–	xo	–	o	xxo	xxx		4.90	
4	Altti Alarotu	Finland	–	o	o	o	o	xxx			4.80	
5	Heinfried Engel	West Germany	–	o	xo	o	o	xxx			4.80	
6	Reiner Liese	West Germany	–	o	o	–	xo	xxx			4.80	
7	Auvo Pehkoranta	Finland	–	o	o	xo	xo	xxx			4.80	
8	Włodzimierz Sokołowski	Poland	–	o	o	–	xxo	xxx			4.80	
9	Rudolf Tomášek	Czechoslovakia									4.70	
10	Waldemar Węcek	Poland									4.70	
11	Ignacio Sola	Spain									4.60	
12	Mike Bull	Great Britain									4.60	
13	Pavel Jindra	Czechoslovakia									4.60	
14	Werner Duttweiler	Switzerland									4.40	
