= 1968 European Indoor Games – Men's pole vault =

The men's pole vault event at the 1968 European Indoor Games was held on 10 March in Madrid.

== Results ==
Rank	Name	Nationality	Result	Notes
1st place, gold medalist(s)	Wolfgang Nordwig	East Germany	5.20	
2nd place, silver medalist(s)	Hennadiy Bleznitsov	Soviet Union	5.10	
3rd place, bronze medalist(s)	Jörge Milack	East Germany	5.00	
4	Renato Dionisi	Italy	5.00	
5	Ignacio Sola	Spain	5.00	
6	Kjell Isaksson	Sweden	4.90	
7	Leszek Butscher	Poland	4.80	
8	Mike Bull	Great Britain	4.80	
9	Włodzimierz Sokołowski	Poland	4.80	
10	Wolfgang Reinhardt	West Germany	4.70	
11	Jean-Pierre Colusso	France	4.70	
12	Werner Duttweiler	Switzerland	4.40	
13	Robert Anders	West Germany	4.40	
	Rudolf Tomášek	Czechoslovakia	NM	
