= 1969 European Indoor Games – Men's pole vault =

The men's pole vault event at the 1969 European Indoor Games was held on 9 March in Belgrade.

== Results ==
| Rank | Name | Nationality | Result | Notes |
|---|---|---|---|---|
| 1st place, gold medalist(s) | Wolfgang Nordwig | East Germany | 5.20 | =CR |
| 2nd place, silver medalist(s) | Hennadiy Bleznitsov | Soviet Union | 5.10 | |
| 3rd place, bronze medalist(s) | Joachim Bär | East Germany | 5.10 | |
| 4 | Yury Isakov | Soviet Union | 5.10 | |
| 5 | Renato Dionisi | Italy | 5.00 | |
| 6 | Kjell Isaksson | Sweden | 5.00 | |
| 7 | John-Erik Blomqvist | Sweden | 5.00 | |
| 8 | Dinu Piștalu | Romania | 4.90 | |
| 9 | Jan Odvarka | Czechoslovakia | 4.90 | |
| 10 | Mike Bull | Great Britain | 4.90 | |
| 11 | Heinfried Engel | West Germany | 4.80 | |
| | Claus Schiprowski | West Germany | DNS | |
