= 1970 European Athletics Indoor Championships – Men's pole vault =

The men's pole vault event at the 1970 European Athletics Indoor Championships was held on 15 March in Vienna.

== Results ==
Rank	Name	Nationality	Result	Notes
1st place, gold medalist(s)	François Tracanelli	France	5.30	
2nd place, silver medalist(s)	Kjell Isaksson	Sweden	5.25	
3rd place, bronze medalist(s)	Wolfgang Nordwig	East Germany	5.20	
4	Hristos Papanikolaou	Greece	5.00	
5	Heinfried Engel	West Germany	5.00	
6	Hennadiy Bleznitsov	Soviet Union	5.00	
7	Mike Bull	Great Britain	5.00	
8	Tadeusz Olszewski	Poland	4.90	
9	Agoston Schulek	Hungary	4.80	
10	Ignacio Sola	Spain	4.70	
11	Freddy Herbrand	Belgium	4.40	
12	Ömer Giraygil	Turkey	4.20	
	Aldo Righi	Italy	NM	
	Yuriy Khanafin	Soviet Union	NM	
