= Athletics at the 1965 Summer Universiade – Men's pole vault =

The men's pole vault event at the 1965 Summer Universiade was held at the People's Stadium in Budapest on 26 and 28 August 1965.

== Medalists ==
Gold	Silver	Bronze
John Pennel; United States	Hennadiy Bleznitsov; Soviet Union	Igor Feld; Soviet Union

== Results ==
=== Qualification ===
Rank	Group	Name	Nationality	Result	Notes
?	?	Igor Feld	Soviet Union	4.00	
?	?	Christos Papanikolaou	Greece	4.00	
?	?	Karl-Gustav Burlin	Sweden	4.00	
?	?	Daniel Borrey	Belgium	4.00	
?	?	Petre Astafei	Romania	4.00	
?	?	Yoshimasa Torii	Japan	4.00	
?	?	Hans Lagerqvist	Sweden	4.00	
?	?	Alain Moreaux	France	4.00	
?	?	John Pennel	United States	4.00	
?	?	Miguel Consegal	Spain	4.00	
?	?	Hennadiy Bleznitsov	Soviet Union	4.00	
?	?	Reiner Liese	West Germany	4.00	
?	?	Takeshi Kida	Japan	4.00	
?	?	Ágoston Schulek	Hungary	4.00	
?	?	Rudolf Tomášek	Czechoslovakia	4.00	
?	?	Jacques Cuvarov	France	4.00	
17	?	Włodzimierz Osiński	Poland	3.90	

=== Final ===
Rank	Name	Nationality	Result	Notes
1st place, gold medalist(s)	John Pennel	United States	5.00	UR
2nd place, silver medalist(s)	Hennadiy Bleznitsov	Soviet Union	4.90	
3rd place, bronze medalist(s)	Igor Feld	Soviet Union	4.80	
4	Yoshimasa Torii	Japan	4.80	
5	Takeshi Kida	Japan	4.80	
6	Christos Papanikolaou	Greece	4.80	
7	Rudolf Tomášek	Czechoslovakia	4.70	
8	Hans Lagerqvist	Sweden	4.60	
9	Ágoston Schulek	Hungary	4.50	
10	Petre Astafei	Romania	4.40	
11	Karl-Gustav Burlin	Sweden	4.40	
12	Daniel Borrey	Belgium	4.40	
13	Miguel Consegal	Spain	4.30	
14	Reiner Liese	West Germany	4.20	
15	Jacques Cuvarov	France	4.20	
16	Alain Moreaux	France	4.20	
