= 1971 European Athletics Championships – Men's pole vault =

Men's pole vault at the European Athletics Championships

The men's pole vault at the 1971 European Athletics Championships was held in Helsinki, Finland, at Helsinki Olympic Stadium on 11 and 13 August 1971.

== Medalists ==
Gold	Wolfgang Nordwig; East Germany
Silver	Kjell Isaksson; Sweden
Bronze	Renato Dionisi; Italy

== Results ==
=== Final ===
13 August

Rank	Name	Nationality	Result	Notes
1st place, gold medalist(s)	Wolfgang Nordwig	East Germany	5.35	CR
2nd place, silver medalist(s)	Kjell Isaksson	Sweden	5.30	
3rd place, bronze medalist(s)	Renato Dionisi	Italy	5.30	
4	Hans Lagerqvist	Sweden	5.25	
5	Włodzimierz Sokołowski	Poland	5.10	
6	John-Erik Blomqvist	Sweden	5.10	
7	Yuriy Isakov	Soviet Union	5.10	
8	Heinfried Engel	West Germany	5.10	
9	Antti Kalliomäki	Finland	5.00	
10	Altti Alarotu	Finland	4.90	
11	Hans-Jürgen Ziegler	West Germany	4.90	
12	Risto Ivanoff	Finland	4.90	

=== Qualification ===
11 August

Rank	Name	Nationality	Result	Notes
	Renato Dionisi	Italy	5.00	Q
	Wolfgang Nordwig	East Germany	5.00	Q
	Włodzimierz Sokołowski	Poland	5.00	Q
	Heinfried Engel	West Germany	5.00	Q
	Hans-Jürgen Ziegler	West Germany	5.00	Q
	Risto Ivanoff	Finland	5.00	Q
	Hans Lagerqvist	Sweden	5.00	Q
	Kjell Isaksson	Sweden	5.00	Q
	Antti Kalliomäki	Finland	5.00	Q
	Altti Alarotu	Finland	5.00	Q
	John-Erik Blomqvist	Sweden	5.00	Q
	Yuriy Isakov	Soviet Union	5.00	Q
	Wojciech Buciarski	Poland	4.90	
	Jean-Michel Bellot	France	4.90	
	Yevgeniy Tananyka	Soviet Union	4.90	
	Serge Lefebvre	France	4.70	
	Aldo Righi	Italy	4.60	
	Mike Bull	Great Britain	NH	
	François Tracanelli	France	NH	
	Christos Papanikolaou	Greece	NH	

== Participation ==
According to an unofficial count, 20 athletes from 10 countries participated in the event.

- East Germany (1)
- Finland (3)
- France (3)
- Greece (1)
- Italy (2)
- Poland (2)
- Soviet Union (2)
- Sweden (3)
- Great Britain (1)
- West Germany (2)
