= Athletics at the 1964 Summer Olympics – Men's pole vault =

Men's pole vault at the Games of the XVIII Olympiad
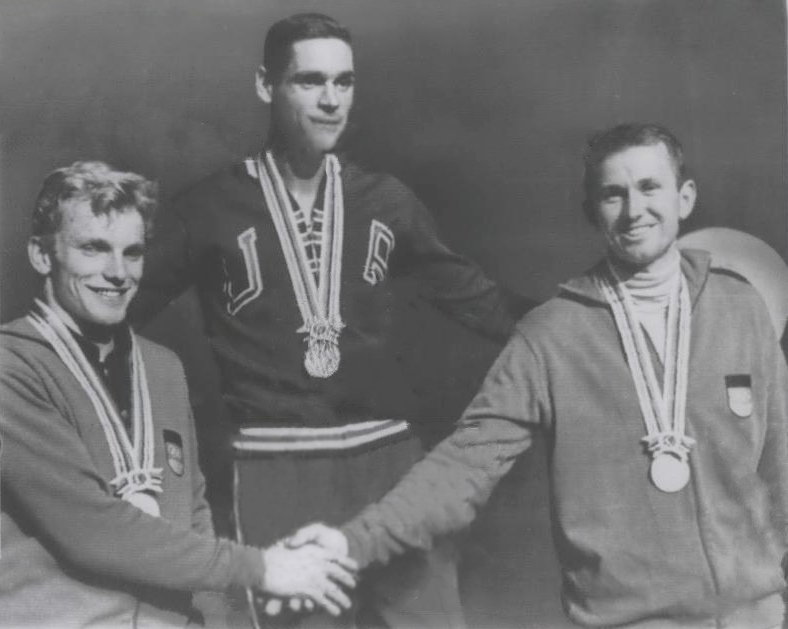
- Left-right: Reinhardt, Hansen, Lehnertz
- Venue: Olympic Stadium
- Dates: 15–17 October 1964
- Competitors: 30 from 19 nations
- Winning height: 5.10 OR

Medalists
1st place, gold medalist(s)		Fred Hansen; United States
2nd place, silver medalist(s)		Wolfgang Reinhardt; United Team of Germany
3rd place, bronze medalist(s)		Klaus Lehnertz; United Team of Germany

Official Video Highlights @29:48 Video on YouTube

The men's pole vault was one of four men's jumping events on the Athletics at the 1964 Summer Olympics program in Tokyo. Qualification was held on 15 October 1964, with the final on 17 October. 32 athletes from 20 nations entered, with 2 not starting in the qualification round. The final lasted over seven hours, to date the longest competition in history. All finalists qualified at 4.60, however in the final five were unable to achieve the height again.

At the time, the United States had never lost an Olympic pole vault competition. In the final, the last remaining American was Fred Hansen, who at the time was also the world record holder. Hansen cleared 5 meters on his first attempt, but so did three German athletes, making it a four-way tie. Hansen passed the next height, watching as only Wolfgang Reinhardt was able to clear. Re-entering the competition at 5.10, Hansen failed his first two attempts, but so did Reinhardt. Hansen then sailed over his final attempt, while Reinhart could not. Hansen continued the American streak, which would survive through one more Olympics until the 1972 pole vault controversy, when defending champion Bob Seagren had his pole confiscated at the games and had to compete on an unfamiliar, borrowed pole. Reinhardt's silver and Klaus Lehnertz's bronze were the first medals by German vaulters.

== Background ==
This was the 15th appearance of the event, which is one of 12 athletics events to have been held at every Summer Olympics. The returning finalists from the 1960 Games were fourth-place finisher Rolando Cruz of Puerto Rico, eighth-place finisher Rudolf Tomášek of Czechoslovakia, and eleventh-place finisher Dimitar Khlebarov of Bulgaria. This was the first Games to feature fiberglass poles, which had been used to break the world record 15 times since 1961. The last six were by three Americans: Brian Sternberg, John Pennel, and Fred Hansen. Sternberg had broken his neck practicing trampolining in 1963 and Pennel had suffered a (far less severe) back injury shortly before the Games, so Hansen was the favorite (though Pennel was able to compete).

For only the second time in Olympic pole vault history (1932), no nations made their debut in the event. The United States made its 15th appearance, the only nation to have competed at every Olympic men's pole vault to that point.

== Competition format ==
The competition used the two-round format introduced in 1912, with results cleared between rounds. Vaulters received three attempts at each height. Ties were broken by the countback rule. At the time, total attempts was used after total misses.

In the qualifying round, the bar was set at 4.20 metres, 4.30 metres, 4.40 metres, 4.55 metres (which every vaulter passed on), and 4.60 metres. All vaulters clearing 4.60 metres advanced to the final. If fewer than 12 cleared that height, the top 12 (including ties) advanced.

In the final, the bar was set at 4.40 metres, 4.60 metres, 4.70 metres, 4.80 metres, and then increased by 5 centimetres at a time.

== Records ==
Prior to this competition, the existing world and Olympic records were as follows.

World record	Fred Hansen (USA)	5.28	Los Angeles, United States	25 July 1964
Olympic record	Don Bragg (USA)	4.70	Rome, Italy	7 September 1960

The qualifying height for the final was only 10 centimetres under the old Olympic record; the introduction of fibreglass poles had made marks set before 1961 trivial for top vaulters. Thirteen men tied the old record, nine broke it, and Fred Hansen finished with a new record fully 40 centimetres above the old one.

== Schedule ==
All times are Japan Standard Time (UTC+9)

Date	Time	Round
Thursday, 15 October 1964	13:00	Qualifying
Saturday, 17 October 1964	13:00	Final

== Results ==
Key

- o = Height cleared
- x = Height failed
- – = Height passed
- r = Retired
- SB = Season's best
- PB = Personal best
- NR = National record
- AR = Area record
- OR = Olympic record
- WR = World record
- WL = World lead
- NM = No mark
- DNS = Did not start
- DQ = Disqualified

=== Qualifying ===
Vaulters had to clear 4.60 metres to qualify for the final. The bar started at 4.20 metres, increasing gradually to 4.60 metres. Each jumper had three attempts at each height or could skip any lower height (but could not return to a lower height if he determined that he could not succeed).

Rank	Athlete	Nation	4.20	4.30	4.40	4.50	4.60	Height	Notes
1	Hennadiy Bleznitsov	Soviet Union	—	—	—	—	o	4.60	Q
1	Fred Hansen	United States	—	—	—	—	o	4.60	Q
1	Billy Gene Pemelton	United States	—	—	—	—	o	4.60	Q
4	Risto Ankio	Finland	—	—	o	—	o	4.60	Q
4	Igor Feld	Soviet Union	—	—	o	—	o	4.60	Q
4	Roman Lešek	Yugoslavia	—	—	o	—	o	4.60	Q
4	Pentti Nikula	Finland	—	—	o	—	o	4.60	Q
4	Wolfgang Reinhardt	United Team of Germany	—	—	o	—	o	4.60	Q
4	Rudolf Tomášek	Czechoslovakia	—	—	—	o	o	4.60	Q
10	Herve D'Encausse	France	o	—	o	—	o	4.60	Q
10	Yang Chuan-kwang	Taiwan	—	—	o	o	o	4.60	Q
12	Sergey Dyomin	Soviet Union	—	—	xo	—	o	4.60	Q
13	Klaus Lehnertz	United Team of Germany	—	o	—	xo	o	4.60	Q
14	Manfred Preussger	United Team of Germany	—	—	xxo	—	o	4.60	Q
16	Gerry Moro	Canada	xo	—	xo	—	o	4.60	Q
16	Christos Papanikolau	Greece	—	xo	—	xo	o	4.60	Q
17	John Pennel	United States	—	—	—	—	xo	4.60	Q
18	Taisto Laitinen	Finland	—	—	o	—	xo	4.60	Q
19	Ignacio Sola	Spain	o	—	o	o	xxo	4.60	Q
20	Dave Stevenson	Great Britain	o	—	o	o	xxx	4.50	
21	Rolando Cruz	Puerto Rico	—	o	xxo	o	xxx	4.50	
22	Hisao Morita	Japan	—	—	o	—	xxx	4.40	
23	Werner Duttweiler	Switzerland	o	—	o	—	xxx	4.40	
24	Yoshimasa Torii	Japan	o	—	xo	—	xxx	4.40	
25	Renato Dionisi	Italy	o	xxx	—N/a			4.20	
25	Masashi Otsubo	Japan	o	—	xxx	—N/a		4.20	
27	Paul Coppejans	Belgium	o	—	xxx	—N/a		4.20	
—	Dimitar Khlebarov	Bulgaria	—	—	xxx	—N/a		No mark	
—	Włodzimierz Sokołowski	Poland	—	—	xxx	—N/a		No mark	
—	Maurice Houvion	France	xxx	—N/a				No mark	
—	Valbjörn Þorláksson	Iceland	DNS						
—	Wu Ar Min	Taiwan	DNS						

=== Final ===
Rank	Athlete	Nation	4.40	4.60	4.70	4.80	4.85	4.90	4.95	5.00	5.05	5.10	Height	Notes
1st place, gold medalist(s)	Fred Hansen	United States	—	—	o	o	o	—	—	o	—	xxo	5.10	OR
2nd place, silver medalist(s)	Wolfgang Reinhardt	United Team of Germany	xo	xo	—	xo	—	xo	—	o	o	xxx	5.05	
3rd place, bronze medalist(s)	Klaus Lehnertz	United Team of Germany	o	o	o	o	o	o	xo	o	xxx	—N/a	5.00	
4	Manfred Preussger	United Team of Germany	—	xxo	—	o	—	o	—	o	xxx	—N/a	5.00	
5	Hennadiy Bleznitsov	Soviet Union	o	o	o	—	o	—	o	xxx	—N/a		4.95	
6	Rudolf Tomášek	Czechoslovakia	—	o	o	xo	—	o	—	xxx	—N/a		4.90	
7	Pentti Nikula	Finland	xo	xo	o	xxo	xo	o	xxx	—N/a			4.90	
8	Billy Gene Pemelton	United States	—	—	o	o	xxx	—N/a					4.80	
9	Igor Feld	Soviet Union	—	o	xxo	xo	—	xxx	—N/a				4.80	
10	Gerry Moro	Canada	—	o	xo	o	xxx	—N/a					4.70	
11	John Pennel	United States	—	—	xo	—	xxx	—N/a					4.70	
12	Risto Ankio	Finland	—	o	xo	xxx	—N/a						4.70	
13	Roman Lesek	Yugoslavia	o	xxo	xo	xxx	—N/a						4.70	
14	Taisto Laitinen	Finland	o	o	xxx	—N/a							4.60	
15	Sergey Demin	Soviet Union	o	xxx	—N/a								4.40	
15	Herve D'Encausse	France	o	xxx	—N/a								4.40	
15	Ignacio Sola	Spain	o	xxx	—N/a								4.40	
18	Christos Papanikolau	Greece	xo	xxx	—N/a								4.40	
—	Yang Chuan-kwang	Taiwan	xxx	—N/a									No mark	
