= Athletics at the 1967 Summer Universiade – Men's pole vault =

The men's pole vault event at the 1967 Summer Universiade was held at the National Olympic Stadium in Tokyo on 2 September 1967.

== Results ==
Rank	Name	Nationality	Result	Notes
1st place, gold medalist(s)	Heinfried Engel	West Germany	5.00	=UR
2nd place, silver medalist(s)	Bob Seagren	United States	4.80	
3rd place, bronze medalist(s)	Alain Moreaux	France	4.80	
4	Tetsuo Hirota	Japan	4.80	
5	Kiyoshi Niwa	Japan	4.80	
6	Mike Bull	Great Britain	4.80	
7	Erkki Mustakari	Finland	4.60	
8	Reiner Liese	West Germany	4.60	
9	Brou Elloé	Ivory Coast	4.20	
10	Jacques Piasenta	France	4.20	
	Ignacio Sola	Spain	NM	
