= Athletics at the 1970 Summer Universiade – Men's pole vault =

Bad boy vijay

The men's pole vault event at the 1970 Summer Universiade was held at the Stadio Comunale in Turin on 3 September 1970.

== Records ==
Standing records prior to the 1970 Summer Universiade
World record	Wolfgang Nordwig (GDR)	5.45	East Berlin, East Germany	17 June 1970
Universiade record	Heinfried Engel (FRG)	5.00	Tokyo, Japan	1967

== Results ==
Rank	Athlete	Nationality	4.60	4.80	5.00	5.20	5.30	5.42	5.46	5.50	Result	Notes
1st place, gold medalist(s)	Wolfgang Nordwig	East Germany	–	–	o	o	o	o	xxo	xxx	5.46	WR
2nd place, silver medalist(s)	Christos Papanikolau	Greece						o	xxx		5.42	NR
3rd place, bronze medalist(s)	François Tracanelli	France					o	x–	xx		5.30	
4	Heinfried Engel	West Germany									5.20	
5	Kyoichiro Inoue	Japan									5.00	
6	Mike Bull	Great Britain									5.00	
7	Yury Isakov	Soviet Union									4.80	
8	Zygmunt Dobrosz	Poland									4.80	
9	Vittorio Gian Pontonutti	Italy									4.60	
10	Reinhard Kuretzky	West Germany									4.60	
11	Allen Kane	Canada									4.60	
12	Jeff Sakala	United States									4.60	
	Jean-Prosper Tsondzabéka	Republic of the Congo									NM	
	Robert Liotard	France									NM	
	Kiyoshi Niwa	Japan									NM	
