= Ōtsubo =

Ōtsubo, Otsubo or Ootsubo (written: 大坪) is a Japanese surname. Notable people with the surname include:

- Fumio Ōtsubo (大坪 文雄, born 1945), Japanese chief executive
- Hirokazu Otsubo (大坪 博和, born 1979), Japanese footballer
- Masashi Otsubo (大坪 政士, born 1938), Japanese pole vaulter
- Takanobu Otsubo (大坪 隆誠, born 1976), Japanese long-distance runner
- Toshimitsu Otsubo (大坪 利満, born 1945), Japanese ice hockey player
- Yuka Ōtsubo (大坪 由佳, born 1993), Japanese voice actress
