= 1969 European Athletics Championships – Men's pole vault =

Men's pole vault at the European Athletics Championships

The men's pole vault at the 1969 European Athletics Championships was held in Athens, Greece, at Georgios Karaiskakis Stadium on 19 and 20 September 1969.

== Medalists ==
Gold	Wolfgang Nordwig; East Germany
Silver	Kjell Isaksson; Sweden
Bronze	Aldo Righi; Italy

== Results ==
=== Final ===
20 September

Rank	Name	Nationality	Result	Notes
1st place, gold medalist(s)	Wolfgang Nordwig	East Germany	5.30	CR
2nd place, silver medalist(s)	Kjell Isaksson	Sweden	5.20	
3rd place, bronze medalist(s)	Aldo Righi	Italy	5.10	
4	Christos Papanikolaou	Greece	5.00	
5	John-Erik Blomqvist	Sweden	5.00	
6	Joachim Bär	East Germany	5.00	
7	Mike Bull	Great Britain	5.00	
8	Erkki Mustakari	Finland	4.90	
9	Alain-Pierre Legrain	France	4.80	
10	Risto Ivanoff	Finland	4.70	
11	Gianfranco Mariani	Italy	4.70	
	Yuriy Isakov	Soviet Union	NH	

=== Qualification ===
19 September

Rank	Name	Nationality	Result	Notes
	John-Erik Blomqvist	Sweden	4.80	Q
	Christos Papanikolaou	Greece	4.80	Q
	Gianfranco Mariani	Italy	4.80	Q
	Joachim Bär	East Germany	4.80	Q
	Alain-Pierre Legrain	France	4.80	Q
	Wolfgang Nordwig	East Germany	4.80	Q
	Risto Ivanoff	Finland	4.80	Q
	Aldo Righi	Italy	4.80	Q
	Yuriy Isakov	Soviet Union	4.70	Q
	Mike Bull	Great Britain	4.70	Q
	Kjell Isaksson	Sweden	4.70	Q
	Erkki Mustakari	Finland	4.70	Q
	Robert Steinhacker	Hungary	4.50	
	François Tracanelli	France	NH	
	Renato Dionisi	Italy	NH	

== Participation ==
According to an unofficial count, 15 athletes from 9 countries participated in the event.

- East Germany (2)
- Finland (2)
- France (2)
- Greece (1)
- Hungary (1)
- Italy (3)
- Soviet Union (1)
- Sweden (2)
- Great Britain (1)
