= Masters M40 pole vault world record progression =

This is the progression of world record improvements of the pole vault M40 division of Masters athletics.

Key

Incomplete information Pending

Height	Athlete	Nationality	Birthdate	Age	Location	Date	Ref
5.71 m i	Jeff Hartwig	United States	25 September 1967	40 years, 249 days	Jonesboro	31 May 2008	
5.70 m	Jeff Hartwig	United States	25 September 1967	40 years, 278 days	Eugene	29 June 2008	
5.50 m	Larry Jessee	United States	31 March 1952	44 years, 146 days	El Paso	24 August 1996	
5.21 m	Kjell Isaksson	Sweden	28 February 1948	41 years, 115 days	Ljusdal	23 June 1989	
4.80 m	János Veisz	Hungary	21 September 1947	40 years, 124 days	Budapest	23 January 1988	
4.80 m	Bodgan Markowski	Poland	14 April 1946	40 years, 19 days	Flein	3 May 1986	
4.80 m	Rudolf Tomášek	Czech Republic	11 August 1937	40 years, 2 days	Kladno	13 August 1977	
4.80 m	Maurice Houvion	France	4 July 1934	41 years, 330 days		29 May 1976	
