= Houvion =

Houvion is a surname. Notable people with the surname include:

- Maurice Houvion (born 1934), French pole vaulter and coach
- Philippe Houvion (born 1957), French pole vaulter
