= Masters M35 pole vault world record progression =

This is the progression of world record improvements of the pole vault M35 division of Masters athletics.

Key

Incomplete information Pending

Height	Athlete	Nationality	Birthdate	Location	Date	Ref
5.91 m i	Renaud Lavillenie	France	18 September 1986	Clermont-Ferrand	28 February 2025	
5.90 m	Bjorn Otto	Germany	16 August 1977	Eugene	1 June 2013	
5.88 m i	Jeff Hartwig	United States	25 September 1967	Jonesboro	22 February 2004	
5.85 m	Tim Bright	United States	28 July 1960	Monmouth	8 June 1996	
5.85 m	Derek Miles	United States	28 September 1972	Berlin	8 September 2008	
5.66 m	Mike Tully	United States	21 October 1956	San Diego	13 June 1992	
5.65 m	Earl Bell	United States	25 August 1955	Jonesboro	19 May 1991	
5.62 m	Tadeusz Ślusarski	Poland	19 May 1950	Recklinghausen	8 June 1985	
5.50 m	Antti Kalliomäki	Finland	8 January 1947	Raahe	4 July 1982	
5.30 m	Christos Papanikolau	Greece	25 January 1941	Ankara	9 September 1977	
5.15 m	Hans Lagerqvist	Sweden	28 April 1940	Stockholm	18 June 1975	
5.00 m	Maurice Houvion	France	4 July 1934	Auch	12 September 1971	
4.57 m	Ron Morris	United States	27 April 1935	Los Angeles	20 June 1971	
