= Masters M45 pole vault world record progression =

This is the progression of world record improvements of the pole vault M45 division of Masters athletics.

Key

Incomplete information Pending Indoor mark
IAAF includes indoor marks in the record list since 2000, but WMA does not follow that practice.

| Height | Athlete | Nationality | Birthdate | Age | Location | Date | Ref |
|---|---|---|---|---|---|---|---|
| 5.25 m | Oscar Janson | Sweden | 22 July 1975 | 47 years, 22 days | Mölndal | 13 August 2022 | |
| 5.14 m i | Paul Babits | United States | 24 December 1960 | 47 years, 62 days | Fort Wayne | 24 February 2008 | |
| 5.10 m | Larry Jessee | United States | 31 March 1952 | 45 years, 163 days | El Paso | 10 September 1997 | |
| 4.80 m | Steve Hardison | United States | 15 July 1950 | 46 years, 263 days | Fresno | 4 April 1997 | |
| 4.73 m | Jerry Cash | United States | 21 November 1948 | 46 years, 256 days | Eugene | 4 August 1995 | |
| 4.71 m A | Gregg Miguel | United States | 18 February 1947 | 46 years, 174 days | Provo | 11 August 1993 | |
| 4.70 m | Ingo Peyker | Austria | 8 September 1941 | 48 years, 301 days | Budapest | 6 July 1990 | |
| 4.70 m | Maurice Houvion | France | 4 July 1934 | 45 years, 283 days | | 12 April 1980 | |
| 4.57 m | Roger Ruth | Canada | 23 December 1927 | 45 years, 210 days | Seattle | 21 July 1973 | |
