= Heinz Wyss =

Swiss pole vaulter (born 1945)

Personal information
- Nationality: Swiss
- Born: 10 December 1945 (age 80)

Sport
- Sport: Athletics
- Event: Pole vault

Heinz Wyss (born 10 December 1945) is a Swiss athlete. He competed in the men's pole vault at the 1968 Summer Olympics.
