= Aleksandr Malyutin =

Soviet pole vaulter

Personal information
- Nationality: Soviet
- Born: 13 June 1939 (age 87)

Sport
- Sport: Athletics
- Event: Pole vault

Aleksandr Malyutin (born 13 June 1939) is a Soviet athlete. He competed in the men's pole vault at the 1968 Summer Olympics.
