= Pantelis Nikolaidis =

Greek pole vaulter

Personal information
- Nationality: Greek
- Born: 28 February 1942
- Died: 28 October 1979 (aged 37) Yugoslavia

Sport
- Sport: Athletics
- Event: Pole vault

Pantelis Nikolaidis (28 February 1942 - 28 October 1979) was a Greek athlete. He competed in the men's pole vault at the 1968 Summer Olympics.
