= Masters M55 pole vault world record progression =

This is the progression of world record improvements of the pole vault M55 division of Masters athletics.

Key

Incomplete information Pending

Height	Athlete	Nationality	Birthdate	Age	Location	Date	Ref
4.60 m	Wolfgang Ritte	Germany	7 January 1953	55 years, 153 days	Voerde	8 June 2008	
4.26 m	Hans Lagerqvist	Sweden	28 April 1940	56 years, 118 days	Visby	24 August 1996	
4.12 m	Richmond "Boo" Morcom	United States	1 May 1921	55 years, 95 days	Hampton	4 August 1976	
3.90 m	Herbert Schmidt	Germany	11 January 1910	56 years, 105 days	Duisburg	26 April 1966	
