= Sergey Dyomin =

Soviet pole vaulter

Personal information
- Nationality: Soviet
- Born: 18 December 1943 (age 82)

Sport
- Sport: Athletics
- Event: Pole vault

Sergey Dyomin (born 18 December 1943) is a Soviet athlete. He competed in the men's pole vault at the 1964 Summer Olympics.
