= Flying Finn =

Nickname given to Finnish athletes

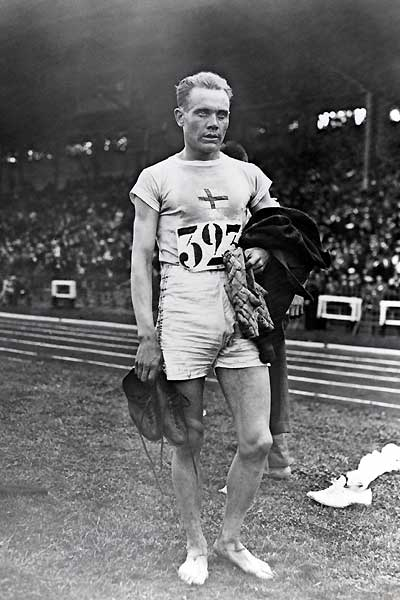
Paavo Nurmi at the 1924 Olympics

"The Flying Finn" (Finnish: Lentävä suomalainen, Swedish: Flygande finländaren) is a nickname given to several Finnish athletes who were noted for their speed. It was given to several Finnish middle- and long-distance runners. The term also refers to notable Finnish racing drivers.

Flying Finn is also the title of a documentary about the history of sports in Finland, and is the first English-language documentary produced in Finland.

== Athletics ==
The nickname was first used of Hannes Kolehmainen, also known as "Smiling Hannes." He took home three gold medals and broke two world records during the 1912 Summer Olympics in Stockholm. As Finnish runners started to dominate long-distance running, the nickname was passed on to all successful Finns in the sport, including multi-Olympic gold medalists Paavo Nurmi and Ville Ritola. Nurmi won three gold medals at the 1920 Summer Olympics in Belgium and five at the 1924 Summer Olympics in Paris, where he was partnered with Ritola, who ran to four gold medals. Volmari Iso-Hollo, the winner of 3000 m steeplechase at the 1932 and 1936 Summer Olympics, was one of the best-known Finnish runners in the 1930s and also nicknamed the Flying Finn. During his tour of the United States in 1940, Taisto Mäki—who held five world records—was regularly referred to as a Flying Finn. The last Flying Finn in running was Lasse Virén, who won the 5000 m and 10,000 m events at the 1972 and 1976 Summer Olympics.

The name was also used to refer to Altti Alarotu, a pole vault competitor in the 1960s.

== Motorsport ==
=== Rallying ===
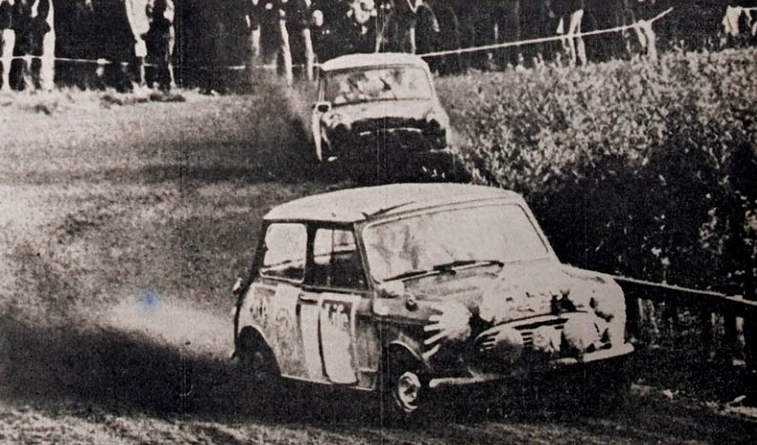
Timo Mäkinen and Rauno Aaltonen at the 1965 1000 Lakes Rally

The nickname was next used to describe the efforts of Finnish rally drivers in the 1960s. Timo Mäkinen, Rauno Aaltonen and Simo Lampinen were among the first drivers referenced as the Flying Finn. In 1968, Castrol released a film called "The Flying Finns", it featured the 1968 1000 Lakes Rally and concentrated on documenting the duel between Mäkinen and Hannu Mikkola. The term then moved on to the next generations of Finnish rally drivers, and among others, the four-time World Rally Champions Juha Kankkunen and Tommi Mäkinen were often referred to as Flying Finns.

=== Formula One ===
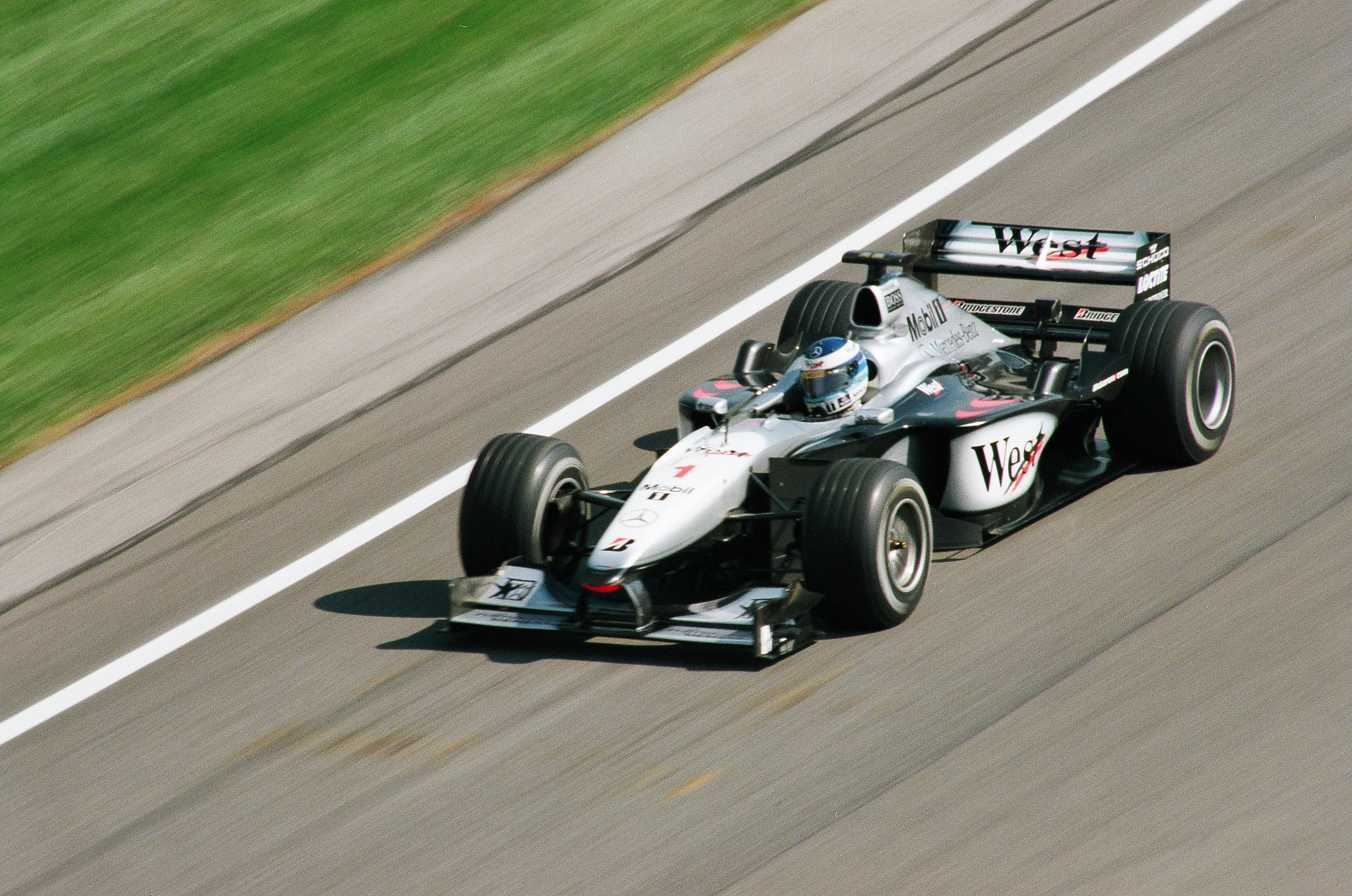
Mika Häkkinen at the 2000 United States Grand Prix

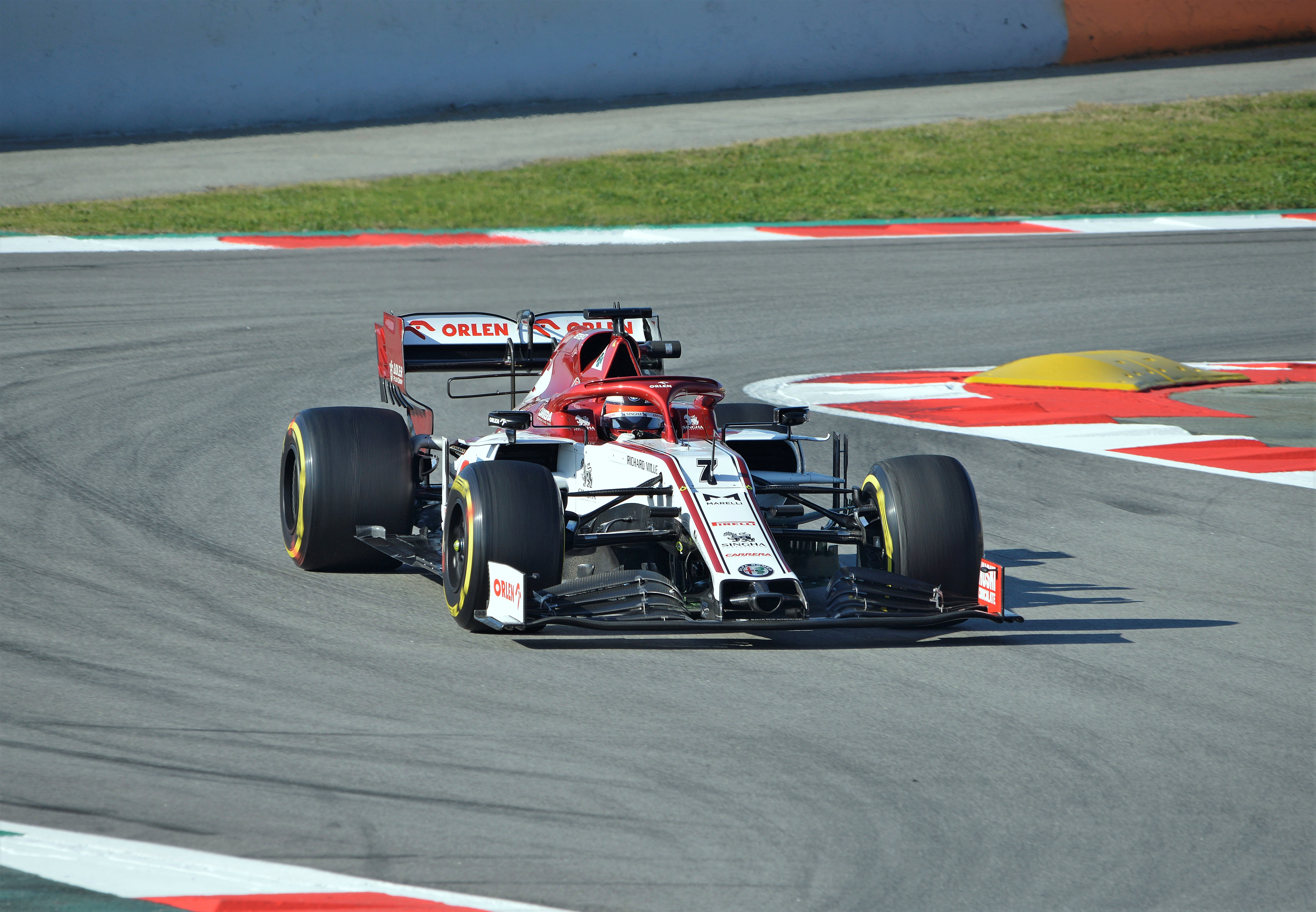
Kimi Räikkönen driving an Alfa Romeo Formula One car in 2020

The first driver to carry the nickname in Formula One was Leo Kinnunen. Kinnunen had the title written on his helmet in 1970, when he won the World Sportscar Championship for Porsche. However, he could not turn his success in sports car racing into a successful F1 career in his underpowered Surtees. In the 1980s the moniker was given to Keke Rosberg, who became the first well-known Finn in the sport, winning the 1982 world championship. Following the success of later Finnish drivers, Rosberg has been described as the "original Flying Finn".

After Rosberg, many Finnish Formula 1 drivers have also been called the "Flying Finn", including Mika Häkkinen, who won the drivers' championship in 1998 and 1999; Mika Salo; Kimi Räikkönen, who was drivers' champion in 2007; Heikki Kovalainen; and Valtteri Bottas.

=== Motorcycles ===
On two wheels, the most famous Flying Finn was Jarno Saarinen, also known as The Baron, who won the 250cc road racing World Championship as privateer in 1972, and finished a close second to Giacomo Agostini in the 350cc class. Saarinen died the following year, while leading both the 250cc and 500cc championships and after competing for only three years. He remains in motorcycle sport history books for developing a new riding style, which is still predominantly in use today; body hanging off the bike with knee near the ground. During the 1970s, Finnish rider Heikki Mikkola won four motocross world championships and also became known as the Flying Finn. Mika Kallio, who finished second in the 125cc championship in 2005 and 2006, has also been nicknamed the Flying Finn. Mauno Hermunen, who has finished third in 2010 and fourth in 2011 in the world supermoto series, has also been nicknamed the Flying Finn.

== Football ==
Shefki Kuqi, who played for Scottish side Hibernian F.C. was nicknamed the "Flying Finn", owing to a strange but popular goal celebration, throwing himself onto the ground, with his arms outstretched and landing on his chest.

== List of Flying Finns ==
=== Motorsport ===
- Timo Mäkinen – rally driver
- Rauno Aaltonen – rally driver
- Pauli Toivonen – rally driver
- Markku Alén – World Rally Champion
- Pentti Airikkala – rally driver
- Simo Lampinen – rally driver
- Kyösti Hämäläinen - rally driver
- Marcus Grönholm – two time World Rally Champion
- Mikko Hirvonen – rally driver
- Joonas Kylmäkorpi – four time world long track champion
- Jari-Matti Latvala – rally driver
- Tommi Mäkinen – four time World Rally Champion
- Heikki Mikkola – four-time motocross world champion
- Keke Rosberg – F1 World Champion
- Jarno Saarinen – Motorcycle World Champion
- Teuvo Länsivuori – Motorcycle road racer
- Juha Kankkunen – four time World Rally Champion
- JJ Lehto – two time Le Mans winner and F1 podium finisher
- Juha Salminen – twelve time World Enduro Champion
- Timo Salonen – World Rally Champion
- Mika Salo – two time Le Mans GT2 winner and F1 podium finisher
- Kari Tiainen – seven time World Enduro Champion
- Henri Toivonen – rally driver, son of fellow Flying Finn, Pauli Toivonen
- Ari Vatanen – World Rally Champion
- Sami Seliö – F1 Boat World Champion
- Mika Häkkinen – two time F1 World Champion
- Kimi Räikkönen – F1 World Champion and WRC driver
- Heikki Kovalainen – F1 race winner and Super GT champion
- Valtteri Bottas – F1 race winner
- Jere Rantaniemi – drag racing driver
- Kalle Rovanperä – World Rally Champion

=== Winter sports ===
- Janne Ahonen – ski jumper
- Jari Kurri – ice hockey player
- Matti Nykänen – ski jumper
- Kalle Palander – alpine skier
- Teemu Selänne – ice hockey player
- Kalevi Häkkinen – speed skier
- Kaisa Mäkäräinen – biathlete (won three World Cups)

=== Other Flying Finns ===
- Pertti Karppinen – triple Olympic rowing champion
- Jarkko Nieminen – tennis player known for his speed
- Makwan Amirkhani – MMA fighter known for his flying knee attack
- Juho Kuosmanen – Finnish film director and screenwriter
