= Hans Lagerqvist =

Swedish pole vaulter (1940–2019)

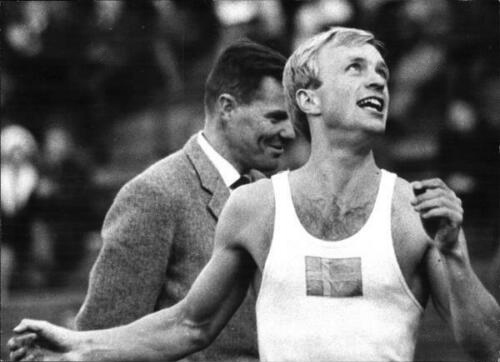
- Lagerqvist in 1966

Personal information
- Born: 28 April 1940 Gothenburg, Sweden
- Died: 22 July 2019 (aged 79)
- Height: 182 cm (6 ft 0 in)
- Weight: 73 kg (161 lb)

Sport
- Sport: Athletics
- Events: Pole vault, sprint, long jump
- Club: Duvbo IK

Achievements and titles
- Personal bests: 5.40i (1972); 100 m – 10.8; LJ – 7.07 m
Medal record
Representing Sweden
European Athletics Indoor Championships
Silver medal – second place	1972 Grenoble	Pole vault
World Masters Athletics Championships
Silver medal – second place	1981 Christchurch	Pole vault M40
Gold medal – first place	1987 Melbourne	Pole vault M45
Gold medal – first place	1991 Turku	Pole vault M50
Gold medal – first place	1993 Miyazaki	Pole vault M50
Gold medal – first place	1995 Buffalo	Pole vault M55
Gold medal – first place	1997 Durban	Pole vault M55
Gold medal – first place	1999 Gateshead	Pole vault M55
Gold medal – first place	2001 Brisbane	Pole vault M60
Gold medal – first place	2003 Carolina	Pole vault M60
Gold medal – first place	2004 Sindelfingen (indoors)	Pole vault M60
Gold medal – first place	2008 Clermont-Ferrand (indoors)	Pole vault M65
Gold medal – first place	2009 Lahti	Pole vault M65
Silver medal – second place	2010 Kamloops (indoors)	Pole vault M65
Silver medal – second place	2011 Sacramento	Pole vault M70
Bronze medal – third place	2015 Lyon	Pole vault M75

Hans Ture Lennart Lagerqvist (28 April 1940 – 22 July 2019) was a Swedish pole vaulter who won a silver medal at the 1972 European Athletics Indoor Championships. He cleared the same height of 5.40 m as the winner, Wolfgang Nordwig, but used more attempts. Lagerqvist placed fourth at the 1971 European Championships and seventh at the 1971 European Athletics Indoor Championships and 1972 Olympics. He won the national title in 1965 and 1972 and held several national records.

Lagerqvist set three masters world records: in the M35 (1975), M50 (1990) and M55 categories (1996). He won eleven world titles in 1981–2015.
