= Taisto Laitinen =

Finnish pole vaulter

Personal information
- Nationality: Finnish
- Born: 17 September 1933 Vyborg, Finland
- Died: 20 December 2022 (aged 89) Valkeakoski, Finland

Sport
- Sport: Athletics
- Event: Pole vault

Taisto Laitinen (17 September 1933 – 20 December 2022) was a Finnish athlete. He competed in the men's pole vault at the 1964 Summer Olympics.
