= Fred Hansen =

American athlete (born 1940)

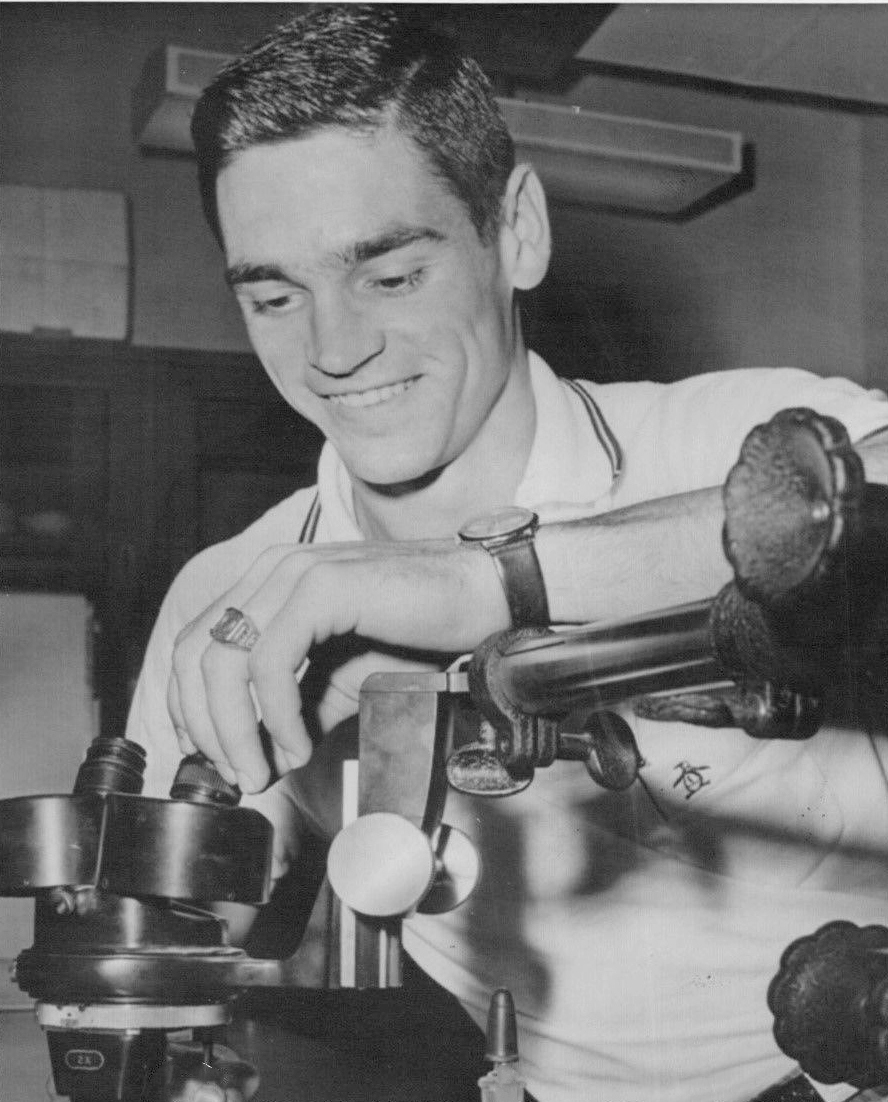
- Hansen in the 1960s

Personal information
- Full name: Frederick Morgan Hansen
- Born: December 29, 1940 (age 85) Cuero, Texas, U.S.
- Height: 183 cm (6 ft 0 in)
- Weight: 75 kg (165 lb)

Sport
- Sport: Athletics
- Events: Pole vault, long jump
- Club: Rice Owls, Houston

Achievements and titles
- Personal bests: PV – 5.28 m (1964); LJ – 7.26 m (1961)
Medal record
Men's athletics
Representing United States
Olympic Games
Gold medal – first place	1964 Tokyo	Pole vault

Official Olympic Highlights @29:48 Video on YouTube Pathe film of world record @1:07 Video on YouTube

Frederick Morgan Hansen (born December 29, 1940) is an American former athlete who competed mainly in the pole vault.

A 1963 graduate of Rice University, he competed in the pole vault for the United States in the 1964 Summer Olympics held in Tokyo, Japan, where he won the gold medal. He held the world record in the pole vault for almost 2 years, first set as 5.23 m (17 ft 1 3/4 in) on June 13, 1964, and then improved to 5.28 m (17 ft 3 3/4 in) on July 25, 1964, at the USA vs USSR dual meet at the Los Angeles Memorial Coliseum.

== 1964 Olympics ==
Going into the 1964 Olympics, the United States had never lost an Olympic pole vault competition. In the final, the last remaining American was Hansen, who at the time was also the world record holder. The field included two other previous world record holders and decathlete C. K. Yang. Hansen cleared 5 meters on his first attempt, but so did three German athletes. Hansen then passed the next height, watching as only Wolfgang Reinhardt was able to clear. Re-entering the competition at 5.10, Hansen failed his first two attempts, but so did Reinhardt. Hansen then sailed over his final attempt, while Reinhart could not. Hansen continued the American streak, which would survive through one more Olympics until the 1972 pole vault controversy, when defending champion Bob Seagren had his pole confiscated at the games and had to compete on an unfamiliar, borrowed pole.

Hansen is featured on the cover of the book The Pole Vault: A Violent Ballet by David Butler.

== Personal life ==
Hansen was an avid golfer, and played at the 1980 U.S. Amateur golf championship. He resides Gonzales County, Texas. He formerly practiced dentistry in Houston, Texas, in the Memorial area of town. He was Inducted into the Texas Track and Field Coaches Hall of Fame, Class of 2016.

Records
Preceded by (United States) John Pennel	Men's pole vault world record holder June 13, 1964 – May 14, 1966	Succeeded by (United States) Bob Seagren
