= Masashi Otsubo =

Japanese pole vaulter

Personal information
- Nationality: Japanese
- Born: 18 June 1938 (age 87)

Sport
- Sport: Athletics
- Event: Pole vault

Masashi Otsubo (大坪 政士, Ōtsubo Masashi; born 18 June 1938) is a Japanese track and field athlete. He competed in the men's pole vault at the 1964 Summer Olympics.
