= Toshimitsu Otsubo =

Japanese ice hockey player

Personal information
- Nationality: Japanese
- Born: 4 April 1945 (age 79); Hokkaido, Japan

Sport
- Sport: Ice hockey

Toshimitsu Otsubo (大坪 利満, Ōtsubo Toshimitsu, born 4 April 1945) is a Japanese ice hockey player. He competed in the men's tournaments at the 1968 Winter Olympics, the 1972 Winter Olympics and the 1976 Winter Olympics.
