= Masters M50 pole vault world record progression =

This is the progression of world record improvements of the pole vault M50 division of Masters athletics.

Key

Incomplete information Pending Better indoor record

Height	Athlete	Nationality	Birthdate	Age	Location	Date	Ref
4.90 m i	Jonas Asplund	Sweden	14 February 1973	53 years, 45 days	Toruń	31 March 2026	
4.76 m i	Jonas Asplund	Sweden	14 February 1973	51 years, 353 days	Sätra	1 February 2025	
4.90 m	Gary Hunter	United States	26 February 1956	51 years, 214 days	Fort Wayne	28 September 2007	
4.75 m	Gary Hunter	United States	26 February 1956	51 years, 159 days	Orono	4 August 2007	
4.73 m	Wolfgang Ritte	Germany	7 January 1953,	51 years, 130 days	Soest	16 May 2004	
4.57 m	Jerry Cash	United States	21 November 1948	51 years, 230 days	Eugene	8 July 2000	
4.54 m	Terry Porter	United States	21 May 1952	51 years, 331 days	Waco	16 April 2004	
4.53 m	Steve Hardison	United States	15 July 1950	50 years, 27 days	Eugene	11 August 2000	
4.50 m	Daniel Borrey	Belgium	12 August 1945	50 years, 21 days	Berkeley	2 September 1995	
4.40 m	Hans Lagerqvist	Sweden	28 April 1940	50 years, 68 days	Budapest	5 July 1990	
4.37 m	James "Vic" Cook	United States	22 February 1932	50 years, 153 days	Los Angeles	25 July 1982	
4.27 m	Richmond "Boo" Morcom	United States	1 May 1921	52 years, 191 days	Philadelphia	8 November 1973	
