= Klaus Lehnertz =

German pole vaulter (1938–2026)

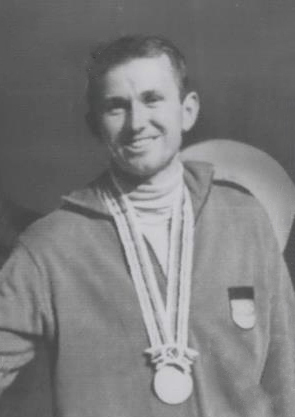
- Lehnertz at the 1964 Olympics

Personal information
- Born: 13 April 1938 Solingen, Gau Düsseldorf, Germany
- Died: 26 May 2026 (aged 88) Kassel, Hesse, Germany
- Height: 183 cm (6 ft 0 in)
- Weight: 75 kg (165 lb)

Sport
- Sport: Athletics
- Event: Pole vault

Achievements and titles
- Personal best: 5.10 m (1967)
Medal record
Representing Germany
Olympic Games
Bronze medal – third place	1964 Tokyo	Pole vault
Representing West Germany
European Cup
Silver medal – second place	1965 Stuttgart	Pole vault
Bronze medal – third place	1967 Kiev	Pole vault

Klaus Lehnertz (13 April 1938 – 26 May 2026) was a West German pole vaulter. He competed for the United Team of Germany at the 1964 Olympics and won a bronze medal. He also won two medals at the European Cup in 1965 and 1967 respectively, but placed only 13th and 9th at the European Championships in 1962 and 1966, respectively. Domestically he held West German outdoor (1959–61 and 1966–68) and indoor titles (1959, 1960 and 1964).

== Biography ==
Lehnertz was educated as a skiing teacher, and starting from 1973 taught at the University of Kassel. In 1985 he defended a habilitation, and until 2003 worked as a professor of kinesiology and athletics coach. He also carried out research studies on golf stroke mechanics.

For his Olympic achievement Lehnertz was awarded the Silbernes Lorbeerblatt in 1964 and the Rudolf-Harbig-Gedächtnispreis in 1967. In 1972 he was a member of the IAAF athletics jury.

Lehnertz died on 26 May 2026, at the age of 88.
