= Hirokazu Otsubo =

Japanese footballer and referee

Personal information
- Full name: Hirokazu Otsubo
- Date of birth: December 7, 1979 (age 46)
- Place of birth: Fukuoka, Japan
- Height: 1.74 m (5 ft 8 1/2 in)
- Position: Forward

Youth career
- 1995–1997: Mizuma High School

College career
Years	Team	Apps	(Gls)
1998–2001	Fukuyama University		

Senior career*
Years	Team	Apps	(Gls)
2002–2004	Otsuka Pharmaceutical	25	(9)
2005	Sagawa Express Osaka	26	(18)
2006	Ehime FC	15	(0)
2007–2010	Sagawa Printing	99	(20)
Total		165	(47)
- * Club domestic league appearances and goals

Hirokazu Otsubo (大坪 博和, Otsubo Hirokazu; born December 7, 1979) is a former Japanese football player who is currently a football referee.

== Club statistics ==
Club performance			League		Cup		Total	
Season	Club	League	Apps	Goals	Apps	Goals	Apps	Goals
Japan			League		Emperor's Cup		Total	
2002	Otsuka Pharmaceutical	Football League	10	3			10	3
2003	Otsuka Pharmaceutical	Football League	0	0			0	0
2004	Otsuka Pharmaceutical	Football League	15	6			15	6
2005	Sagawa Express Osaka	Football League	26	18	-		26	18
2006	Ehime FC	J2 League	15	0	2	1	17	1
2007	Sagawa Printing	Football League	34	9	2	1	36	10
2008	Sagawa Printing	Football League	28	8	3	2	31	10
2009	Sagawa Printing	Football League	20	0	1	0	21	0
2010	Sagawa Printing	Football League						
Total	Japan		148	46	8	4	156	50
Career total			148	46	8	4	156	50
