= Brian Sternberg =

American pole vaulter (1943–2013)

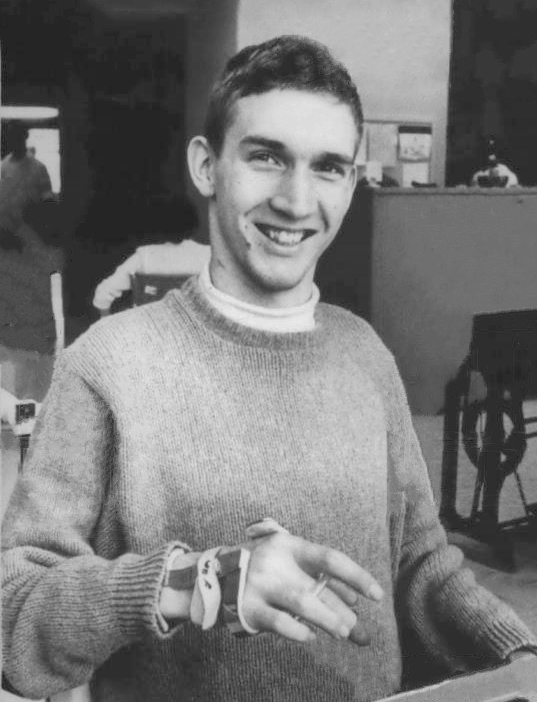
- Sternberg in 1964

Personal information
- Born: June 21, 1943
- Died: May 23, 2013 (aged 69)

Sport
- Sport: Athletics
- Event: Pole vault

Achievements and titles
- Personal best: 5.08 m (1963)

Brian Sternberg (June 21, 1943 – May 23, 2013) was a world record holder in the men's pole vault who was paralyzed from the neck down after a trampoline accident in 1963.

Sternberg set one of his world records on May 25, 1963, in Modesto, California jumping 16 feet 7 inches (5.05 m) using new technology for the sport, a fiberglass pole. His final record of 5.08 meters (16 ft 8 in) was set on June 7, 1963.

After graduation from Seattle's Shoreline High School in 1961, Sternberg enrolled at the University of Washington and won the 1963 NCAA pole vault title and also shattered the world record in the event twice.

Five weeks after his Modesto jump, Sternberg was training in Hec Edmundson Pavilion in preparation for a trip to Russia. While performing a double somersault with a half twist, he landed awkwardly on his neck in the middle of the trampoline where a spotter could not help. Sternberg had performed the gymnastic move, called a fliffus, hundreds of times. The injury left him a quadriplegic, and his doctors were concerned for his survival days after his accident.

In 1996, Sternberg underwent surgery, performed by Dr. Harry Goldsmith in Germany, to improve the quality of his life. The operation on his spinal cord allowed Sternberg to breathe deeper and easier, to speak more clearly and with greater volume. Sternberg was also able to remain upright for longer periods which improved his feeling of well-being.

Sternberg's unusually long life as a quadriplegic was credited, in part, to his athletic training and to a positive attitude.

"Brian was given a very poor prognosis," said his mother, Helen, in 2003. "They said with his condition, he probably would have five years to live. But he's a fighter."

In 2012, his heart and lungs began to fail. He died on May 23, 2013, aged 69.

Records
Preceded by (Finland) Pentti Nikula	Men's Pole Vault World Record Holder; April 27, 1963 – August 5, 1963	Succeeded by (United States) John Pennel
