= Yoshimasa Torii =

Japanese pole vaulter

Personal information
- Nationality: Japanese
- Born: 14 April 1942 (age 84)

Sport
- Sport: Athletics
- Event: Pole vault

Yoshimasa Torii (鳥居 義正, Torii Yoshimasa; born 14 April 1942) is a Japanese athlete. He competed in the men's pole vault at the 1964 Summer Olympics.
