= Maurice Houvion =

French pole vaulter (born 1934)

Maurice Houvion (born 4 July 1934 in Saulcy-sur-Meurthe, Vosges, France) is a French athlete known for the pole vault during the early transitional time of the fiberglass pole. He represented France at the 1964 Olympics. He was injured at the Olympics and was unable to clear a height. He would continue vaulting and coaching, eventually becoming national coach establishing the rich French tradition in the pole vault. His son Philippe Houvion briefly held the world record in the pole vault in 1980.

Maurice rose to being a top level pole vaulter in 1955. He was the national champion in 1962 and 1963. He took up coaching first with his 1964 Olympic compatriot Hervé d'Encausse who he coached to a bronze medal in the 1966 European Championships behind two future world record holders. Hervé's son Philippe d'Encausse is the coach of former world record holder Renaud Lavillenie. In the next two years Herve would hold the European record on two occasions. Other success stories included François Tracanelli who held the world junior record and would vault in two Olympics, Patrick Abada who also held the European record and Ferenc Salbert, winner of the 1989 Jeux de la Francophonie. In all his athletes would win 19 French national championships.

His greatest success story was Jean Galfione who he coached through his entire career. Galfione won the Olympic gold medal in 1996 and became one of the members of the prestigious Six meters club.

Maurice would hold the Masters M35, M40 and M45 world records.

During the cold winters, Maurice would practice in a coal mine, 500 meters underground.
