= Hennadiy Bleznitsov =

Soviet-Ukrainian pole vaulter

Personal information
- Born: 6 January 1941 (age 85) Kharkiv, Soviet Union

Sport
- Sport: Track and field
- Event: Pole vault
Medal record
Representing Soviet Union
Summer Universiade
Gold medal – first place	1963 Porto Alegre	Pole vault
Silver medal – second place	1965 Budapest	Pole vault
European Indoor Championships
Gold medal – first place	1966 Dortmund	Pole vault
Silver medal – second place	1967 Prague	Pole vault
Silver medal – second place	1968 Madrid	Pole vault
Silver medal – second place	1969 Belgrade	Pole vault

Hennadiy Oleksiyovych Bleznitsov (Ukrainian: Геннадій Блезніцов; born 6 January 1941) is a retired Ukrainian pole vaulter who represented the USSR. He trained at Burevestnik and later at the Armed Forces sports society in Kharkov. He represented his country twice at the Olympic Games, reaching the finals in both 1964 and 1968.

Bleznitsov won two medals at the Universiade, winning the 1963 title in a championship record of 4.60 m before taking a silver in 1965 behind American John Pennel. He was the inaugural pole vault champion at the annual 1966 European Indoor Games and won three silver medals in the subsequent years, beaten by fellow Soviet Igor Feld and East Germany's Wolfgang Nordwig. He was twice a medallist at the European Cup and competed at the 1966 European Athletics Championships, though he failed to register a height.

He won a total of ten Soviet national titles in the pole vault, including four straight wins outdoors from 1963 to 1966. He achieved his career best of 5.30 m (17 ft 4 1/2 in) at the 1968 Olympic final in Mexico City. One of the best vaulters of his generation, he ranked in the global top ten for five straight years, from 1965 to 1969.

== International competitions ==
Year	Competition	Venue	Position	Notes
1963	Universiade	Porto Alegre, Brazil	1st	4.60 m CR
1964	Olympic Games	Tokyo, Japan	5th	4.95 m
1965	Universiade	Budapest, Hungary	2nd	4.90 m
1965	European Cup	Stuttgart, West Germany	3rd	4.80 m
1966	European Indoor Games	Dortmund, West Germany	1st	4.90 m
1966	European Championships	Budapest, Hungary	NH	—
1967	European Indoor Games	Prague, Czechoslovakia	2nd	4.90 m
1967	European Cup	Kyiv, Soviet Union	2nd	5.05 m
1968	European Indoor Games	Madrid, Spain	2nd	5.10 m
1968	Olympic Games	Mexico City, Mexico	6th	5.30 m
1969	European Indoor Games	Belgrade, Yugoslavia	2nd	5.10 m
1970	European Indoor Championships	Vienna, Austria	6th	5.00 m

== National titles ==
- Soviet Athletics Championships
  - Pole vault: 1963, 1964, 1965, 1966, 1968, 1970, 1972
- Soviet Indoor Athletics Championships
  - Pole vault: 1964, 1966, 1967

== See also ==
- List of European Athletics Indoor Championships medalists (men)
