= John-Erik Blomqvist =

Swedish athletics competitor

Personal information
- Born: 17 May 1945 (age 81) Ljuder, Lessebo, Sweden
- Height: 186 cm (6 ft 1 in)
- Weight: 70 kg (154 lb)

Sport
- Sport: Athletics
- Event(s): Pole vault, triple jump
- Club: Nybro IF; Kalmar SK; Malmö AI

Achievements and titles
- Personal best(s): PV – 5.28 m (1973); TJ – 15.11 m

John-Erik Blomqvist (born 17 May 1945) is a retired Swedish pole vaulter who won the national title in 1967. He competed at the 1968 Summer Olympics and placed fifth-sixth at the European championships in 1969 and 1971.
