= John Pennel =

American pole vaulter (1940–1993)

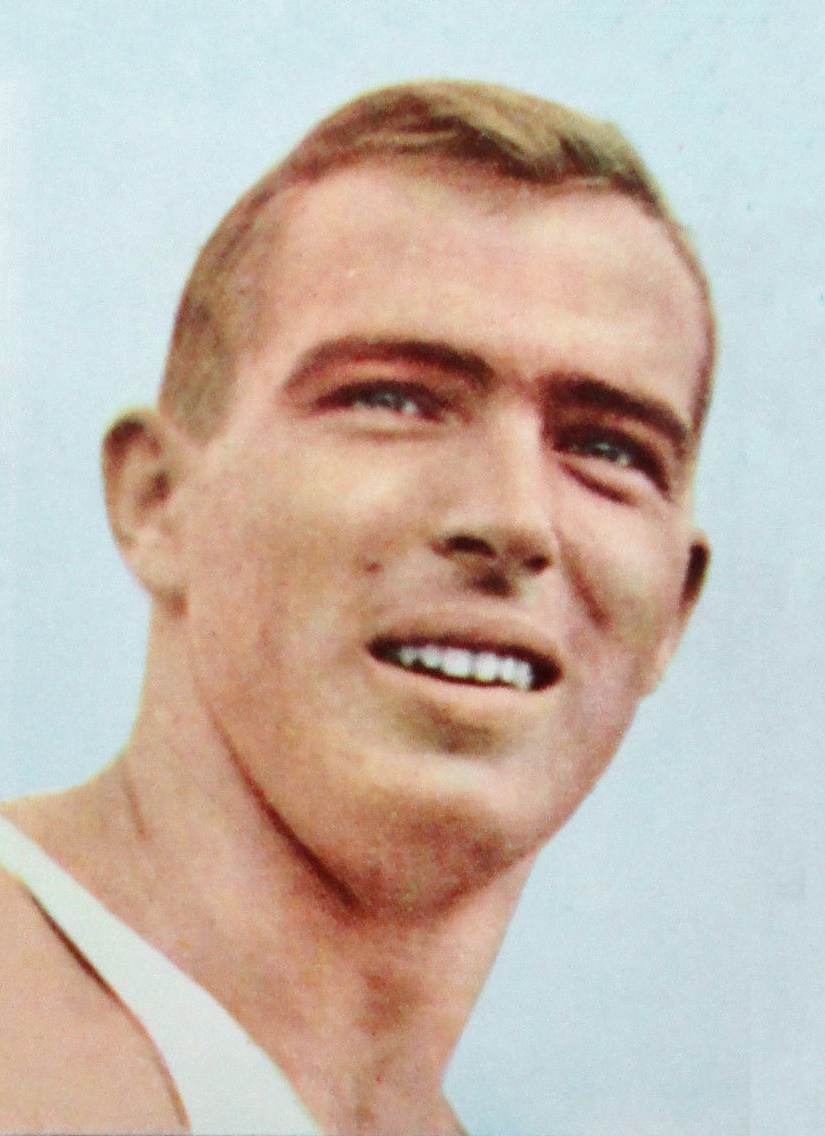

Personal information
- Born: July 25, 1940 Memphis, Tennessee, U.S.
- Died: September 26, 1993 (aged 53) Santa Monica, California, U.S.
- Height: 1.77 m (5 ft 10 in)
- Weight: 76 kg (168 lb)

Sport
- Country: United States
- Sport: Athletics
- Events: Pole vault, long jump
- Club: Southern California Striders, Anaheim

Achievements and titles
- Personal bests: PV – 5.44 m (1969); LJ – 7.13 m (1963)
Medal record
Universiade
Gold medal – first place	1965 Budapest	Pole vault

John Thomas Pennel (July 25, 1940 – September 26, 1993) was an American pole vaulter, and four-time world record holder.

== Career ==
A native of Memphis, Tennessee, Pennel started pole vaulting at his father's farm with an old television aerial. At Coral Gables Senior High School, where he was a member of both the gymnastics and the track and field teams, he cleared 11 feet 3 inches (3.43 m) at the age of 15. Improving steadily under the coaching of Ed Injachock he improved to 3.80 m in 1958 and in 1959 he ranked 8th among American schoolboys with 4.14 m (13 ft 7 in). At one time he also held the Dade County (Florida) record for climbing a 20-foot rope in 4.2 seconds.

In 1959 Pennel went to Northeast Louisiana State College (NLSC) on a track scholarship and continued to improve, clearing 4.32 m (14 ft 2 in) in 1959, and then his big breakthrough came at a meet at Chattanooga on March 19, 1960. Off a dirt runway and using a borrowed aluminium pole he cleared 4.58 m, just a quarter of an inch over fifteen feet and a national record for a college freshman. Unable to reproduce that sort of form outdoors his best for the remainder of the season was 4.39 m (14 ft. 5"). He cleared 4.47 m (14 ft 8 in) in 1961 before switching to the new fiberglass poles and within a very few months began to reap the benefits; on the last day of the year he went over fifteen feet again (4.61 m) in New Orleans and improved to 4.67 m (15 ft. 4") indoors on January 12, 1962, but again failed to repeat his form outdoors that season.

Early in 1963, by which time he is being coached by Bob Groseclose, he cleared sixteen feet in training but was turned down by meeting promoters on the grounds that he wasn't good enough. He travelled to Toronto to prove himself and in his only major indoor meet of the season cleared 4.75 m (15 ft. 7¼") for second place. Outdoors, he started off with 4.80 m (15 ft. 9") and the following week, on March 23, 1963, the man who was not good enough for an indoor meet exceeded the existing world record of 4.94 m with a 4.95 m (16 ft 3") jump at home in Memphis. He did it again the following month with a 4.98 m jump, but neither mark was ratified as a world record. Nineteen-year-old Brian Sternberg had the honor of being the world's first 5.00-metre vaulter in Philadelphia on April 27, 1963. Interviewed afterwards he said, "I don't expect the record to stand a long time", and he was right. Just four days later Pennel surpassed the record with a 5.05 m (16 ft 6¾") leap at Monroe, Louisiana, but, again, his mark was not ratified.

Again at Monroe on May 4, 4.88 m (16 ft 0 in) was enough for first place but on the same day at San Jose American Jeff Chase vaulted 8.74 m (28 ft 8 in); not to worry, they were vaulting for distance, not height. The following weekend decathlete and future world record holder Yang Chuan-kwang became the first man to vault sixteen feet and lose, being beaten by Ron Morris at a meet in Fresno, California. By the end of the month of May there were no less than ten men worldwide over sixteen feet and eight of them were Americans; the other "foreigner" was the Finnish athlete Pentti Nikula, who held the world record Sternberg had broken in April, and Sternberg had equalled Pennel's "world record" at the Modesto relays on May 25. But this was not ratified as a world record. However, Sternberg got his second and final world record at Compton, California on June 7, clearing 5.08 m (16 ft 8 in), and found 5.00 m (16 ft. 4¾") enough to take the NCAA at Albuquerque the following week with Cruz, Cramer, Hansen and Watson in that order all on 4.82 m (15 ft. 9¾"), and strangely he also found 4.98 m (16 ft. 4") sufficient to take the AAU title in St. Louis a week later with Pennel back in sixth place on 4.80m (15 ft. 9"), (the same weekend that Bob Hayes ran the first legal 9.1 s 100 yards).

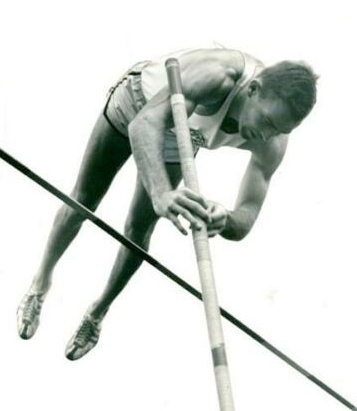
Pennel in 1963

Despite his poor showing in recent weeks Pennel was selected to join the squad that toured Europe that summer, so on Friday July 13 while Ron Hill was busy breaking the Commonwealth 10,000 m record Pennel was at the White City Stadium in London qualifying for the AAA Championships, which he did with ease. The following day he came back for what Mel Watman called a "superlative display" of pole vaulting. Entering the competition at 4.46 m (14 ft. 7½") he cleared first time but needed three tries at 4.57 m (15 ft. 0"), clearing on the third try by "at least eighteen inches". Further attempts were hampered by the three-mile track race being in progress so he had to time his run-up, which started on the track, quite carefully. He cleared both 4.72 m (15 ft. 6") and 4.87 m (16 ft. 0") first time. His first two attempts at the new world record 5.10m (16 ft. 8¾") were aborted as he mis-timed his approach, but on the third try he planted firmly and sailed over. But, again, the mark was not ratified as a world record. He had three attempts at 5.19 m (17ft. 0¼") but they didn't come to anything. However in winning the 1963 AAA Championships title, the British press reported the feat as a world record and the highlight of the Championships.

By now there were thirteen men over sixteen feet and the race was to be the first over seventeen feet. Tragically, Sternberg was no longer in the race. On June 29 while practising a double-back somersault with a twist on the trampoline at college, something he had done hundreds of times before, he landed hard on his neck and was paralysed from the neck down. When told of Pennel's new "world record" the modest Sternberg, who turned 20 just eleven days before his accident said, "I really think it's great about Pennel. He's the most deserving of all of us to represent the United States at Moscow. I don't know of anybody who has tried harder and put more into vaulting than Pennel."

The Americans won the match in Moscow by a mere five points, which Athletics Weekly reported as a "disaster", and Pennel came second in the vault behind Uelses with both of them well below their best. But in Warsaw they "crushed" Poland and Pennel was described as the "star performer" in duplicating his White City world record height, though a language difficulty meant he actually thought he was attempting a new record height of 5.14 m (16 ft. 10¼"). Nikula (the only European so far over 16 feet) failed to impress at the Finnish Championships in Helsinki on July 17, clearing only 4.85 m (15ft. 11") but on July 25 at Karhula the American Ron Morriss set a personal best of 4.92 m (16 ft. 1¾") and three days later at Haapavesi he improved again to 5.00 m (16 ft. 4¾") Then on August 9 the German Wolfgang Reinhardt joined the sixteen-foot club in winning the West German Championships at Augsburg.

Back in London on August 5, Pennel finally set a mark that would be ratified as a world record, improving on Sternberg's 5.08 m. He improved the world record, this time clearing 5.13 m (16 ft. 10") and a few days later on August 25 Morris, still in Finland but now at Mikkeli, moved to third on the all-time list with a vault 5.02 m (16 ft. 5¾"). The previous day, however, at Coral Gables, Florida, using a pole he had borrowed from fellow vaulter Fred Hansen back in March, Pennel had cleared 5.20 m (17ft. 0¾") at his first attempt and just eighteen months after the world's first 16-foot vault he became the world's first 17-foot pole vaulter. The world would have to wait seven years before anyone cleared 18 feet (5.48 m).

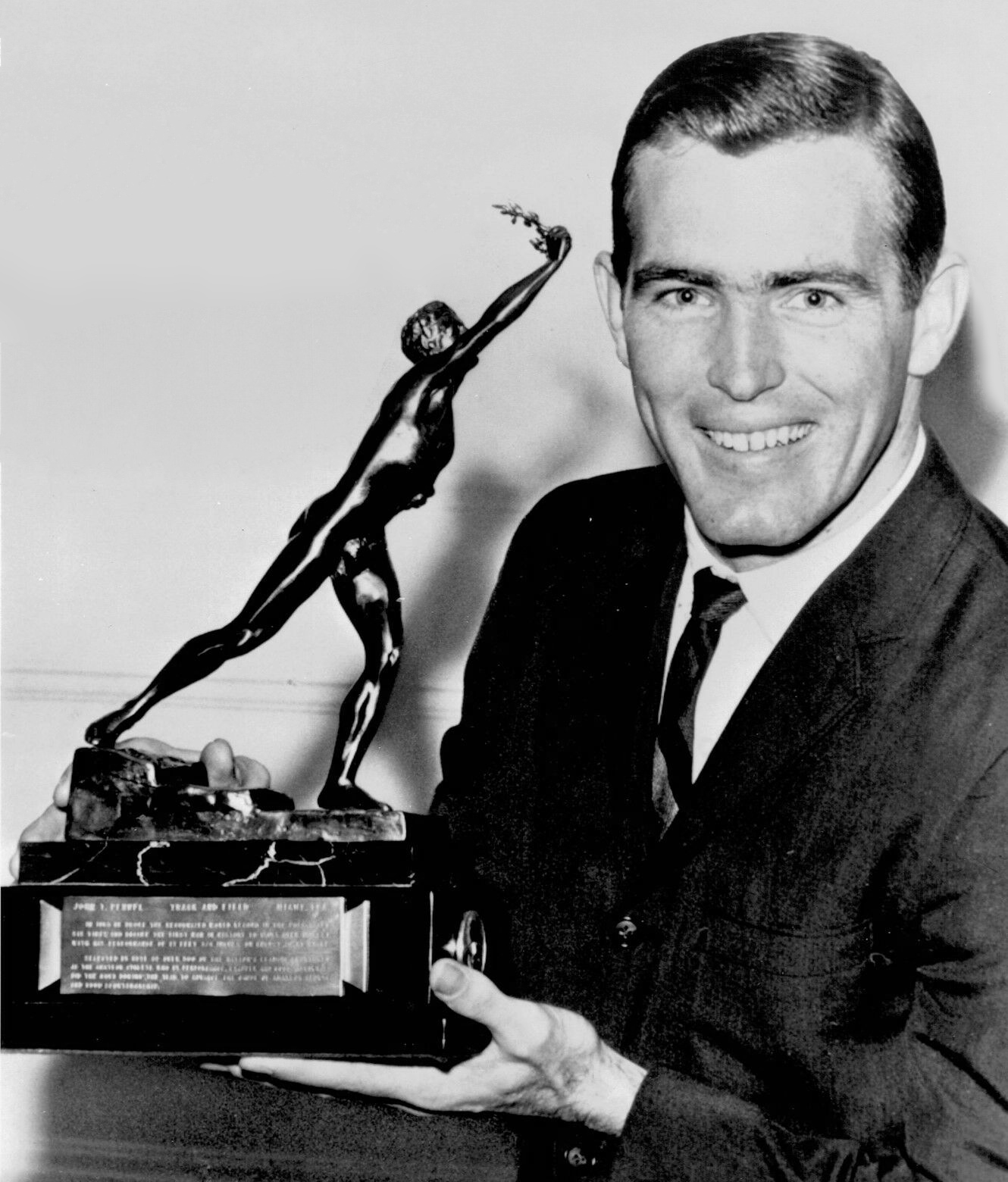
Pennel receiving the James E. Sullivan Award

Following those amazing performances, Pennel was asked to appear on the popular television game show, To Tell The Truth. On the September 9, 1963 episode, Pennel scored against the celebrity panel (Tom Poston, Peggy Cass, Earl Wrightson, and Kitty Carlisle), and immediately donated his winnings to the Brian Sternberg Hospital Fund. On February 27, 1966, he appeared on the popular panel show What's My Line? not as an athlete, but rather as a wine salesman, a career he had just taken up. He nearly stumped the panel, but Bennett Cerf guessed his line at the last moment. Sternberg, a University of Washington pole vaulter, was injured during practice in an accident that left him a quadriplegic. In April 1964, Pennel was awarded the 1963 Sullivan Award as the nation's top amateur athlete, and was favored to capture the gold medal at the 1964 Olympics in Tokyo. Unfortunately, he suffered a back injury six weeks before the Games and finished 11th, with a height of 15–5. American teammate Fred Hansen set an Olympic record with a vault of 16–8¾ and won the gold medal.

In 1967, Pennel was featured as Bachelor Number Three on the popular television show, The Dating Game, episode 67 008, during the second set. Also featured, as Bachelor Number Two, was Burt Reynolds. Pennel was chosen as the favorite by the Bachelorette, who was a gymnast. https://youtu.be/Gcaa0Qw7CmM?t=793

After the Olympics, Hansen vaulted an unratified 17–3¾, and Bob Seagren set the mark at 17–5 two years later. Following Seagren's performance, Pennel reclaimed the record at 17–6 (5.34 m) in 1966, his third ratified world record. Pennel was favored to win an Olympic gold in Mexico City in 1968, but he finished fifth. He cleared 5.40 m on his second attempt, and this would be enough for a medal, but his pole passed under the bar, which was illegal at the time; the rule was abolished next year.

In 1969, Pennel set his fourth and final world record, 17–10¼ (5.44 m). A series of injuries led him to retire from competition in 1970.

After his pole vaulting career, Pennel moved to Glendale, California, and worked in sales for Italian Swiss Colony wines as well as marketing for Adidas and other companies. He also appeared in television commercials.

Pennel and his family appeared on an episode of Family Feud with Richard Dawson that aired on July 6, 1982. https://www.youtube.com/watch?v=2pv_ZD_rA2E

In the early 1990s, he was diagnosed with stomach and liver cancer and died at age 53.

== Hall of Fame ==
Pennel was inducted into the USA Track & Field Hall of Fame in 2004.

Records
Preceded by (United States) Brian Sternberg	Men's Pole Vault World Record Holder; August 5, 1963 – June 13, 1964	Succeeded by (United States) Fred Hansen
Preceded by (United States) Bob Seagren	Men's Pole Vault World Record Holder; July 23, 1966 – June 10, 1967	Succeeded by (United States) Bob Seagren
Preceded by (United States) Bob Seagren	Men's Pole Vault World Record Holder; June 21, 1969 – June 17, 1970	Succeeded by (Germany) Wolfgang Nordwig
