= Erkki Mustakari =

Finnish pole vaulter

Personal information
- Nationality: Finnish
- Born: 13 March 1946 (age 80) Helsinki, Finland

Sport
- Sport: Athletics
- Event: Pole vault

Erkki Mustakari (born 13 March 1946) is a Finnish athlete and sports journalist. He competed in the men's pole vault at the 1968 Summer Olympics.

Mustakari was an All-American vaulter for the Fresno State Bulldogs track and field team, finishing 4th in the pole vault at the 1968 NCAA University Division outdoor track and field championships and 1969 NCAA University Division outdoor track and field championships.

== Personal life ==
Estonian-born Finnish athlete Kalevi Kotkas was Mustakari's maternal uncle. He lives in Mallorca, Spain.
