= Kiyoshi Niwa =

Japanese pole vaulter

Personal information
- Nationality: Japanese
- Born: 7 May 1947 (age 79) Kyoto, Japan
- Height: 176 cm (5 ft 9 in)
- Weight: 67 kg (148 lb)

Sport
- Sport: Athletics
- Event: Pole vault

Kiyoshi Niwa (Japanese: 丹羽 清, Hepburn: Niwa Kiyoshi; born 7 May 1947) is a Japanese track and field athlete. He competed in the men's pole vault at the 1968 Summer Olympics.

Niwa won the British AAA Championships title in the pole vault event at the 1970 AAA Championships.
