= Pentti Nikula =

Finnish pole vaulter (1939–2025)

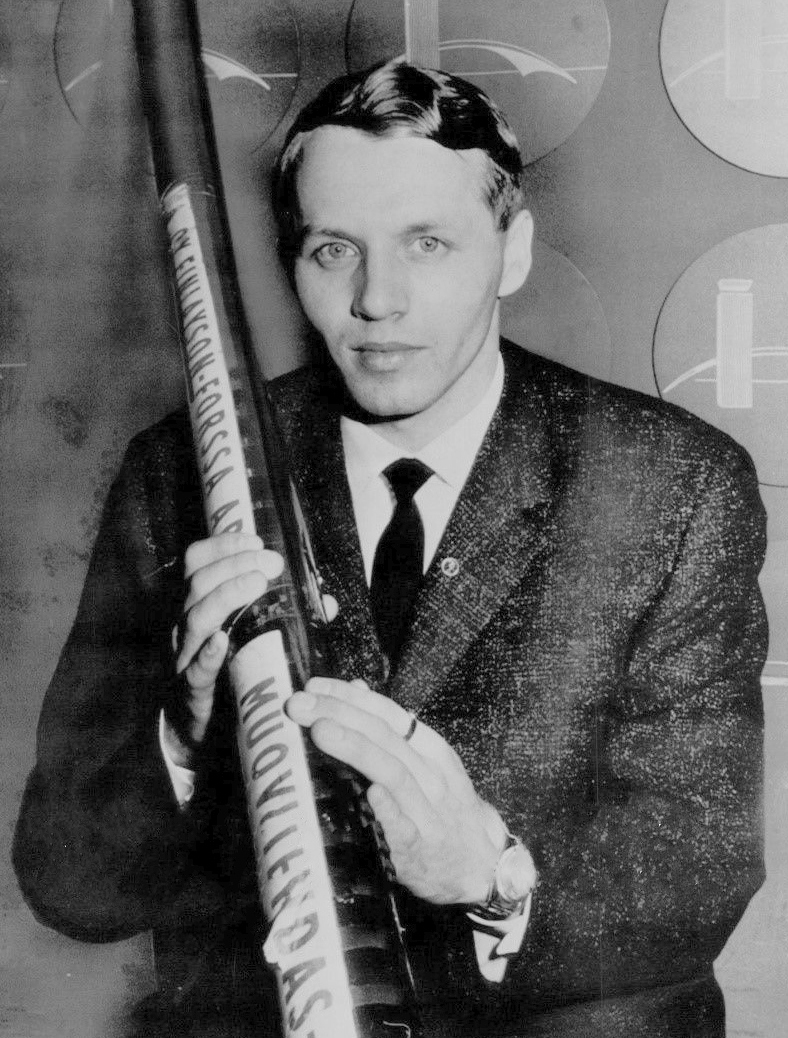
- Nikula in 1963

Personal information
- Nationality: Finnish
- Born: 3 February 1939 Somero, Finland
- Died: 30 October 2025 (aged 86)
- Height: 180 cm (5 ft 11 in)
- Weight: 68–70 kg (150–154 lb)

Sport
- Sport: Athletics
- Event: Pole vault
- Club: Lahden Sampo, Lahti

Achievements and titles
- Personal best: 5.10 mi (1963)
Medal record
Men's athletics
Representing Finland
European Championships
Gold medal – first place	1962 Belgrade	Pole vault

Pentti Kustaa Nikula (3 February 1939 – 30 October 2025) was a Finnish pole vaulter. He won the 1962 European Championships and held one world and four European outdoor records. He placed seventh at the 1964 Summer Olympics.

Nikula won the British AAA Championships title in the pole vault event at the 1962 AAA Championships.

Nikula died on 30 October 2025, at the age of 86.

== See also ==
- Men's pole vault world record progression
- Men's pole vault indoor world record progression

Records
Preceded by (United States) David Tork	Men's Pole Vault World Record Holder; 28 April 1962 – 27 April 1963	Succeeded by (United States) Brian Sternberg
