= Claus Schiprowski =

German pole vaulter

Medal record

Men's athletics

Representing West Germany

Olympic Games
Silver medal – second place	1968 Mexico City	Pole vault

Claus Schiprowski (born 27 December 1942 in Gelsenkirchen) is a West German Olympic silver medalist who competed mainly in the pole vault.

He won his silver medal at the Mexico City 1968 Summer Olympics in the pole vault event.
