= Wolfgang Reinhardt (athlete) =

German pole vaulter (1943–2011)

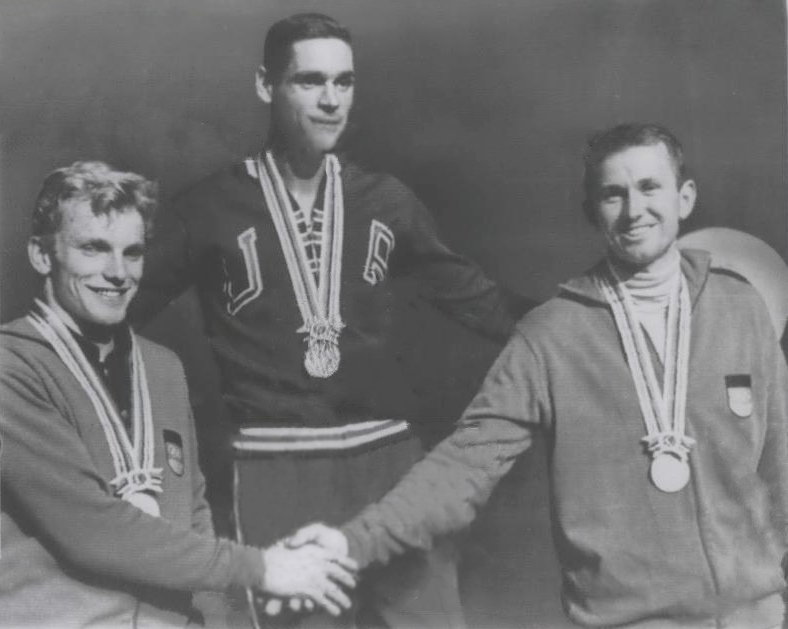
- Reinhardt (left) at the 1964 Olympics

Personal information
- Born: 6 May 1943 Göppingen, Germany
- Died: 11 June 2011 (aged 68) Munich, Germany
- Height: 178 cm (5 ft 10 in)
- Weight: 68 kg (150 lb)

Sport
- Sport: Athletics
- Event: Pole vault
- Club: Bayer Leverkusen

Achievements and titles
- Personal best: 5.25 m (1974)
Medal record
Representing Germany
Olympic Games
Silver medal – second place	1964 Tokyo	Pole vault

Wolfgang Reinhardt (6 May 1943 – 11 June 2011) was a West German pole vaulter. Competing for the United Team of Germany he won a silver medal at the 1964 Olympics and was awarded the Silbernes Lorbeerblatt for this achievement. Domestically he held the West German outdoor (1963–65), and indoors titles (1963 and 1968). He was trained as an engraver, but later in 1961 enrolled to the German Sport University Cologne to study sports. Reinhardt was married to Ortrud Mentges. His brother Hartmut was also a competitive pole vaulter.
