= Hervé d'Encausse =

French pole vaulter (born 1943)

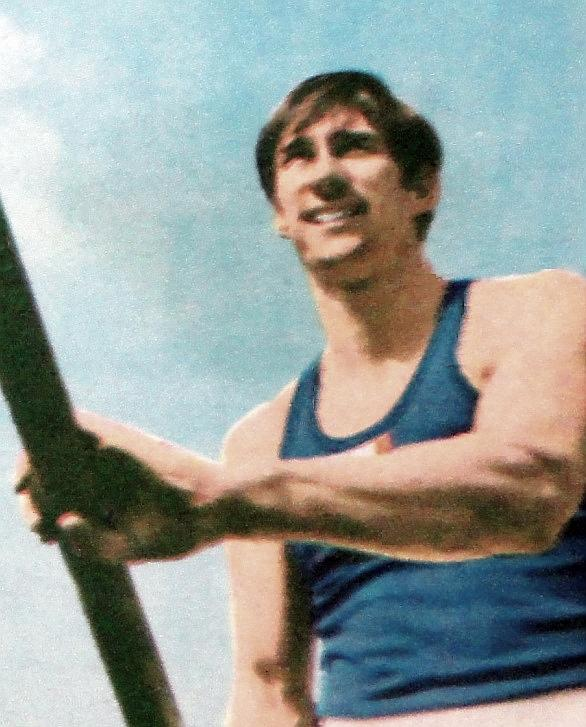

Personal information
- Born: 27 September 1943 (age 82) Hanoi, French Indochina
- Height: 1.80 m (5 ft 11 in)
- Weight: 75 kg (165 lb)

Sport
- Sport: Athletics
- Event: Pole vault
- Club: AS Montferrand, Clermont-Ferrand

Achievements and titles
- Personal best: 5.37 m (1968)
Medal record
Men's athletics
Representing France
European Championships
| Bronze medal – third place | 1966 Budapest | Pole vault |
Mediterranean Games
| Bronze medal – third place | 1963 Naples | Pole vault |

Hervé d'Encausse (French pronunciation: [ɛʁve dɑ̃kos]; born 27 September 1943) is a retired French pole vaulter. He competed at the 1964, 1968 and 1972 Olympics and finished seventh in 1968. His son Philippe is also a retired Olympic pole vaulter, and is currently world record holder Renaud Lavillenie's coach.
