= Altti Alarotu =

Finnish pole vaulter

Personal information
- Nationality: Finnish
- Born: 30 September 1945 Jämijärvi, Finland
- Died: 8 April 2005 (aged 59)

Sport
- Sport: Athletics
- Event: Pole vault

Altti Matti Ensio Alarotu (30 September 1945 – 8 April 2005) was a Finnish athlete. He competed in the men's pole vault at the 1968 Summer Olympics.

Alarotu was an All-American vaulter for the BYU Cougars track and field team, placing runner-up in the pole vault at the 1970 NCAA University Division Outdoor Track and Field Championships.

He competed in the 1967 Little Olympics in Mexico City before making his Olympic debut. He was called a "Flying Finn".
