= Aldo Righi =

Italian pole vaulter

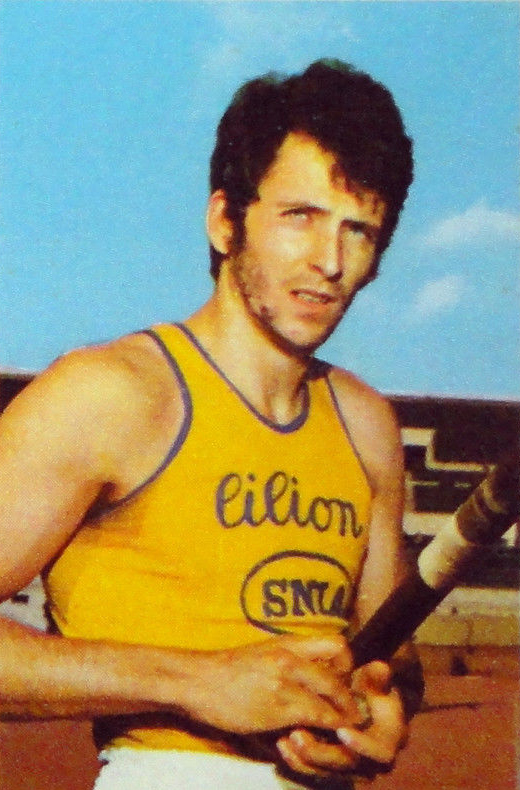

Personal information
- Born: 29 July 1947 (age 79) Riva del Garda, Trento, Italy
- Height: 172 cm (5 ft 8 in)
- Weight: 65 kg (143 lb)

Sport
- Sport: Athletics
- Event: Pole vault

Achievements and titles
- Personal best: 5.10 m (1969)
Medal record
Men's athletics
Representing Italy
European Championships
Bronze medal – third place	1969 Athens	Pole vault

Aldo Righi (born 29 July 1947) is a retired Italian pole vaulter who won a bronze medal at the 1969 European Athletics Championships.

Righi finished third behind fellow Italian Renato Dionisi in the pole vault event at the British 1968 AAA Championships. Later he was selected for the 1968 Olympic Games in Mexico City but was a non starter.
