= Włodzimierz Sokołowski =

Polish pole vaulter

Personal information
- Nationality: Polish
- Born: 3 September 1940 Myszków, Poland
- Died: 29 June 2012 (aged 71) New York City, United States

Sport
- Sport: Athletics
- Event: Pole vault

Włodzimierz Sokołowski (3 September 1940 – 29 June 2012) was a Polish athlete. He competed in the men's pole vault at the 1964 Summer Olympics.
