= Igor Feld =

Soviet pole vaulter

Personal information
- Nationality: Soviet
- Born: 21 February 1941 Leningrad, Soviet Union
- Died: 15 February 2007 (aged 65)

Sport
- Sport: Athletics
- Event: Pole vault
Medal record
Representing Soviet Union
European Indoor Championships
Gold medal – first place	1967 Prague	Pole vault
Summer Universiade
Bronze medal – third place	1965 Budapest	Pole vault

Igor Emiliyevich Feld (Russian: Игорь Эмильевич Фельд, 21 February 1941 – 15 February 2007) was a Soviet athlete. He competed in the men's pole vault at the 1964 Summer Olympics.
