= Rudolf Tomášek =

Czech pole vaulter (1937–2025)

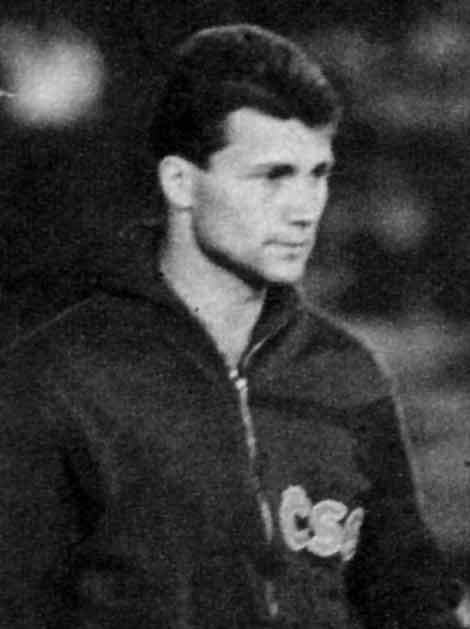
- Tomášek in 1962

Personal information
- Born: 11 August 1937 Karlovy Vary, Czechoslovakia
- Died: 24 September 2025 (aged 88)

Sport
- Country: Czechoslovakia
- Sport: Track and field
- Event: Pole vault

Achievements and titles
- Personal best: 5.03 m
Medal record
Men's athletics
Representing Czechoslovakia
European Championships
Silver medal – second place	1962 Belgrade	Pole vault
European Indoor Championships
Silver medal – second place	1966 Dortmund	Pole vault

Rudolf Tomášek (11 August 1937 – 24 September 2025) was a Czech pole vaulter who represented Czechoslovakia.

== Life ==
Tomášek was born in Karlovy Vary, and represented the club RH Praha. He finished eighth at the 1960 Olympic Games, won the silver medal at the 1962 European Championships, finished sixth at the 1964 Olympic Games, and won the silver medal at the 1966 European Indoor Games and finished ninth at the 1967 European Indoor Games. He became Czechoslovak champion in 1961, 1962, 1963, 1964, 1965, 1966, 1967, and 1971, and Czechoslovak indoor champion in 1971.

In the poll for the best Czechoslovak and later Czech athlete of the year, which still exists today, in 1962 Tomášek became its very first winner. He was the first Czech athlete to break the 5-metre mark (in Oslo in 1964). His personal best jump was 5.03 metres, achieved indoor in 1966.

Tomášek died on 24 September 2025, at the age of 88.
