= Kjell Isaksson =

Swedish pole vaulter

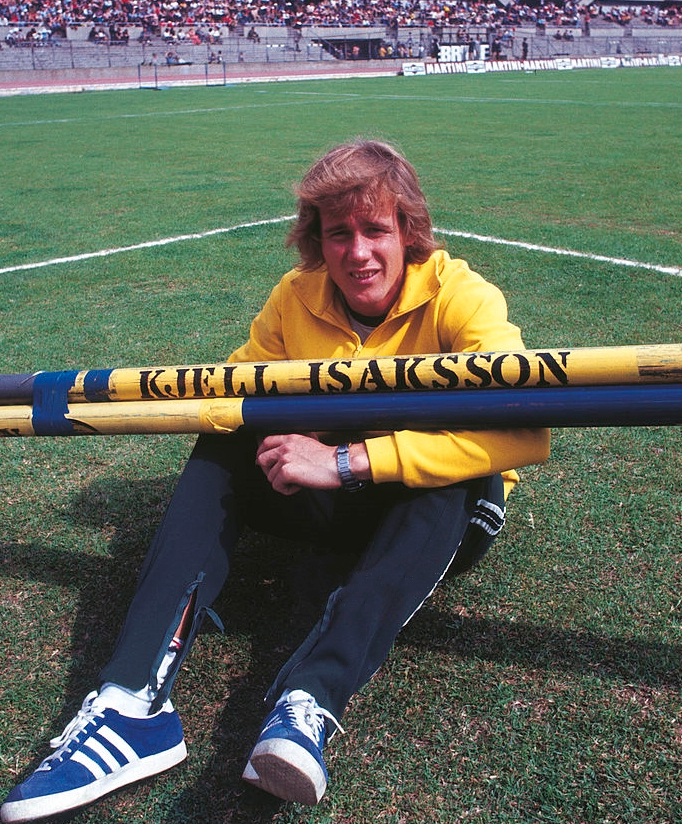
- Isaksson at the 1972 Olympics

Personal information
- Born: 28 February 1948 (age 78) Härnösand, Västernorrland, Sweden
- Height: 1.74 m (5 ft 9 in)
- Weight: 70 kg (154 lb)

Sport
- Sport: Pole vault
- Club: Sundbybergs IK; Österhaninge IF

Achievements and titles
- Personal best: 5.59 m (1972)
Medal record
Men's athletics
Representing Sweden
European Championships
Silver medal – second place	1969 Athens	Pole vault
Silver medal – second place	1971 Helsinki	Pole vault
European Indoor Championships
Silver medal – second place	1970 Vienna	Pole vault
Silver medal – second place	1971 Sofia	Pole vault

Kjell Gunnar Isaksson (born 28 February 1948) is a retired pole vaulter from Sweden, who broke the world record several times in 1972.

== Pole vaulting ==
First he broke the record set by Christos Papanikolaou of Greece and San Jose State University two years earlier, by jumping 5.51 metres in Austin, Texas, becoming the second man to clear 18 feet. A week later he improved it to 5.54 m in Los Angeles, California. His technique inspired several aspects of the Petrov/Bubka model. Two months later he added another centimeter at a meet in Helsingborg, Sweden. His record reign was ended on 2 July 1972 when the reigning Olympic champion Bob Seagren jumped 5.63 m at the U.S. Olympic Trials. Isaksson set his personal best at 5.59 m in El Paso, Texas, on 23 May 1972.

Isaksson competed at the 1968, 1972 and 1976 Olympics with the best result of tenth place in 1968. In 1972 he was handicapped by a sudden change of rules by the IAAF and could not clear any height. He appeared on the cover of Track and Field News several times starting in April 1971, then March, April and June 1972 (with Seagren). Nationally he won the pole vault title in 1968–71 and 1973–79 and was active in bowling in the 2000s.

== Superstars ==
Isaksson achieved international fame in the late 1970s as one of the most successful Superstars competitors, winning two European titles and finishing second in the inaugural 1977 World Championship. He dominated the European competition in 1975 and 1976, defeating the British Superstar David Hemery twice, and scoring 56 points (out of a maximum 80) in the 1975 final. Isaksson was particularly strong in the running events (where he would only be allowed to compete after giving away "handicaps" to his rivals) and the gymnasium. He would gain extra points in weightlifting contests by lifting higher weights in proportion to his body weight than his heavier opponents. This gave him a major chance in the 1977 World Championship, though he was hindered by the IAAF disqualifying him from professional athletics competition (and thus the running events). This was to give his American rival Bob Seagren a major advantage. Now retired from athletics, Seagren was free to compete in the running events and scored enough points here to beat Isaksson into second place. Until Brian Hooper won the last World Final in 1982, Isaksson was the most successful European Superstar ever.

=== Superstars record ===
Year	Event	Position
1975	Spanish Heat	1st
1975	European Final	1st
1976	Swedish Heat	1st
1976	European Final	1st
1977	World Final	2nd
1980	International	2nd

Records
Preceded by (Greece) Christos Papanikolaou	Men's Pole Vault World Record Holder; 8 April 1972 – 2 July 1972	Succeeded by (United States) Bob Seagren
Sporting positions
Preceded by (Greece) Christos Papanikolaou	Men's Pole Vault Best Year Performance; 1971	Succeeded by (United States) Bob Seagren
