= Ignacio Sola =

Spanish pole vaulter

Personal information
- Nationality: Spanish
- Born: 1 February 1944 (age 82) Bilbao, Basque Country, Spain
- Height: 179 cm (5 ft 10 in)
- Weight: 75 kg (165 lb)

Sport
- Sport: Athletics
- Event: Pole vault
Medal record
Representing Spain
Mediterranean Games
Silver medal – second place	1971 Izmir	Pole vault

Ignacio Sola Cortabarria (born 1 February 1944) is a Spanish athlete. He competed in the men's pole vault at the 1964 Summer Olympics and the 1968 Summer Olympics.

Sola finished second behind Mike Bull in the pole vault event at the British 1972 AAA Championships.
