= Heinfried Engel =

German pole vaulter

Personal information
- Born: 8 July 1947 (age 78) Haiger, Hessen, West Germany

Sport
- Sport: Track and field
Medal record
Representing West Germany
Summer Universiade
Gold medal – first place	1967 Tokyo	Pole vault

Heinfried Engel (born 8 July 1947) is a retired pole vaulter from Germany, who represented West Germany during his career. A member of the Union Sportclub Mainz he set his personal best (5.23 metres) on 15 February 1969 at a meet in Barcelona.

== Achievements ==
Year	Competition	Venue	Position	Notes
1967	World Student Games	Tokyo, Japan	1st	
1968	Olympic Games	Mexico City, Mexico	8th	5.20
1970	European Indoor Championships	Vienna, Austria	5th	5.00
1971	European Indoor Championships	Sofia, Bulgaria	4th	5.10
	European Championships	Helsinki, Finland	8th	5.10
1972	European Indoor Championships	Grenoble, France	7th	4.80
