= Christos Papanikolaou =

Greek pole vaulter

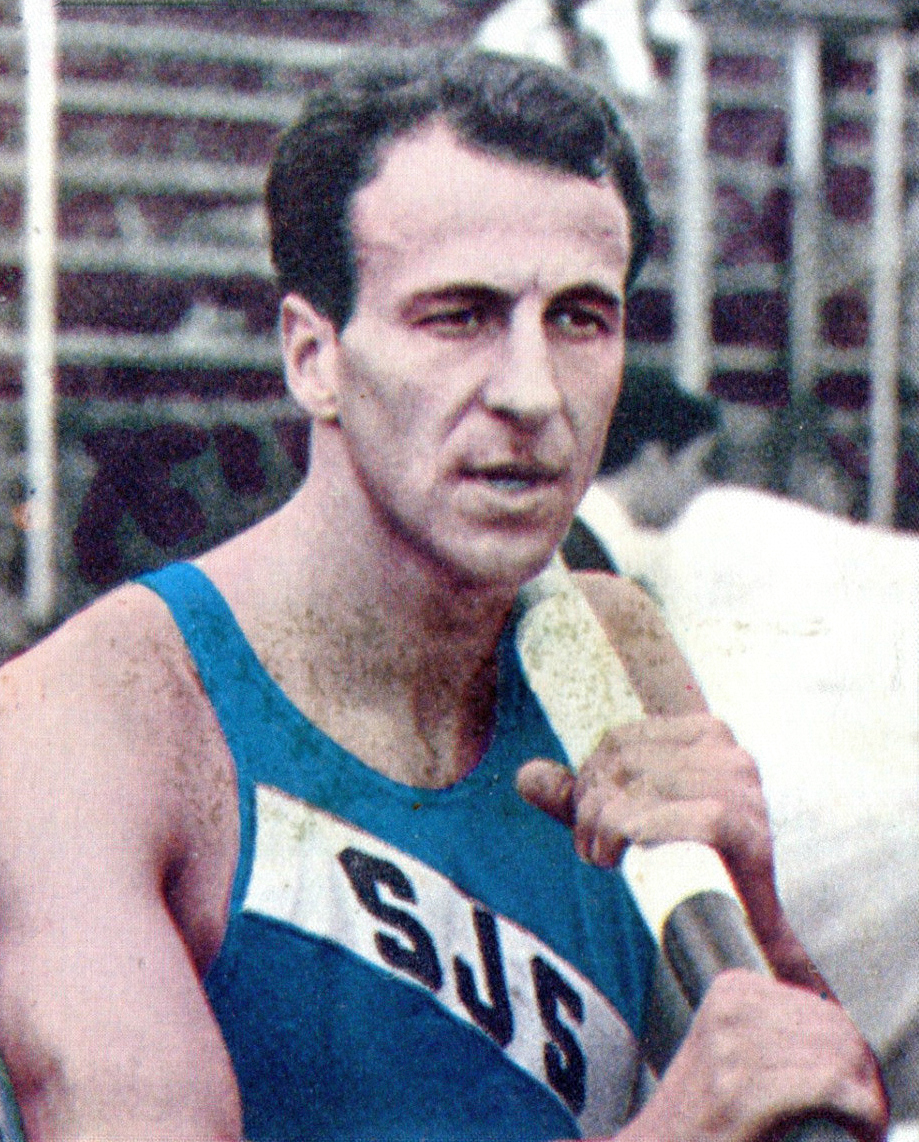

Personal information
- Born: 25 November 1941 (age 84) Trikala, Greece
- Height: 1.82 m (6 ft 0 in)
- Weight: 72 kg (159 lb)

Sport
- Country: Greece
- Sport: Athletics
- Event: Pole vault
- Club: GS Trikalon, Panathinaikos

Achievements and titles
- Highest world ranking: 1st
- Personal best: 5.49 m (1970)
Medal record
Men's athletics
Representing Greece
European Championships
Silver medal – second place	1966 Budapest	Pole vault
Summer Universiade
Silver medal – second place	1970 Turin	Pole vault
Mediterranean Games
Gold medal – first place	1967 Tunis	Pole vault
Gold medal – first place	1971 Izmir	Pole vault

Christos Papanikolaou (Greek: Χρήστος Παπανικολάου, born 25 November 1941) is a Greek retired pole vaulter. On 25 October 1970, he set the world record at 5.49 m (18 ft 0 in), significant to Americans as the first man to pole vault 18 feet. He competed at the 1964, 1968 and 1972 Olympics and finished in 18th, 4th and 11th place, respectively. He won a silver medal at the 1966 European Championships. He was a two-time champion at the Mediterranean Games. He was named the Greek Athlete of the Year, for the years 1965, 1966, 1967, and 1970.

== Biography ==
At a young age Papanikolaou joined the Sports Club of Trikala. After completing his high school he enrolled to the Sports Academy of Athens. While in Athens, he joined Panathinaikos.

His greatest ever championship achievements only came when he won the silver medal at the 1966 European Championships and finished fourth at the 1968 Summer Olympics.

Papanikolaou trained in the United States at San Jose State College and was part of their 1969 NCAA Men's Outdoor Track and Field Championship team coached by Lloyd (Bud) Winter. At the 1970 Universiade in Turin, Papanikolaou finished second behind Wolfgang Nordwig, who won the event with a new world record of 5.46 metres. On 24 October the same year Papanikolaou jumped 5.49 metres in Athens to set a new world record. The vault was featured on the November 1970 cover of Track and Field News. The record was later beaten by Swede Kjell Isaksson on 8 April 1972.

Papanikolaou was ranked by Track and Field News among the top ten pole vaulters a total of seven times between 1966 and 1972, more than any other Greek athlete. His highest position was second in 1970.

== Achievements ==
Year	Competition	Venue	Position	Notes
1966	Balkan Games	Sarajevo, Yugoslavia	1st	5.00
1966	European Championships	Budapest, Hungary	2nd	5.05
1967	Mediterranean Games	Tunis, Tunisia	1st	5.15 CR
1968	Balkan Games	Piraeus, Greece	1st	5.20
1968	Olympic Games	Mexico City, Mexico	4th	5.35 NR, AR
1969	Balkan Games	Sofia, Bulgaria	1st	5.25
1969	European Championships	Athens, Greece	4th	5.00
1970	Balkan Games	Bucharest, Romania	1st	5.40 CR
1970	Universiade	Turin, Italy	2nd	5.42
1971	Balkan Games	Zagreb, Yugoslavia	1st	5.35
1971	Mediterranean Games	İzmir, Turkey	1st	5.20 CR
1972	Balkan Games	İzmir, Turkey	1st	5.40
1972	Olympic Games	Munich, West Germany	11th	5.00
1977	Balkan Games	Ankara, Turkey	1st	5.30

Records
Preceded by (East Germany) Wolfgang Nordwig	Men's Pole Vault World Record Holder; 24 October 1970 – 8 April 1972	Succeeded by (Sweden) Kjell Isaksson
Sporting positions
Preceded by Unknown	Men's Pole Vault Best Year Performance; 1970	Succeeded by (Sweden) Kjell Isaksson
