= Mike Bull =

British pole vaulter and decathlete

Personal information
- Nationality: British (Northern Irish)
- Born: 11 September 1946 (age 79) Belfast, Northern Ireland
- Height: 184 cm (6 ft 0 in)
- Weight: 80 kg (176 lb)

Sport
- Sport: Athletics
- Event: pole vault
- Club: Albert Foundry AC, Queen's University Belfast AC

Michael Anthony Bull (born 11 September 1946) is a retired male pole vaulter and decathlete from Northern Ireland who competed at two Olympic Games.

== Biography ==
Bull became the British pole vault champion after winning the British AAA Championships title at the 1966 AAA Championships. Shortly afterwards Bull represented the Northern Irish team at the 1966 British Empire and Commonwealth Games held in Kingston, Jamaica, where he won silver in the men's pole vault.

Bull retained his pole vault title at the 1967 AAA Championships, 1968 AAA Championships and 1969 AAA Championships (although the 1968 success came as the best placed British athlete). He also appeared for Great Britain at his first Olympic Games at the 1968 Olympic Games in Mexico City.

Bull represented England at the 1970 British Commonwealth Games in Edinburgh, Scotland and won the gold medal.

Bull won two more AAA titles at the 1971 AAA Championships and 1972 AAA Championships before finally losing his crown to Brian Hooper in 1973. At the 1972 Olympics Games in Munich, he represented Great Britain at his second Olympics.

He appeared in 69 internationals for Great Britain and Northern Ireland and captained the team on numerous occasions. In 1991, he won the World Masters (over 40) pole vault in Finland. He set his personal best in the pole vault (5.25 metres) on 22 September 1973 at a meet in London.

Upon retirement from professional athletics, Bull lectured on sports studies and provided sports commentary for UTV (Ulster Television). He opened his own gym in Dufferin Avenue, Bangor, County Down (Northern Ireland), Mike Bull's Health Gym (now Paul's Gym), and was a fitness adviser for the Irish Rugby Football Union.

== Honours ==
In 2012, Dr Mike Bull was awarded the OBE by the Queen for services to sport and charity.

In 2014, Mike Bull was awarded the accolade of "Britain's Greatest Ever Pole-vaulter" in World renowned athletics magazine Athletics Weekly by leading statistician Mel Watman.

== Achievements ==
Year	Competition	Venue	Position	Event
1966	British Empire and Commonwealth Games	Kingston, Jamaica	2nd	Pole vault
1969	European Championships	Athens, Greece	7th	Pole vault
1970	European Indoor Championships	Vienna, Austria	7th	Pole vault
1970	British Commonwealth Games	Edinburgh, Scotland	1st	Pole vault
1972	European Indoor Championships	Grenoble, France	6th	Pole vault
1974	British Commonwealth Games	Christchurch, New Zealand	2nd	Pole vault
1974	British Commonwealth Games	Christchurch, New Zealand	1st	Decathlon
1978	Commonwealth Games	Edmonton, Canada	NM	Pole vault
