= 2013 Doha Diamond League =

- Dates: 10 May 2013
- Host city: Doha, Qatar
- Venue: Suheim bin Hamad Stadium
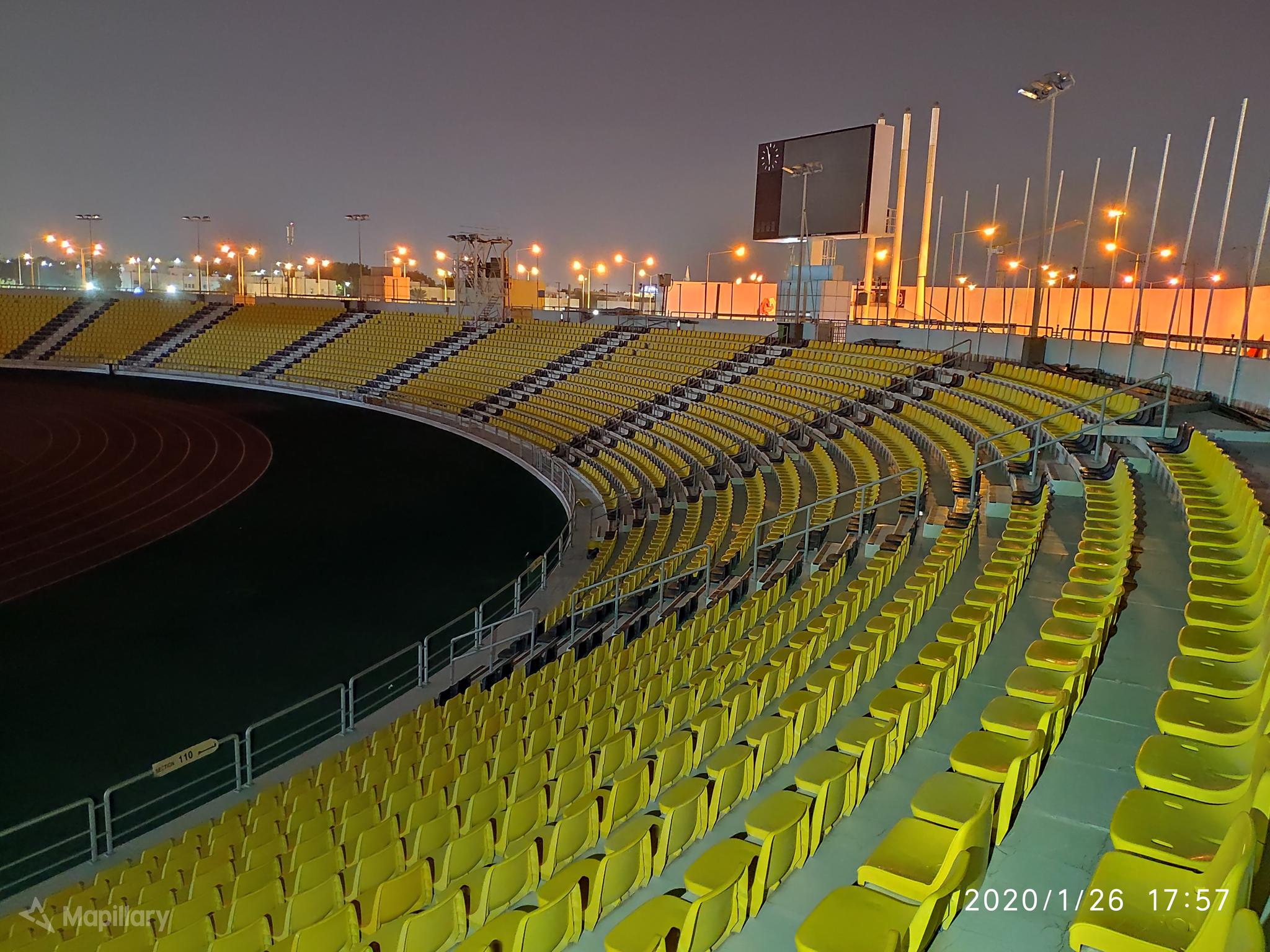
- Level: 2013 Diamond League

The 2013 Doha Diamond League was the 15th edition of the annual outdoor track and field meeting in Doha, Qatar. Held on 10 May at Suheim bin Hamad Stadium, it was the opening leg of the 2013 Diamond League – the highest level international track and field circuit.

== Diamond discipline results ==
Podium finishers earned points towards a season leaderboard (4-2-1 respectively), points per event were then doubled in the Diamond League Finals. Athletes had to take part in the Diamond race during the finals to be eligible to win the Diamond trophy which is awarded to the athlete with the most points at the end of the season.

=== Men's ===
100 Metres
Rank	Athlete	Nation	Time	Points	Notes
1st place, gold medalist(s)	Justin Gatlin	United States	9.97	4	SB
2nd place, silver medalist(s)	Mike Rodgers	United States	9.99	2	SB
3rd place, bronze medalist(s)	Nesta Carter	Jamaica	9.99	1	SB
4	Kim Collins	Saint Kitts and Nevis	10.04		SB
5	Samuel Francis	Qatar	10.08		SB
6	Derrick Atkins	Bahamas	10.14		SB
7	Jak Ali Harvey	Jamaica	10.17		=SB
8	Jason Young	Jamaica	10.21		=SB
			Wind: (+1.2 m/s)		

800 Metres
Rank	Athlete	Nation	Time	Points	Notes
1st place, gold medalist(s)	David Rudisha	Kenya	1:43.87	4	WL
2nd place, silver medalist(s)	Mohammed Aman	Ethiopia	1:44.21	2	
3rd place, bronze medalist(s)	Job Koech Kinyor	Kenya	1:44.24	1	
4	Pierre-Ambroise Bosse	France	1:44.77		PB
5	Musaeb Abdulrahman Balla	Qatar	1:44.83		PB
6	Michael Rimmer	Great Britain	1:44.97		
7	Anthony Chemut	Kenya	1:45.06		SB
8	Andrew Osagie	Great Britain	1:45.41		
9	Timothy Kitum	Kenya	1:46.54		
—	Moses Kipkemboi Kibet	Kenya	DNF		PM

3000 Metres
Rank	Athlete	Nation	Time	Points	Notes
1st place, gold medalist(s)	Hagos Gebrhiwet	Ethiopia	7:30.36	4	WL
2nd place, silver medalist(s)	Thomas Longosiwa	Kenya	7:32.01	2	
3rd place, bronze medalist(s)	Yenew Alamirew	Ethiopia	7:32.64	1	
4	Caleb Ndiku	Kenya	7:33.92		
5	Hayle Ibrahimov	Azerbaijan	7:34.57		NR
6	Isiah Koech	Kenya	7:36.28		
7	Augustine Kiprono Choge	Kenya	7:37.70		
8	Abrar Osman	Eritrea	7:39.70		PB
9	Jairus Birech	Kenya	7:41.83		
10	Geoffrey Kirui	Kenya	7:42.26		
11	Geofrey Barusei	Kenya	7:48.60		PB, PM
12	Mohamed Moustaoui	Morocco	7:49.05		
13	Yigrem Demelash	Ethiopia	7:59.87		
14	Japhet Korir	Kenya	8:10.20		
—	Aziz Lahbabi	Morocco	DNF		
—	Vincent Kipsang Rono	Kenya	DNF		PM

400 Metres hurdles
Rank	Athlete	Nation	Time	Points	Notes
1st place, gold medalist(s)	Michael Tinsley	United States	48.92	4	
2nd place, silver medalist(s)	Bershawn Jackson	United States	49.12	2	
3rd place, bronze medalist(s)	Cornel Fredericks	South Africa	49.35	1	
4	Tristan Thomas	Australia	49.82		
5	Georg Fleischhauer	Germany	50.61		
6	L. J. van Zyl	South Africa	50.74		
7	Justin Gaymon	United States	1:34.57		
—	Jack Green	Great Britain	DNF		

High jump
Rank	Athlete	Nation	Height	Points	Notes
1st place, gold medalist(s)	Bohdan Bondarenko	Ukraine	2.33 m	4	=MR
2nd place, silver medalist(s)	Mutaz Barsham	Qatar	2.30 m	2	SB
3rd place, bronze medalist(s)	Aleksandr Shustov	Russia	2.27 m	1	
4	Robbie Grabarz	Great Britain	2.24 m		
5	Marco Fassinotti	Italy	2.24 m		
6	Sergey Mudrov	Russia	2.24 m		
7	Aleksey Dmitrik	Russia	2.24 m		
8	Donald Thomas	Bahamas	2.24 m		
9	Konstadinos Baniotis	Greece	2.19 m		
10	Peter Horák	Slovakia	2.19 m		
11	Samson Oni	Great Britain	2.19 m		
12	Muamer Aissa Barsham	Qatar	2.09 m		

Pole vault
Rank	Athlete	Nation	Height	Points	Notes
1st place, gold medalist(s)	Konstantinos Filippidis	Greece	5.82 m	4	MR, NR, WL
2nd place, silver medalist(s)	Malte Mohr	Germany	5.82 m	2	=MR, =WL
3rd place, bronze medalist(s)	Raphael Holzdeppe	Germany	5.70 m	1	
4	Tobias Scherbarth	Germany	5.60 m		
5	Hendrik Gruber	Germany	5.60 m		
6	Sergey Kucheryanu	Russia	5.60 m		
7	Björn Otto	Germany	5.50 m		
8	Karsten Dilla	Germany	5.30 m		
—	~~Dmitry Starodubtsev~~	~~Russia~~	~~NM~~		DQ (Note: Although they both ahieved a result of no mark, due to doping violations Starodubtsev's and Mazuryk's results during this competition were disqualified.)
—	~~Maksym Mazuryk~~	~~Ukraine~~	~~NM~~		DQ

Triple jump
Rank	Athlete	Nation	Distance	Points	Notes
1st place, gold medalist(s)	Christian Taylor	United States	17.25 m (+0.5 m/s)	4	SB
2nd place, silver medalist(s)	Benjamin Compaoré	France	17.06 m (+1.3 m/s)	2	SB
3rd place, bronze medalist(s)	Aleksey Fyodorov	Russia	16.85 m (+0.7 m/s)	1	
4	Samyr Lainé	Haiti	16.80 m (±0.0 m/s)		
5	Tosin Oke	Nigeria	16.64 m (+0.5 m/s)		
6	Aliaksei Tsapik	Belarus	16.60 m (+1.7 m/s)		
7	Dimitrios Tsiamis	Greece	16.53 m (±0.0 m/s)		
8	Harold Correa	France	16.31 m (+1.1 m/s)		SB
9	Mohamed Abbas Darwish	United Arab Emirates	15.48 m (+1.4 m/s)		
—	Alphonso Jordan	United States	NM		

Shot put
Rank	Athlete	Nation	Distance	Points	Notes
1st place, gold medalist(s)	Ryan Whiting	United States	22.28 m	4	MR, WL
2nd place, silver medalist(s)	Germán Lauro	Argentina	21.26 m	2	AR
3rd place, bronze medalist(s)	Reese Hoffa	United States	21.01 m	1	
4	Cory Martin	United States	20.55 m		SB
~~5~~	~~Maksim Sidorov~~	~~Russia~~	~~20.14 m~~		DQ (Note: Due to doping violations Sidorov's results during this competition were disqualified.)
6	Tomasz Majewski	Poland	19.96 m		
7	Marco Fortes	Portugal	19.15 m		
8	Om Prakash Karhana	India	18.43 m		
9	Sultan Al-Hebshi	Saudi Arabia	17.76 m		

Javelin throw
Rank	Athlete	Nation	Distance	Points	Notes
1st place, gold medalist(s)	Vítězslav Veselý	Czech Republic	85.09 m	4	
2nd place, silver medalist(s)	Tero Pitkämäki	Finland	82.18 m	2	
3rd place, bronze medalist(s)	Andreas Thorkildsen	Norway	81.51 m	1	
4	Matthias de Zordo	Germany	81.49 m		
5	Ivan Zaytsev	Uzbekistan	81.37 m		
6	Keshorn Walcott	Trinidad and Tobago	79.79 m		
7	Antti Ruuskanen	Finland	76.31 m		
8	Spyridon Lebesis	Greece	73.92 m		
9	Vadims Vasiļevskis	Latvia	71.07 m		
—	Valeriy Iordan	Russia	NM		

=== Women's ===
200 Metres
Rank	Athlete	Nation	Time	Points	Notes
1st place, gold medalist(s)	Shelly-Ann Fraser-Pryce	Jamaica	22.48	4	
2nd place, silver medalist(s)	Sherone Simpson	Jamaica	22.73	2	
3rd place, bronze medalist(s)	Myriam Soumaré	France	22.81	1	
4	Samantha Henry-Robinson	Jamaica	22.97		
5	Kimberly Hyacinthe	Canada	23.07		
6	Yelyzaveta Bryzghina	Ukraine	23.30		
7	Charonda Williams	United States	23.34		
8	Crystal Emmanuel-Ahye	Canada	23.40		
			Wind: (+2.2 m/s)		

400 Metres
Rank	Athlete	Nation	Time	Points	Notes
1st place, gold medalist(s)	Amantle Montsho	Botswana	49.88	4	WL
2nd place, silver medalist(s)	Allyson Felix	United States	50.19	2	
3rd place, bronze medalist(s)	Christine Ohuruogu	Great Britain	50.53	1	SB
4	Francena McCorory	United States	50.58		SB
5	Natasha Hastings	United States	51.32		
6	Shericka Williams	Jamaica	52.23		
7	Marie Gayot	France	52.81		
8	Kimberly Hyacinthe	Canada	57.51		

1500 Metres
Rank	Athlete	Nation	Time	Points	Notes
1st place, gold medalist(s)	Abeba Aregawi	Sweden	3:56.60	4	MR, WL
2nd place, silver medalist(s)	Faith Kipyegon	Kenya	3:56.98	2	NR
3rd place, bronze medalist(s)	Genzebe Dibaba	Ethiopia	3:57.54	1	PB
4	Viola Kibiwot	Kenya	4:00.76		
5	Eunice Sum	Kenya	4:02.05		PB
6	Mary Kuria	Kenya	4:03.56		
7	Siham Hilali	Morocco	4:03.92		
8	Betlhem Desalegn	United Arab Emirates	4:05.13		NR
9	Rababe Arafi	Morocco	4:05.22		PB
10	Gabriele Grunewald	United States	4:05.41		SB
11	Janeth Jepkosgei	Kenya	4:12.61		
12	Isabel Macías	Spain	4:13.41		
13	Dawit Seyaum	Ethiopia	4:14.95		PB
—	Btissam Lakhouad	Morocco	DNF		
—	Lydia Wafula	Kenya	DNF		PM
—	Sonja Roman	Slovenia	DNF		PM

100 Metres hurdles
Rank	Athlete	Nation	Time	Points	Notes
1st place, gold medalist(s)	Dawn Harper-Nelson	United States	12.60	4	WL
2nd place, silver medalist(s)	Kellie Wells	United States	12.73	2	SB
3rd place, bronze medalist(s)	Queen Claye	United States	12.74	1	
4	Tiffany Porter	Great Britain	12.74		SB
5	Lolo Jones	United States	12.97		
6	Veronica Borsi	Italy	13.08		
7	Latisha Holden	United States	13.22		SB
8	Yvette Lewis	United States	14.90		
			Wind: (+0.4 m/s)		

3000 Metres steeplechase
Rank	Athlete	Nation	Time	Points	Notes
1st place, gold medalist(s)	Lydiah Chepkurui	Kenya	9:13.75	4	MR, WL
2nd place, silver medalist(s)	Sofia Assefa	Ethiopia	9:14.61	2	
3rd place, bronze medalist(s)	Hiwot Ayalew	Ethiopia	9:17.60	1	
4	Etenesh Diro	Ethiopia	9:17.78		
5	Milcah Chemos Cheywa	Kenya	9:19.17		
6	Purity Cherotich Kirui	Kenya	9:19.42		PB
7	Habiba Ghribi	Tunisia	9:22.20		
8	Lydia Rotich	Kenya	9:26.31		
9	Ruth Bosibori	Kenya	9:31.81		
10	Birtukan Fente	Ethiopia	9:35.18		
11	Almaz Ayana	Ethiopia	9:37.65		
12	Gesa Felicitas Krause	Germany	9:38.76		
13	Mekdes Bekele	Ethiopia	9:45.86		
14	Poļina Jeļizarova	Latvia	9:47.23		
15	Fancy Cherotich	Kenya	10:09.68		PM
—	Virginia Nyambura Nganga	Kenya	DNF		PM

Long jump
Rank	Athlete	Nation	Distance	Points	Notes
1st place, gold medalist(s)	Brittney Reese	United States	7.25 m (+1.6 m/s)	4	MR, WL
2nd place, silver medalist(s)	Blessing Okagbare	Nigeria	7.14 m (+2.2 m/s)	2	
3rd place, bronze medalist(s)	Janay DeLoach Soukup	United States	7.08 m (+2.2 m/s)	1	
4	Funmi Jimoh	United States	6.92 m (+1.3 m/s)		SB
5	Yelena Sokolova	Russia	6.91 m (+1.9 m/s)		
6	Shara Proctor	Great Britain	6.82 m (+1.6 m/s)		SB
7	Erica Jarder	Sweden	6.66 m (+1.9 m/s)		SB
8	Chelsea Hayes	United States	6.61 m (+1.4 m/s)		
9	Tori Polk	United States	6.46 m (+2.2 m/s)		
10	Whitney Gipson	United States	6.43 m (+2.3 m/s)		
11	Teresa Dobija	Poland	6.27 m (+1.9 m/s)		
Best wind-legal performances
—	Blessing Okagbare	Nigeria	6.92 m (+1.8 m/s)		
—	Janay DeLoach Soukup	United States	6.99 m (+1.8 m/s)		

Discus throw
Rank	Athlete	Nation	Distance	Points	Notes
1st place, gold medalist(s)	Sandra Elkasević	Croatia	68.23 m	4	MR, WL
2nd place, silver medalist(s)	Zinaida Sendriūtė	Lithuania	63.92 m	2	
3rd place, bronze medalist(s)	Anna Rüh	Germany	63.01 m	1	
4	Żaneta Glanc	Poland	62.78 m		SB
5	Natalia Semenova	Ukraine	61.41 m		SB
6	Mélina Robert-Michon	France	61.09 m		
7	Aretha Thurmond	United States	60.19 m		
8	Joanna Wiśniewska	Poland	58.92 m		SB
9	Krishna Poonia	India	55.80 m		

== Promotional events results ==
=== Men's ===
1500 Metres
Rank	Athlete	Nation	Time	Notes
1st place, gold medalist(s)	Asbel Kiprop	Kenya	3:31.13	WL
2nd place, silver medalist(s)	Bethwell Birgen	Kenya	3:31.90	
3rd place, bronze medalist(s)	Ayanleh Souleiman	Djibouti	3:32.59	
4	Collins Cheboi	Kenya	3:32.85	
5	Benson Seurei	Bahrain	3:33.04	
6	Daniel Kipchirchir Komen	Kenya	3:33.05	
7	Aman Wote	Ethiopia	3:33.42	PB
8	Johan Cronje	South Africa	3:33.46	NR
9	Mekonnen Gebremedhin	Ethiopia	3:34.49	
10	Silas Kiplagat	Kenya	3:34.57	
11	Dawit Wolde	Ethiopia	3:34.64	
12	Abdalaati Iguider	Morocco	3:35.85	
13	Mohamad Al-Garni	Qatar	3:35.88	SB
14	Arturo Casado	Spain	3:38.33	
15	Belal Mansoor Ali	Bahrain	3:38.89	
—	Ismael Kombich	Kenya	DNF	PM
—	Viktor Kipchirchir Kebenei	Kenya	DNF	PM

== See also ==
- 2013 Diamond League
