= 2002 World Junior Championships in Athletics – Men's pole vault =

The men's pole vault event at the 2002 World Junior Championships in Athletics was held in Kingston, Jamaica, at National Stadium on 19 and 21 July.

== Medalists ==
| Gold | Maksim Mazuryk; Ukraine |
| Silver | Vladislav Revenko; Ukraine |
| Bronze | Vincent Favretto; France |

== Results ==
=== Final ===
21 July

| Rank | Name | Nationality | Result | Notes |
|---|---|---|---|---|
| 1st place, gold medalist(s) | Maksim Mazuryk | Ukraine | 5.55 | |
| 2nd place, silver medalist(s) | Vladislav Revenko | Ukraine | 5.55 | |
| 3rd place, bronze medalist(s) | Vincent Favretto | France | 5.40 | |
| 4 | Stávros Kouroupákis | Greece | 5.40 | |
| 5 | Artyom Kuptsov | Russia | 5.40 | |
| 6 | Jérôme Clavier | France | 5.40 | |
| 7 | Matti Mononen | Finland | 5.35 | |
| 8 | Przemysław Czerwiński | Poland | 5.30 | |
| 9 | Vasiliy Petrov | Russia | 5.20 | |
| 10 | Gustaf Hultgren | Sweden | 5.10 | |
| 11 | Yevgeniy Olkhovskiy | Israel | 5.10 | |
| 12 | Fábio da Silva | Brazil | 5.00 | |

=== Qualifications ===
19 Jul

==== Group A ====
| Rank | Name | Nationality | Result | Notes |
|---|---|---|---|---|
| 1 | Vincent Favretto | France | 5.15 | q |
| 1 | Artyom Kuptsov | Russia | 5.15 | q |
| 3 | Vladislav Revenko | Ukraine | 5.15 | q |
| 4 | Yevgeniy Olkhovskiy | Israel | 5.15 | q |
| 5 | Stávros Kouroupákis | Greece | 5.15 | q |
| 6 | Matti Mononen | Finland | 5.15 | q |
| 7 | Ron Schieskow | Germany | 5.05 | |
| 8 | Takuro Mori | Japan | 5.05 | |
| 9 | David Foley | Canada | 4.85 | |
| 9 | Matt Weirich | United States | 4.85 | |
| | Robbert-Jan Jansen | Netherlands | NH | |

==== Group B ====
| Rank | Name | Nationality | Result | Notes |
|---|---|---|---|---|
| 1 | Jérôme Clavier | France | 5.15 | q |
| 1 | Maksim Mazuryk | Ukraine | 5.15 | q |
| 3 | Przemysław Czerwiński | Poland | 5.15 | q |
| 4 | Fábio da Silva | Brazil | 5.15 | q |
| 5 | Vasiliy Petrov | Russia | 5.15 | q |
| 5 | Gustaf Hultgren | Sweden | 5.15 | q |
| 7 | Alexander Straub | Germany | 5.05 | |
| 8 | Dmitriy Kabakov | Israel | 4.95 | |
| 9 | Lukás Bechyne | Czech Republic | 4.85 | |
| | José Francisco Nava | Chile | NH | |
| | Tommy Skipper | United States | NH | |

== Participation ==
According to an unofficial count, 22 athletes from 16 countries participated in the event.

- Brazil (1)
- Canada (1)
- Chile (1)
- Czech Republic (1)
- Finland (1)
- France (2)
- Germany (2)
- Greece (1)
- Israel (2)
- Japan (1)
- Netherlands (1)
- Poland (1)
- Russia (2)
- Sweden (1)
- Ukraine (2)
- United States (2)
