= 2010 European Athletics Championships – Men's pole vault =

Men's pole vault at the European Athletics Championships

The men's pole vault at the 2010 European Athletics Championships was held at the Estadi Olímpic Lluís Companys on 29 and 31 July.

== Medalists ==
Gold	Renaud Lavillenie; France (FRA)
Silver	Maksym Mazuryk; Ukraine (UKR)
Bronze	Przemysław Czerwiński; Poland (POL)

== Records ==
Standing records prior to the 2010 European Athletics Championships
World record	Sergey Bubka (UKR)	6.14	Sestriere, Italy	31 July 1994
European record	Sergey Bubka (UKR)	6.14	Sestriere, Italy	31 July 1994
Championship record	Rodion Gataullin (RUS)	6.00	Helsinki, Finland	11 August 1994
World Leading	Renaud Lavillenie (FRA)	5.94	Valence, France	10 July 2010
European Leading	Renaud Lavillenie (FRA)	5.94	Valence, France	10 July 2010

== Schedule ==
Date	Time	Round
29 July 2010	10:15	Qualification
31 July 2010	18:00	Final

== Results ==
=== Qualification ===
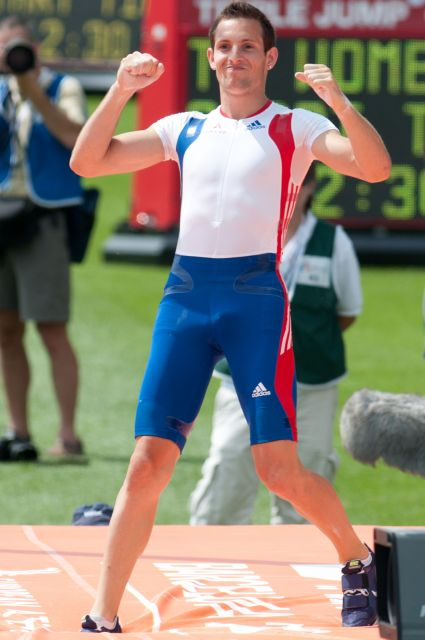
Lavillenie built on his 2009 World bronze to win his first European title in the event.

Qualification: Qualification Performance 5.65 (Q) or at least 12 best performers advance to the final

Rank	Group	Athlete	Nationality	5.10	5.30	5.40	5.50	5.60	5.65	Result	Notes
1	B	Giuseppe Gibilisco	Italy	-	-	-	o	o	o	5.65	Q
2	A	Maksym Mazuryk	Ukraine	-	-	o	o	xo	o	5.65	Q
3	B	Jan Kudlička	Czech Republic	-	xxo	-	xo	xo	o	5.65	Q, SB
4	B	Łukasz Michalski	Poland	-	-	o	-	o	xo	5.65	Q
4	B	Renaud Lavillenie	France	-	-	o	-	o	xo	5.65	Q
6	A	Romain Mesnil	France	-	-	-	o	xxo	xo	5.65	Q
6	A	Raphael Holzdeppe	Germany	-	-	-	xxo	-	xo	5.65	Q
8	B	Fabian Schulze	Germany	-	-	x-	xo	xxo	xo	5.65	Q
9	A	Damiel Dossévi	France	-	-	-	o	o	xxx	5.60	q
10	B	Przemysław Czerwiński	Poland	-	o	-	xo	o	xxx	5.60	q
11	B	Dmitry Starodubtsev	Russia	-	xo	-	xo	o	xxx	5.60	q
12	A	Mateusz Didenkow	Poland	-	o	-	o	xo	xxx	5.60	q
13	A	Michal Balner	Czech Republic	-	-	xo	o	xxo	xxx	5.60	
13	B	Eemeli Salomäki	Finland	-	o	xo	o	xxo	xxx	5.60	=PB
15	B	Jurij Rovan	Slovenia	-	xxo	-	o	xxx		5.50	=SB
16	A	Giorgio Piantella	Italy	-	xxo	xo	o	xxx		5.50	
17	B	Malte Mohr	Germany	-	-	-	xo	-	xxx	5.50	
17	A	Vesa Rantanen	Finland	-	o	o	xo	xxx		5.50	=SB
19	B	Rasmus Wejnold Jørgensen	Denmark	o	o	o	xxo	xxx		5.50	PB
20	B	Robbert-Jan Jansen	Netherlands	-	xo	xo	xxo	xxx		5.50	
21	A	Konstantinos Filippidis	Greece	o	o	o	xxx			5.40	
21	A	Leonid Kivalov	Russia	o	-	o	xxx			5.40	
23	A	Brian Mondschein	Israel	o	o	xxx				5.30	
24	B	Yevgeniy Olkhovskiy	Israel	o	xo	xxx				5.30	
25	A	Spas Bukhalov	Bulgaria	-	xxo	-	xxx			5.30	
26	A	Edi Maia	Portugal	o	xxx					5.10	
	B	Igor Bychkov	Spain	-	xxx					NM	
	B	Denys Yurchenko	Ukraine	-	-	xxx				NM	Doping
	A	Aleksandr Gripich	Russia	-	xxx					NM	

=== Final ===
Rank	Athlete	Nationality	5.40	5.50	5.60	5.65	5.70	5.75	5.80	5.85	6.02	Result	Notes
1st place, gold medalist(s)	Renaud Lavillenie	France	-	-	xo	-	-	xo	o	o	xxx	5.85	
2nd place, silver medalist(s)	Maksym Mazuryk	Ukraine	o	xo	xo	-	o	o	xo	xxx		5.80	SB
3rd place, bronze medalist(s)	Przemysław Czerwiński	Poland	o	-	o	-	xx-	o	xx-	x		5.75	SB
4	Giuseppe Gibilisco	Italy	-	-	o	-	-	xo	-	xxx		5.75	SB
5	Damiel Dossévi	France	-	-	xxo	-	xo	x-	xx			5.70	
6	Fabian Schulze	Germany	-	o	xxo	-	xxo	x-	xx			5.70	=SB
7	Łukasz Michalski	Poland	-	o	-	xo	-	x-	xx			5.65	
8	Romain Mesnil	France	-	-	o	-	-	xx-	x			5.60	
9	Raphael Holzdeppe	Germany	-	xxo	o	-	xxx					5.60	
10	Jan Kudlička	Czech Republic	xo	-	xo	xxx						5.60	
11	Mateusz Didenkow	Poland	xo	xo	x-	xx						5.50	
	Dmitry Starodubtsev	Russia	xxx									NM	
