= 2005 European Athletics U23 Championships – Men's pole vault =

The men's pole vault event at the 2005 European Athletics U23 Championships was held in Erfurt, Germany, at Steigerwaldstadion on 14 and 16 July.

== Medalists ==
Gold	Damiel Dossévi; France
Silver	Fabian Schulze; Germany
Bronze	Matti Mononen; Finland
Bronze	Jérôme Clavier; France

== Results ==
=== Final ===
16 July

Rank	Name	Nationality	Attempts											Result	Notes
Rank	Name	Nationality	5.00	5.15	5.30	5.40	5.50	5.55	5.60	5.65	5.70	5.75	5.80	Result	Notes
1st place, gold medalist(s)	Damiel Dossévi	France	–	–	–	o	–	o	–	xo	xo	xo	xxx	5.75	
2nd place, silver medalist(s)	Fabian Schulze	Germany	–	–	–	o	–	xxo	x–	xo	xx–	x		5.65	
3rd place, bronze medalist(s)	Matti Mononen	Finland	–	–	o	–	o	–	o	xxx				5.60	
3rd place, bronze medalist(s)	Jérôme Clavier	France	–	–	o	–	o	o	o	xxx				5.60	
5	Vincent Favretto	France	–	–	xo	–	o	–	o	xxx				5.60	
6	Maksym Mazuryk	Ukraine	–	o	–	xo	o	–	xo	xxx				5.60	
7	Przemysław Czerwiński	Poland	–	–	xo	–	xo	–	xxx					5.50	
8	Jesper Fritz	Sweden	–	o	o	o	xxx							5.40	
9	Artyom Kuptsov	Russia	–	–	o	xo	–	xx–	x					5.40	
10	Alexander Straub	Germany	xo	xo	o	xo	xxx							5.40	
11	Andrej Poljanec	Slovenia	o	xo	xo	xxx								5.30	
12	Keith Higham	United Kingdom	–	o	xxo	xxx								5.30	
13	Nikolaos Sidihakis	Greece	xo	o	xxx									5.15	

=== Qualifications ===
14 July
Qualifying 5.40 or 12 best to the Final

==== Group A ====
Rank	Name	Nationality	Result	Notes
1	Przemysław Czerwiński	Poland	5.25	q
1	Artyom Kuptsov	Russia	5.25	q
1	Andrej Poljanec	Slovenia	5.25	q
1	Jesper Fritz	Sweden	5.25	q
5	Jérôme Clavier	France	5.25	q
5	Alexander Straub	Germany	5.25	q
7	Tobias Scherbarth	Germany	5.10	
7	Robbert Jansen	Netherlands	5.10	
7	Gustaf Hultgren	Sweden	5.10	
10	Olli Rannikko	Finland	4.90	
	Johan Carlsson	Sweden	NM	
	Vladyslav Revenko	Ukraine	NM	

==== Group B ====
Rank	Name	Nationality	Result	Notes
1	Damiel Dossévi	France	5.30	q
1	Vincent Favretto	France	5.30	q
3	Matti Mononen	Finland	5.30	q
3	Fabian Schulze	Germany	5.30	q
5	Maksym Mazuryk	Ukraine	5.25	q
6	Keith Higham	United Kingdom	5.10	q
6	Nikolaos Sidihakis	Greece	5.10	q
8	Denys Fedas	Ukraine	5.10	
9	Yevgeniy Olkhovskiy	Israel	4.90	
	Zoltán Szörényi	Hungary	NM	

== Participation ==
According to an unofficial count, 22 athletes from 13 countries participated in the event.

- Finland (2)
- France (3)
- Germany (3)
- Greece (1)
- Hungary (1)
- Israel (1)
- Netherlands (1)
- Poland (1)
- Russia (1)
- Slovenia (1)
- Sweden (3)
- Ukraine (3)
- United Kingdom (1)
