= 2003 European Athletics U23 Championships – Men's pole vault =

The men's pole vault event at the 2003 European Athletics U23 Championships was held in Bydgoszcz, Poland, at Zawisza Stadion on 18 and 20 July.

== Medalists ==
Gold	Oleksandr Korchmid; Ukraine
Silver	Marvin Osei-Tutu; Germany
Bronze	Maksym Mazuryk; Ukraine

== Results ==
=== Final ===
20 July

Rank	Name	Nationality	Attempts							Result	Notes
Rank	Name	Nationality	5.00	5.15	5.30	5.40	5.45	5.50	5.55	Result	Notes
1st place, gold medalist(s)	Oleksandr Korchmid	Ukraine	–	–	xo	o	o	o	xxx	5.50	
2nd place, silver medalist(s)	Marvin Osei-Tutu	Germany	–	–	xo	xxo	–	o	xxx	5.50	
3rd place, bronze medalist(s)	Maksym Mazuryk	Ukraine	–	o	o	xxo	o	–	xxx	5.45	
4	Giorgio Piantella	Italy	xo	o	o	xxx				5.30	
5	Mark Beharrell	United Kingdom	xxo	xxo	xo	xxx				5.30	
6	Kevin Rans	Belgium	–	xo	xxx					5.15	
7	Paweł Szczyrba	Poland	xxo	xxx						5.00	
	Matti Mononen	Finland	–	–	xxx					NM	
	Filippos Sgouros	Greece	–	xxx						NM	
	Stavros Kouroupakis	Greece	–	–	–	xxx				NM	
	Dmitriy Kuptsov	Russia	–	–	xxx					NM	
	Alberto Martínez	Spain								DNS	

=== Qualifications ===
18 July
Qualifying 5.40 or 12 best to the Final

==== Group A ====
Rank	Name	Nationality	Result	Notes
1	Dmitriy Kuptsov	Russia	5.30	q
1	Oleksandr Korchmid	Ukraine	5.30	q
1	Maksym Mazuryk	Ukraine	5.30	q
4	Paweł Szczyrba	Poland	5.30	q
5	Giorgio Piantella	Italy	5.30	q
6	Kevin Rans	Belgium	5.30	q
6	Stavros Kouroupakis	Greece	5.30	q
8	Alberto Martínez	Spain	5.25	q
9	Sébastien Homo	France	5.20	
10	Jarno Kivioja	Finland	5.15	
10	Fredrik Skoglund	Sweden	5.15	
12	Mikael Westö	Finland	5.15	

==== Group B ====
Rank	Name	Nationality	Result	Notes
1	Marvin Osei-Tutu	Germany	5.35	q
2	Mark Beharrell	United Kingdom	5.30	q
3	Matti Mononen	Finland	5.30	q
4	Filippos Sgouros	Greece	5.25	q
5	Damiel Dossévi	France	5.20	
5	Przemysław Czerwiński	Poland	5.20	
7	Jérôme Clavier	France	5.20	
8	Roger Noguera	Spain	5.15	
9	Andrey Chemov	Russia	5.15	
	Rudolf Haraksim	Slovakia	NM	
	Alhaji Jeng	Sweden	NM	

== Participation ==
According to an unofficial count, 23 athletes from 13 countries participated in the event.

- Belgium (1)
- Finland (3)
- France (3)
- Germany (1)
- Greece (2)
- Italy (1)
- Poland (2)
- Russia (2)
- Slovakia (1)
- Spain (2)
- Sweden (2)
- Ukraine (2)
- United Kingdom (1)
