= 2006 European Athletics Championships – Men's pole vault =

Men's pole vault at the European Athletics Championships

The men's pole vault at the 2006 European Athletics Championships was held at the Ullevi on August 10 and August 13. Lobinger and Mesnil both claimed 2nd place, and therefore both received silver medals.

== Medalists ==
Gold	Silver	Silver
Aleksandr Averbukh; Israel	Tim Lobinger; Germany	Romain Mesnil; France

== Schedule ==
Date	Time	Round
August 10, 2006	10:10	Qualification
August 13, 2006	12:45	Final

== Results ==
=== Qualification ===
Qualification: Qualifying Performance 5.65 (Q) or at least 18 best performers (q) advance to the final.
Competition was abandoned due to heavy rain. 20 athletes advanced to the final.

Rank	Group	Name	Nationality	5.35	5.45	5.55	5.60	Result	Notes
1	B	Lars Börgeling	Germany	-	o	-	o	5.60	q
2	B	Przemysław Czerwiński	Poland	o	-	xo	o	5.60	q
2	B	Romain Mesnil	France	xo	-	o	o	5.60	q
4	B	Alhaji Jeng	Sweden	-	xxo	xo	o	5.60	q
5	A	Spas Bukhalov	Bulgaria	-	o	-	xo	5.60	q
5	A	Oleksandr Korchmid	Ukraine	-	o	-	xo	5.60	q
7	B	Maksym Mazuryk	Ukraine	o	o	o	xx-	5.55	q
8	A	Damiel Dossévi	France	xo	-	o	xx	5.55	q
8	A	Laurens Looije	Netherlands	o	xo	o	xx	5.55	q, SB
10	B	Igor Alekseev	Belarus	o	xxo	o	xx-	5.55	q, SB
11	A	Gustaf Hultgren	Sweden	o	o	xo	x	5.55	q
11	A	Tim Lobinger	Germany	-	o	xo	-	5.55	q
13	A	Vincent Favretto	France	o	xo	xxo	xx	5.55	q
13	B	Matti Mononen	Finland	-	xo	xxo	xx	5.55	q
15	A	Aleksandr Averbukh	Israel	-	o	-	xx	5.45	q
15	A	Richard Spiegelburg	Germany	-	o	-	xx	5.45	q
15	B	Christian Tamminga	Netherlands	o	o	xxx		5.45	q
18	A	Sergey Kucheryanu	Russia	xo	o	xxx		5.45	q
19	A	Giuseppe Gibilisco	Italy	-	xo	xxx		5.45	q
19	B	Iliyan Efremov	Bulgaria	-	xo	-	xx	5.45	q
21	B	Jesper Fritz	Sweden	xo	xo	xxx		5.45	
21	B	Dmitry Starodubtsev	Russia	xo	xo	xxx		5.45	
23	A	Kevin Rans	Belgium	o	-	xxx		5.35	
24	A	Adam Ptáček	Czech Republic	xo	xxx			5.35	
24	B	Štěpán Janáček	Czech Republic	xo	-	xxx		5.35	
26	B	Konstadinos Filippidis	Greece	xxo	xxx			5.35	
	B	Denys Yurchenko	Ukraine	-	xx-			NM	

=== Final ===
Rank	Name	Nationality	5.40	5.50	5.60	5.65	5.70	5.75	5.80	Result	Notes
1st place, gold medalist(s)	Aleksandr Averbukh	Israel	-	o	-	-	o	-	xxx	5.70	
2nd place, silver medalist(s)	Tim Lobinger	Germany	-	o	-	o	-	xxx		5.65	
2nd place, silver medalist(s)	Romain Mesnil	France	-	o	-	o	x-	xx		5.65	
4	Matti Mononen	Finland	-	xo	-	o	x-	xx		5.65	
5	Przemysław Czerwiński	Poland	o	xo	xo	o	xx-	x		5.65	
6	Oleksandr Korchmid	Ukraine	-	xo	xxo	-	xxx			5.60	
7	Giuseppe Gibilisco	Italy	-	o	-	x-	x-	x		5.50	
8	Laurens Looije	Netherlands	xo	o	xxx					5.50	
8	Maksym Mazuryk	Ukraine	xo	o	xxx					5.50	
10	Vincent Favretto	France	xo	xo	xxx					5.50	
10	Gustaf Hultgren	Sweden	xo	xo	xxx					5.50	
10	Sergey Kucheryanu	Russia	xo	xo	xxx					5.50	
13	Iliyan Efremov	Bulgaria	o	xxx						5.40	
13	Richard Spiegelburg	Germany	o	-	xxx					5.40	
15	Christian Tamminga	Netherlands	xo	xxx						5.40	
15	Damiel Dossévi	France	xo	-	xxx					5.40	
17	Igor Alekseev	Belarus	xxo	xxx						5.40	
	Lars Börgeling	Germany	-	xxx						NM	
	Spas Bukhalov	Bulgaria	xxx							NM	
	Alhaji Jeng	Sweden	-	-	x					NM	
