= 2009 European Athletics Indoor Championships – Men's pole vault =

The Men's pole vault event at the 2009 European Athletics Indoor Championships was held on March 7–8.

== Medalists ==
Gold	Silver	Bronze
Renaud Lavillenie; France	Pavel Gerasimov; Russia	Alexander Straub; Germany

== Results ==
=== Qualification ===
Qualification: Qualification Performance 5.75 (Q) or at least 8 best performers advanced to the final.

Rank	Athlete	Nationality	5.20	5.40	5.55	5.65	5.70	Result	Notes
1	Renaud Lavillenie	France	–	o	o	o	o	5.70	q
2	Romain Mesnil	France	–	–	xo	o	o	5.70	q
3	Steven Lewis	Great Britain	–	xo	xo	xo	o	5.70	q
4	Pavel Gerasimov	Russia	–	o	o	o	xo	5.70	q
5	Łukasz Michalski	Poland	o	o	xo	xo	xo	5.70	q, PB
5	Spas Bukhalov	Bulgaria	–	o	xxo	o	xo	5.70	q, SB
5	Alexander Straub	Germany	–	o	xo	xo	xo	5.70	q
8	Alhaji Jeng	Sweden	–	xo	o	xo	xxx	5.65	q
9	Danny Ecker	Germany	–	xo	–	xxo	xxx	5.65	
10	Malte Mohr	Germany	–	o	xxo	xxo	xxx	5.65	
11	Dmitriy Starodubtsev	Russia	o	o	o	xxx		5.55	
11	Mateusz Didenkow	Poland	–	o	o	xxx		5.55	
DQ	Kevin Rans	Belgium	o	xo	xxx			~~5.40~~	Doping
13	Viktor Chistyakov	Russia	o	xxo	xxx			5.40	
13	Michal Balner	Czech Republic	–	xxo	xxx			5.40	
15	Giorgio Piantella	Italy	o	xxo	xxx			5.40	
16	Adam Kolasa	Poland	xo	xxx				5.20	
	Rasmus Jørgensen	Denmark	xxx					NM	
	Giuseppe Gibilisco	Italy	–	–	xxx			NM	

=== Final ===
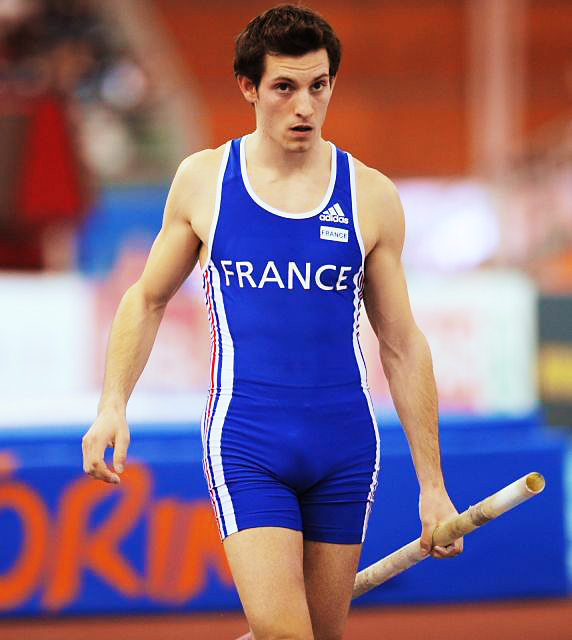
Renaud Lavillenie of France won his first major title at these championships.

Rank	Athlete	Nationality	5.41	5.51	5.61	5.71	5.76	5.81	5.91	Result	Notes
1st place, gold medalist(s)	Renaud Lavillenie	France	–	o	–	o	o	o	xxx	5.81	=PB
2nd place, silver medalist(s)	Pavel Gerasimov	Russia	–	xo	o	o	o	xxx		5.76	
3rd place, bronze medalist(s)	Alexander Straub	Germany	–	o	–	xxo	o	xxx		5.76	
4	Steven Lewis	Great Britain	o	–	o	xo	xxx			5.71	
5	Alhaji Jeng	Sweden	–	xxo	–	xxo	–	xxx		5.71	
6	Łukasz Michalski	Poland	o	–	o	xxx				5.61	
7	Romain Mesnil	France	–	o	xxo	–	x–	xx		5.61	
8	Spas Bukhalov	Bulgaria	xxo	–	xxx					5.41	
