= Gustaf Hultgren =

Swedish pole vaulter

Gustaf Hultgren (born 18 August 1983) is a Swedish pole vaulter and coach. He competed at one European Championships and won the Swedish championships, Swedish indoor championships and Finland–Sweden Athletics International one time each. He has coached multiple pole vaulters belonging to the world elite.

== Active career ==
Hailing from Kalmar, he represented the club Kalmar SK, even when he moved across the country to Malmö to attend a sports secondary school. He then relocated to Gothenburg to train with Pekka Dalhöjd and joined the club Örgryte IS.

Hultgren broke the 5-metre barrier in 2001, and achieved 5.15 metres in the qualifying round at the 2002 World Junior Championships. He finished tenth in the final.

Having become Swedish junior champion and U23 champion, he finished fourth at the Swedish championships in 2003 and 2004. He moved his personal best up to 5.24 metres in 2004, 5.32 in the winter of 2005 and 5.35 in Karlskrona in 2005. He later repeated 5.35 at his first Finland–Sweden Athletics International, where he finished sixth. He also competed at the 2005 European U23 Championships without reaching the final.

In 2006 he jumped 5.40 in his first indoor competition, and took the bronze medal at the Swedish indoor championships. Following a fourth place at the 2006 Swedish championships in July, Hultgren's form surged and he cleared 5.56 metres in Karlskrona. A victory over Oscar Janson in a special meet at Ullevi Stadium entailed selection for the 2006 European Championships on the same stadium, Hultgren's home field in Gothenburg. Hultgren notably had to spend vacation days to take time off a seasonal job as lawnmower. He also spent the championship in his own house rather than residing in the Swedish athletes' hotel. His 5.55 metres in the qualifying round was enough for the final, where he cleared 5.50 to finish tenth. He then went on to win the Finland–Sweden International in 2006, achieving 5.50 metres. A victory for Sweden was regarded as surprising in the absence of Jeng, Kristiansson and Janson; however it was also described as a tactical victory as the best Finn Matti Mononen was moved to make attempts at a height that seemed to stress him.

In 2007 he finished second at the Swedish indoor championships, won the Swedish championships and finished third at the Finland–Sweden International. In 2008 he finished third, fourth and sixth in the respective contests. He won the 2009 Swedish indoor championships, took silver at the nationals and finished fifth at the Finland–Sweden International. Two silver medals and a sixth place was the result in 2010, with Hultgren also representing Sweden at the European Team Championships First League. His last two silver medals came at the 2011 Swedish championships and the 2012 Swedish indoor championships.

== Coaching career ==
Gustaf Hultgren became a coach in Gothenburg, among others with responsibility for Melker Svärd Jacobsson. He also coached William Asker (from the very start of Asker's pole vault career) and was a technique consultant for the Norwegian vaulter Sondre Guttormsen.

Hultgren coached female vaulter Michaela Meijer for several years. In the early summer of 2021, he also took on Meijer's domestic rival Angelica Bengtsson.

On 22 June 2021, a minivan with Hultgren, Meijer and another coach Yannick Tregaro was hit by a truck and flipped. Hultgren was the driver, but the car stood still in a parking shoulder. The accident happened between Årjäng and Säffle on the European route E18. Hultgren lost consciousness and was resuscitated by Meijer. Hultgren fractured every rib, had fractures in his jaw, shoulder, back and foot, a punctured lung and damaged spleen and liver. He underwent multiple surgeries at Sahlgrenska University Hospital, but was discharged on 1 July. He immediately returned to coaching. Melker Svärd Jacobsson, however, went through "hell" experiencing the accident as well as a failure to be selected by the Swedish Olympic Committee for the Olympics, and retired at the same time in July 2021.
