= 2010 IAAF World Indoor Championships – Men's pole vault =

The men's pole vault at the 2010 IAAF World Indoor Championships was held at the ASPIRE Dome on 12 and 13 March 2010.

The winning margin was 31 cm which as of July 2024 remains the only time the men's pole vault was won by more than 25 cm at these championships.

== Medalists ==
Gold	Silver	Bronze
Steven Hooker; Australia	Malte Mohr; Germany	Alexander Straub; Germany

== Records ==
Standing records prior to the 2010 IAAF World Indoor Championships
World record	Sergey Bubka (UKR)	6.15	Donetsk, Ukraine	21 February 1993
Championship record	Sergey Bubka (URS)	6.00	Seville, Spain	9 March 1991
Championship record	Jean Galfione (FRA)	6.00	Maebashi, Japan	6 March 1999
World Leading	Renaud Lavillenie (FRA)	5.85	Paris, France	28 February 2010
African record	Okkert Brits (RSA)	5.90	Liévin, France	16 February 1997
African record	Okkert Brits (RSA)	5.90	Toronto, Canada	1 June 1997
Asian record	Igor Potapovich (KAZ)	5.92	Stockholm, Sweden	19 February 1998
European record	Sergey Bubka (UKR)	6.15	Donetsk, Ukraine	21 February 1993
North and Central American and Caribbean record	Jeff Hartwig (USA)	6.02	Sindelfingen, Germany	10 March 2002
Oceanian Record	Steven Hooker (AUS)	6.06	Boston, United States	7 February 2009
South American record	Fábio Gomes da Silva (BRA)	5.61	Donetsk, Ukraine	16 February 2008
South American record	Fábio Gomes da Silva (BRA)	5.61	Stockholm, Sweden	21 February 2008

== Qualification standards ==
Indoor
5.70 m

== Schedule ==
Date	Time	Round
March 12, 2010	9:15	Qualification
March 13, 2010	16:15	Final

== Results ==
=== Qualification ===
Qualification: Qualifying Performance 5.75 (Q) or at least 8 best performers (q) advance to the final.

Rank	Athlete	Nationality	5.30	5.45	5.60	Result	Notes
1	Steven Hooker	Australia	-	-	o	5.60	q
1	Michal Balner	Czech Republic	-	o	o	5.60	q
1	Konstadinos Filippidis	Greece	o	o	o	5.60	q
1	Derek Miles	United States	-	o	o	5.60	q
5	Malte Mohr	Germany	-	xo	o	5.60	q
6	Dmitry Starodubtsev	Russia	o	-	xo	5.60	q
7	Alexander Straub	Germany	-	xo	xo	5.60	q
8	Łukasz Michalski	Poland	xxo	-	xo	5.60	q
9	Steven Lewis	Great Britain	xo	xxo	xxo	5.60	q
10	Renaud Lavillenie	France	-	o	xxx	5.45	
10	Giuseppe Gibilisco	Italy	-	o	xxx	5.45	
10	Kim Yoo-Suk	South Korea	o	o	xxx	5.45	
13	Aleksandr Gripich	Russia	xo	o	xxx	5.45	
DQ	Kevin Rans	Belgium	-	xo	xxx	~~5.45~~	Doping
14	Maksym Mazuryk	Ukraine	o	xo	xxx	5.45	
14	Timothy Mack	United States	-	xo	xxx	5.45	
16	Yang Yansheng	China	o	xxx		5.30	
17	Spas Bukhalov	Bulgaria	xxo	xxx		5.30	SB
17	Damiel Dossévi	France	xxo	xxx		5.30	

=== Final ===
Rank	Athlete	Nationality	5.45	5.55	5.65	5.70	5.75	5.80	5.85	6.01	6.16	Result	Notes
Gold medal	Steven Hooker	Australia	-	-	-	o	-	o	-	xxo	xxx	6.01	CR, WL
Silver medal	Malte Mohr	Germany	-	o	-	xo	-	-	xxx			5.70	
Bronze medal	Alexander Straub	Germany	o	-	o	xxx						5.65	
4	Konstadinos Filippidis	Greece	o	o	xxo	xxx						5.65	
4	Derek Miles	United States	o	-	xxo	xxx						5.65	
6	Michal Balner	Czech Republic	o	-	xxx							5.45	
6	Dmitry Starodubtsev	Russia	o	-	xxx							5.45	
6	Steven Lewis	Great Britain	o	-	xxx							5.45	
9	Łukasz Michalski	Poland	xo	-	xxx							5.45	
