= 2005 European Athletics Indoor Championships – Men's pole vault =

The Men's pole vault event at the 2005 European Athletics Indoor Championships was held on March 4–5.

== Medalists ==
Gold	Silver	Bronze
Igor Pavlov; Russia	Denys Yurchenko; Ukraine	Tim Lobinger; Germany

== Results ==
=== Qualification ===
Qualification: Qualification Performance 5.75 (Q) or at least 8 best performers advanced to the final.

Rank	Group	Athlete	Nationality	5.20	5.40	5.60	5.70	Result	Notes
1	A	Artyom Kuptsov	Russia	–	o	xo	o	5.70	q, PB
1	B	Igor Pavlov	Russia	–	o	xo	o	5.70	q
3	A	Tim Lobinger	Germany	–	xo	xxo	o	5.70	q
4	B	Alhaji Jeng	Sweden	–	o	o	xo	5.70	q
5	B	Denys Yurchenko	Ukraine	–	xo	xo	xo	5.70	q
6	B	Jean Galfione	France	–	xo	xxo	xo	5.70	q, =SB
7	B	Björn Otto	Germany	–	xo	o	xxo	5.70	q, =SB
8	A	Fabian Schulze	Germany	–	xo	xo	xxo	5.70	q, =PB
9	A	Spas Bukhalov	Bulgaria	–	o	o	xxx	5.60	
9	A	Konstadinos Filippidis	Greece	o	o	o	xxx	5.60	
11	A	Vesa Rantanen	Finland	–	xo	o	xxx	5.60	PB
11	A	Ruslan Yeremenko	Ukraine	–	xo	o	xxx	5.60	
13	B	Javier Sebastian Gazol	Spain	o	o	xo	xxx	5.60	PB
14	B	Mikko Latvala	Finland	–	xxo	xo	xxx	5.60	=SB
15	A	Nick Buckfield	Great Britain	–	o	xxx		5.40	
15	A	Jesper Fritz	Sweden	o	o	xxx		5.40	
15	A	Vladislav Revenko	Ukraine	o	o	xx–	x	5.40	
15	B	Ilian Efremov	Bulgaria	–	o	xxx		5.40	
15	B	Laurens Looije	Netherlands	o	o	xxx		5.40	
15	B	Kevin Rans	Belgium	–	o	xxx		5.40	
21	A	Igor Alekseev	Belarus	xxo	o	xxx		5.40	
22	A	Adam Kolasa	Poland	–	xo	xx–	x	5.40	
22	B	Damiel Dossevi	France	–	xo	xxx		5.40	
22	B	Dennis Kholev	Israel	–	xo	xxx		5.40	=SB
25	A	Vincent Favretto	France	o	xxx			5.20	
	B	Pavel Gerasimov	Russia	–	xxx			NM	

=== Final ===
Rank	Athlete	Nationality	5.40	5.50	5.60	5.70	5.75	5.80	5.85	5.90	5.95	6.00	Result	Notes
1st place, gold medalist(s)	Igor Pavlov	Russia	–	o	–	xo	o	o	xo	o	x–	x	5.90	WL, =CR
2nd place, silver medalist(s)	Denys Yurchenko	Ukraine	–	–	xo	–	o	–	xo	x–	xx		5.85	PB
3rd place, bronze medalist(s)	Tim Lobinger	Germany	–	o	–	xxo	–	o	x–	xx			5.80	SB
4	Björn Otto	Germany	o	–	xxo	o	xxx						5.70	=SB
5	Fabian Schulze	Germany	o	–	o	xxo	xxx						5.70	PB
6	Jean Galfione	France	o	–	o	–	xxx						5.60	
7	Artyom Kuptsov	Russia	o	–	xxo	xxx							5.60	
8	Alhaji Jeng	Sweden	–	xo	–	xxx							5.50	
