= 2009 World Championships in Athletics – Men's pole vault =

The Men's Pole Vault event at the 2009 World Championships in Berlin, Germany will be held between 20 August and 22 August 2009.

Reigning Olympic champion Steven Hooker came into the competition nursing a pulled hamstring incurred 12 days before the championships. Minimizing his effort, he only took one (successful) attempt in qualifying and two attempts in the final. Hooker waited until only three other competitors were left in the field. Hooker agonized in the pit after missing his attempt at 5.85, then watched Romain Mesnil clear. After one failure Renaud Lavillenie joined Hooker in passing to the next height while Maksym Mazuryk, who had passed to get to 5.85 exhausted his attempts. Constantly stretching and massaging his hamstring, Hooker successfully cleared 5.90 with room to spare, leaping from nothing to first place. Mesnil and Lavillenie could not answer.

== Medalists ==
Gold	Steven Hooker; Australia (AUS)
Silver	Romain Mesnil; France (FRA)
Bronze	Renaud Lavillenie; France (FRA)

== Records ==
World record	Sergey Bubka (UKR)	6.14	Sestriere, Italy	31 July 1994
Championship record	Dmitri Markov (AUS)	6.05	Edmonton, Canada	9 August 2001
World Leading	Renaud Lavillenie (FRA)	6.01	Leiria, Portugal	21 June 2009
African record	Okkert Brits (RSA)	6.03	Cologne, Germany	18 August 1995
Asian record	Grigoriy Yegorov (KAZ)	5.90	Stuttgart, Germany	19 August 1993
North American record	Brad Walker (USA)	6.04	Eugene, United States	8 June 2008
South American record	Fábio Gomes da Silva (BRA)	5.77	São Paulo, Brazil	7 June 2007
European record	Sergey Bubka (UKR)	6.14	Sestriere, Italy	31 July 1994
Oceanian record	Dmitri Markov (AUS)	6.05	Edmonton, Canada	9 August 2001

== Qualification standards ==
A standard	B standard
5.70m	5.55m

== Schedule ==
Date	Time	Round
August 20, 2009	10:10	Qualification
August 22, 2009	18:15	Final

== Results ==
=== Qualification ===
Qualification: Qualifying Performance 5.75 (Q) or at least 12 best performers (q) advance to the final.

Rank	Group	Name	Nationality	5.25	5.40	5.55	5.65	Result	Notes
1	A	Steven Hooker	Australia	-	-	-	o	5.65	q
1	B	Renaud Lavillenie	France	-	o	o	o	5.65	q
1	B	Alexander Straub	Germany	-	-	o	o	5.65	q
4	A	Romain Mesnil	France	-	-	xo	o	5.65	q
4	A	Maksym Mazuryk	Ukraine	-	o	xo	o	5.65	q
6	A	Damiel Dossévi	France	-	o	o	xo	5.65	q
7	A	Giuseppe Gibilisco	Italy	-	o	o	xxo	5.65	q
8	A	Malte Mohr	Germany	-	-	xo	xxo	5.65	q
8	A	Aleksandr Gripich	Russia	o	o	xo	xxo	5.65	q
8	B	Steven Lewis	Great Britain & N.I.	-	o	xo	xxo	5.65	q
11	B	Alhaji Jeng	Sweden	-	xo	xxo	xxo	5.65	q, SB
12	A	Derek Miles	United States	-	-	o	xxx	5.55	q
12	B	Kevin Rans	Belgium	-	o	o	xxx	5.55	q
12	B	Daichi Sawano	Japan	-	-	o	xxx	5.55	q
12	B	Viktor Chistiakov	Russia	-	-	o	xxx	5.55	q
14	A	Jeremy Scott	United States	-	o	xo	xxx	5.55	
15	A	Konstadinos Filippidis	Greece	o	o	xxo	xxx	5.55	
16	A	Kim Yoo-Suk	South Korea	xo	o	xxo	xxx	5.55	SB
16	A	Igor Pavlov	Russia	-	xo	xxo	xxx	5.55	
16	B	Björn Otto	Germany	-	xo	xxo	xxx	5.55	
19	B	Leonid Andreev	Uzbekistan	xxo	o	xxo	xxx	5.55	
20	B	Eemeli Salomäki	Finland	o	o	xxx		5.40	
20	B	Łukasz Michalski	Poland	-	o	xxx		5.40	
22	A	Spas Bukhalov	Bulgaria	-	xo	-	xxx	5.40	
22	A	Jan Kudlička	Czech Republic	-	xo	xxx		5.40	
22	A	Luke Cutts	Great Britain & N.I.	-	xo	xxx		5.40	
22	B	Toby Stevenson	United States	-	xo	xxx		5.40	
26	A	Yavgeniy Olhovsky	Israel	xo	xo	xxx		5.40	
26	B	Jurij Rovan	Slovenia	xo	xo	xxx		5.40	
28	B	Denys Fedas	Ukraine	o	xxx			5.25	
29	A	Takafumi Suzuki	Japan	o	xxx			5.25	
	A	Jesper Fritz	Sweden	-	x			NM	
	B	Fábio Gomes da Silva	Brazil	-	xxx			NM	
	B	Oleksandr Korchmid	Ukraine	-	xxx			NM	
	B	Brad Walker	United States					DNS	

Key: NM = no mark (i.e. no valid result), NR = National record, q = qualification by overall place, SB = Seasonal best

=== Final ===
Rank	Name	Nationality	5.50	5.65	5.75	5.80	5.85	5.90	5.95	Result	Notes
1st place, gold medalist(s)	Steven Hooker	Australia	-	-	-	-	x-	o	-	5.90	
2nd place, silver medalist(s)	Romain Mesnil	France	o	o	x-	o	o	x-	xx	5.85	SB
3rd place, bronze medalist(s)	Renaud Lavillenie	France	o	o	xxo	o	x-	x-	x	5.80	
4	Maksym Mazuryk	Ukraine	o	xo	o	x-	xx			5.75	
5	Aleksandr Gripich	Russia	o	xxo	o	xxx				5.75	PB
6	Damiel Dossévi	France	o	o	xo	xxx				5.75	PB
7	Alexander Straub	Germany	xo	xo	xxx					5.65	
7	Giuseppe Gibilisco	Italy	xo	xo	xx-	x				5.65	
7	Steven Lewis	Great Britain & N.I.	xo	xo	xxx					5.65	
10	Daichi Sawano	Japan	o	xxx						5.50	
10	Viktor Chistiakov	Russia	o	xxx						5.50	
12	Alhaji Jeng	Sweden	xo	xxx						5.50	
12	Kevin Rans	Belgium	xo	xxx						5.50	
14	Malte Mohr	Germany	xxo	xxx						5.50	
	Derek Miles	United States	xxx							NM	
