= 2011 European Athletics Indoor Championships – Men's pole vault =

The Men's pole vault event at the 2011 European Athletics Indoor Championships was held at March 4–5, 2011 with the final being held on March 5 at 15:45 local time.

== Records ==
Standing records prior to the 2011 European Athletics Indoor Championships
World record	Sergey Bubka (UKR)	6.15	Donetsk, Ukraine	21 February 1993
European record	Sergey Bubka (UKR)	6.15	Donetsk, Ukraine	21 February 1993
Championship record	Pyotr Bochkaryov (RUS)	5.90	Paris, France	12 March 1994
Championship record	Igor Pavlov (RUS)	5.90	Madrid, Spain	5 March 2005
World Leading	Renaud Lavillenie (FRA)	5.93	Donetsk, Ukraine	12 February 2011
European Leading	Renaud Lavillenie (FRA)	5.93	Donetsk, Ukraine	12 February 2011

== Results ==
=== Qualification ===
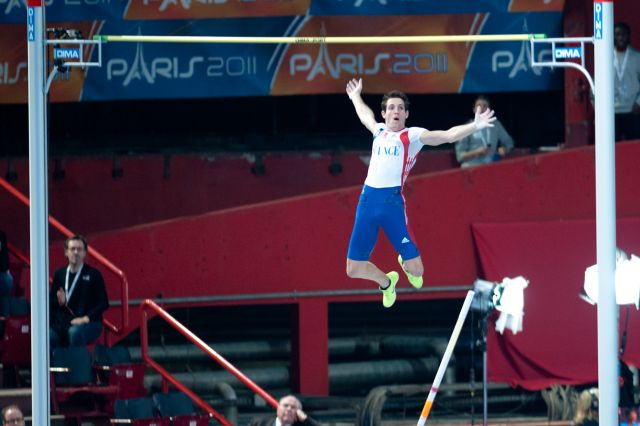
Lavillenie on his way to gold.

Qualification: Qualification Performance 5.75 (Q) or at least 8 best performers advanced to the final. It was held at 16:15.

Rank	Athlete	Nationality	5.00	5.20	5.40	5.55	5.65	Result	Notes
1	Renaud Lavillenie	France	–	–	–	o	o	5.65	q
1	Tim Lobinger	Germany	–	–	o	o	o	5.65	q, SB
1	Paweł Wojciechowski	Poland	–	–	o	o	o	5.65	q
4	Jérôme Clavier	France	–	–	o	xo	o	5.65	q
4	Malte Mohr	Germany	–	–	o	xo	o	5.65	q
6	Igor Pavlov	Russia	–	–	o	xo	xo	5.65	q
7	Konstadinos Filippidis	Greece	–	o	o	xo	xxo	5.65	q
8	Fabian Schulze	Germany	–	–	o	o	xxx	5.55	q
9	Maksym Mazuryk	Ukraine	–	–	xo	o	xxx	5.55	
10	Alhaji Jeng	Sweden	–	o	xxo	o	xxx	5.55	=SB
11	Damiel Dossévi	France	–	–	–	xxo	xxx	5.55	
11	Dmitriy Starodubtsev	Russia	–	–	o	xxo	xxx	5.55	
13	Jere Bergius	Finland	–	–	xo	xxx		5.40	
13	Claudio Michel Stecchi	Italy	–	o	xo	xxx		5.40	
15	Giorgio Piantella	Italy	–	xo	xxo	xxx		5.40	
16	Edi Maia	Portugal	xo	o	xxx			5.20	
	Giuseppe Gibilisco	Italy	–	–	–	xxx		NM	

=== Final ===
The final was held at 15:45.

Rank	Athlete	Nationality	5.41	5.51	5.61	5.71	5.76	5.81	5.91	6.03	6.16	Result	Notes
1st place, gold medalist(s)	Renaud Lavillenie	France	-	-	xo	o	-	o	xxo	o	xxx	6.03	WL, NR, CR
2nd place, silver medalist(s)	Jérôme Clavier	France	o	-	o	o	xo	xxx				5.76	
3rd place, bronze medalist(s)	Malte Mohr	Germany	-	xo	-	xo	-	xxx				5.71	
4	Paweł Wojciechowski	Poland	-	xxo	-	xo	xxx					5.71	
5	Konstadinos Filippidis	Greece	xo	o	o	x-	xx					5.61	
6	Fabian Schulze	Germany	-	o	xxx							5.51	
7	Igor Pavlov	Russia	-	xo	-	xx-	x					5.51	
8	Tim Lobinger	Germany	o	-	xxx							5.41	
