= Fabian Schulze =

German pole vaulter (1984–2024)

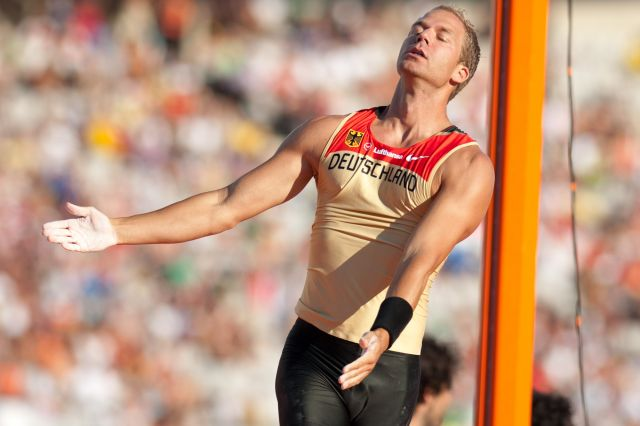
Schulze during 2010 European Athletics Championships

Fabian Schulze (7 March 1984 – 25 February 2024) was a German pole vaulter.

== Biography ==
Fabian Schulze was born 7 March 1984 in Filderstadt, Baden-Württemberg. He finished fifth at the 2005 European Indoor Athletics Championships in Madrid and fourth at the 2006 IAAF World Indoor Championships in Moscow and the 2006 IAAF World Athletics Final in Stuttgart.

His personal best jump was 5.81 metres, achieved in July 2006 in Ingolstadt. This ranks him tenth among German pole vaulters, behind Björn Otto, Danny Ecker, Tim Lobinger, Raphael Holzdeppe, Andrei Tivontchik, Michael Stolle, Malte Mohr, Richard Spiegelburg, and Lars Börgeling.

Schulze died in Sonthofen on 25 February 2024 at the age of 39, from what was described as an "insidious disease".

== Competition record ==
Year	Competition	Venue	Position	Notes
Representing Germany
2003	European Junior Championships	Tampere, Finland	3rd	5.40 m
2005	European Indoor Championships	Madrid, Spain	5th	5.70 m
2005	European U23 Championships	Erfurt, Germany	2nd	5.65 m
2006	World Indoor Championships	Moscow, Russia	4th	5.50 m
2008	World Indoor Championships	Valencia, Spain	–	NM
2010	European Championships	Barcelona, Spain	6th	5.70 m
2011	European Indoor Championships	Paris, France	6th	5.51 m

== See also ==
- Germany all-time top lists - Pole vault
