= Revenco =

Revenco (Ukrainian: Ревенко) is a Romanian surname of Ukrainian origin. Notable people with the surname include:

- Ana Revenco (born 1977), Moldovan politician
- Ioan-Călin Revenco (born 2000), Moldovan footballer
- Valerian Revenco (born 1939, died 2016), Moldovan politician
