= Adam Kolasa =

Polish pole vaulter

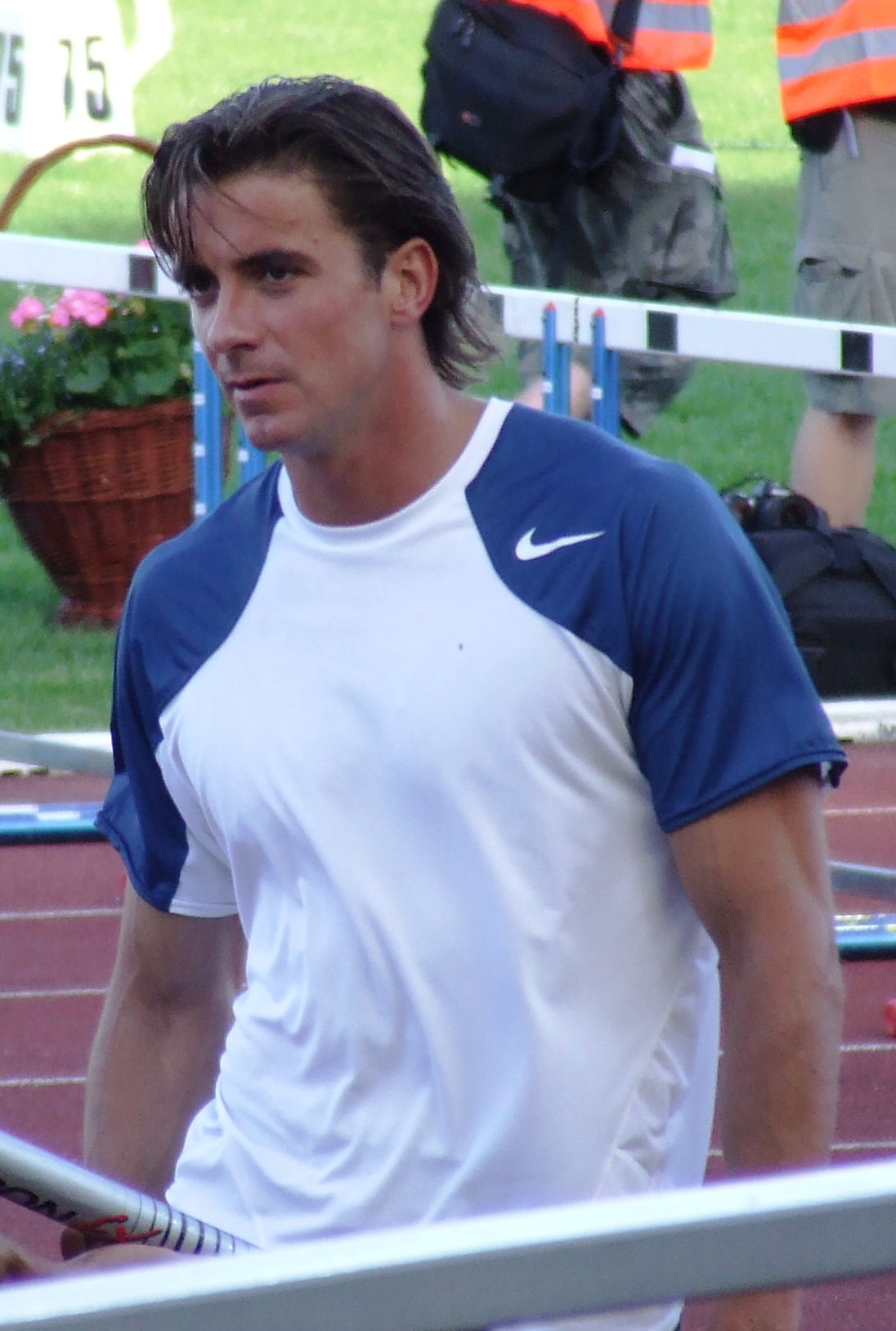
Adam Kolasa in 2007

Adam Kolasa (born 2 August 1975 in Gdańsk, Pomorskie) is a retired Polish pole vaulter.

He finished eighth at the 2001 World Championships in Edmonton in a personal best of 5.75 metres, won the 2001 Jeux de la Francophonie, finished fourth at the 2002 European Indoor Championships in Vienna and ninth at the 2003 World Championships in Paris. Participating at the 2004 Olympics, he failed to qualify from his pool.

His older brothers, Marian and Ryszard, were also pole vaulters.

== Major competitions record ==
Year	Competition	Venue	Position	Notes
Representing Poland
1994	World Junior Championships	Lisbon, Portugal	7th	5.10 m
2001	Jeux de la Francophonie	Ottawa, Canada	1st	5.60 m
2001	World Championships	Edmonton, Canada	8th	5.75 m (PB)
2002	European Indoor Championships	Vienna, Austria	4th	5.70 m (=iPB)
2003	World Championships	Paris, France	9th	5.70 m
2004	Olympic Games	Athens, Greece	31st (q)	5.30 m
2005	European Indoor Championships	Madrid, Spain	22nd (q)	5.40 m
2007	European Indoor Championships	Birmingham, United Kingdom	16th (q)	5.40 m
2009	European Indoor Championships	Turin, Italy	17th (q)	5.20 m
