= Alberto Giacchetto =

Italian pole vaulter (born 1973)

Personal information
- Nationality: Italian
- Born: February 21, 1973 (age 53) Padua, Italy

Sport
- Country: Italy
- Sport: Athletics
- Event: Pole vault
- Club: G.S. Fiamme Gialle

Achievements and titles
- Personal bests: Pole vault outdoor: 5.60 (1993); Pole vault indoor: 5.65 (1998)
Medal record
Summer Universiade
Silver medal – second place	1993 Buffalo	Pole vault

Alberto Giacchetto (born 21 February 1973 in Padua) is a former Italian pole vaulter.

He won one medal at senior level at the International athletics competitions. He received a doping ban in 1993 after testing positive for metandienone and stated that he would leave athletics regardless, as he was disgusted with it.

In his early twenties, he returned after disqualification to jump a personal best of 5.65 m in 1998. Abandoned his career as an athlete, he dedicated himself to masters athletics.

== Achievements ==
Year	Competition	Venue	Position	Notes
Representing Italy
1992	World Junior Championships	Seoul, South Korea	13th	4.80 m
1993	Summer Universiade	Buffalo, United States	2nd	5.60 m

== See also ==
- Italian all-time lists - Pole vault
- Italy at the 1993 Summer Universiade
