= Alexander Straub =

German pole vaulter

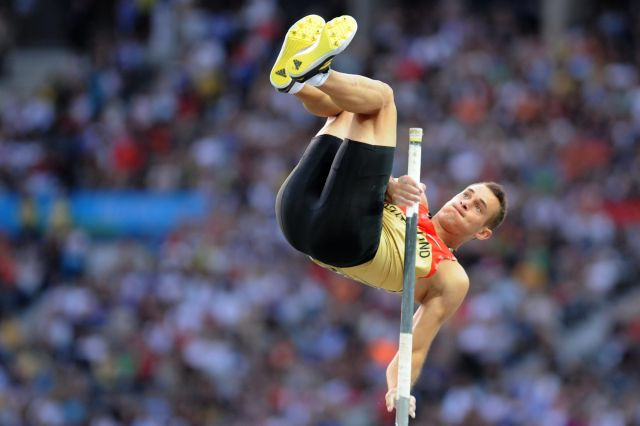
- Alexander Straub at the 2009 World Championships in Berlin.

Medal record

Men's athletics

Representing Germany

World Indoor Championships
Bronze medal – third place	2010 Doha	Pole vault

Alexander Straub (born 14 October 1983 in Geislingen an der Steige) is a German pole vaulter. He earned a bronze medal at the 2010 World Indoor Championships in Doha.

Straub set his personal best (5.81 metres) on 1 August 2008 in Bochum.

== Achievements ==
Year	Competition	Venue	Position	Notes
2002	World Junior Championships	Kingston, Jamaica	13th (q)	5.05 m
2005	European U23 Championships	Erfurt, Germany	10th	5.40 m
2007	Universiade	Bangkok, Thailand	1st	5.60 m
2009	European Indoor Championships	Turin, Italy	3rd	5.76 m
2009	World Championships	Berlin, Germany	7th	5.65 m
2010	World Indoor Championships	Doha, Qatar	3rd	5.65 m
