= José Manuel Arcos =

Spanish pole vaulter

Personal information
- Born: 19 January 1973 (age 53) Valladolid, Spain

Sport
- Sport: Track and field

José Manuel Arcos Gil (born 19 January 1973) is a retired Spanish pole vaulter.

His personal best jump was 5.76 metres, achieved in June 1996 in Madrid. He had 5.80 metres on the indoor track, achieved in February 1999 in Zaragoza.

== Achievements ==
Year	Competition	Venue	Position	Event	Notes
Representing Spain
1992	World Junior Championships	Seoul, South Korea	7th (q)	Pole vault	5.00 m^{1}
1993	Universiade	Buffalo, United States	4th	Pole vault	5.50 m
1993	World Championships	Stuttgart, Germany	–	Pole vault	NM
1995	World Indoor Championships	Barcelona, Spain	5th	Pole vault	5.70 m
1995	World Championships	Gothenburg, Sweden	–	Pole vault	NM
1995	Universiade	Fukuoka, Japan	6th	Pole vault	5.30 m
1996	Olympic Games	Atlanta, United States	15th (q)	Pole vault	5.60 m
1999	World Indoor Championships	Maebashi, Japan	4th	Pole vault	5.70 m
1999	Universiade	Palma, Spain	–	Pole vault	NM
1999	World Championships	Seville, Spain	17th (q)	Pole vault	5.55 m

^{1}No mark in the final
