= Laurens Looije =

Dutch pole vaulter

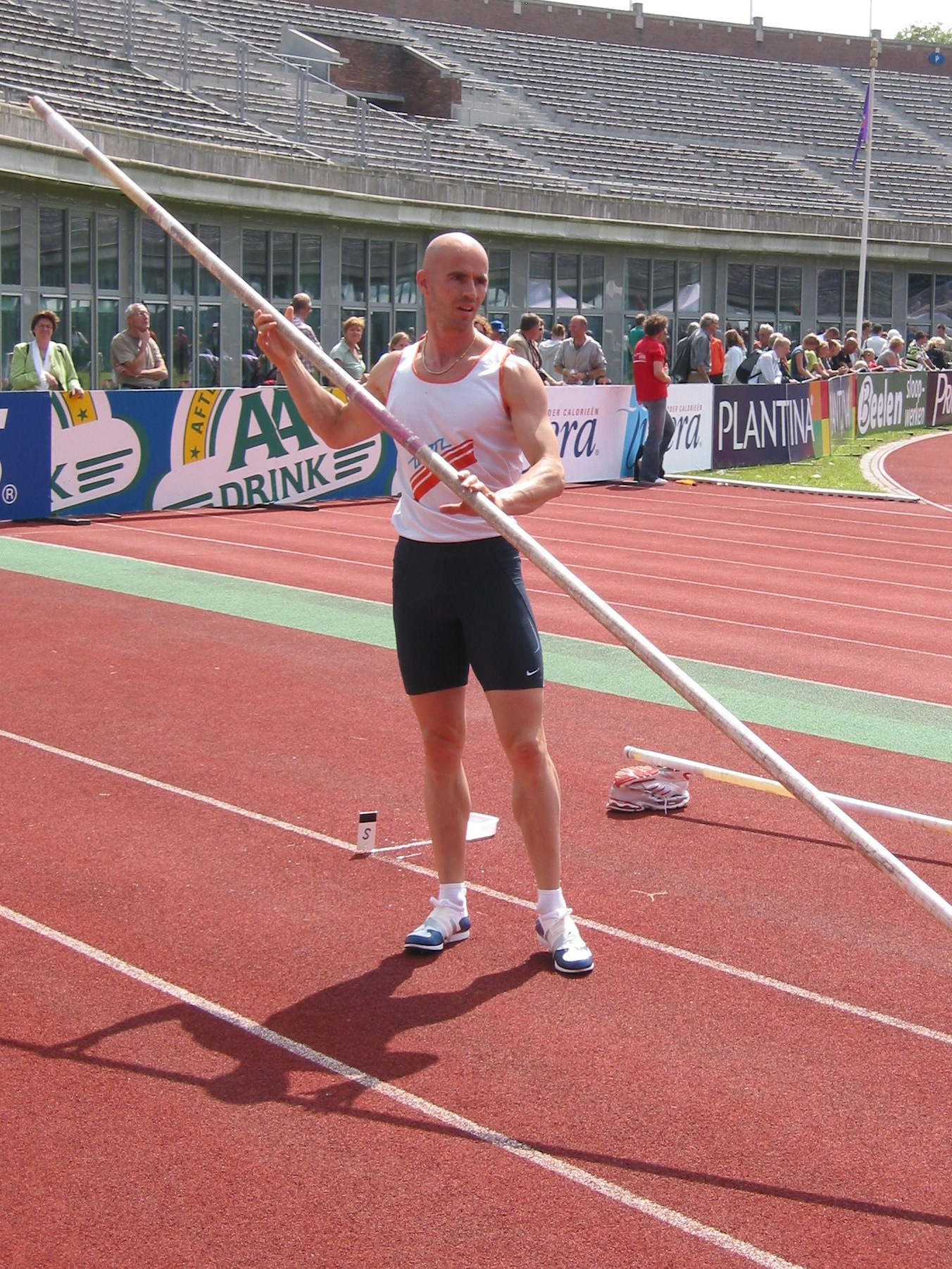

Personal information
- Full name: Laurens Christiaan Looije
- Born: 12 January 1973 (age 53) The Hague, Netherlands
- Years active: 1986-present
- Height: 1.85 m (6 ft 1 in)
- Weight: 80 kg (176 lb)

Achievements and titles
- Personal best: pole vault - 5.71 (1998)
Medal record
Representing Netherlands
Summer Universiade
Bronze medal – third place	2001 Beijing	Pole vault
World Junior Championships
Gold medal – first place	1992 Seoul	Pole vault
- Updated on 18 October 2007

Laurens Christiaan Looije (born January 12, 1973) is a Dutch pole vaulter, who represented his native country at the 1996 Summer Olympics in Atlanta, United States.

Looije finished 8th in the pole vault final at the 2006 European Athletics Championships in Gothenburg. He was also the 1992 World Junior champion, and won a bronze medal at the 2001 Summer Universiade.

His personal best is 5.71 metres, achieved in August 1998 in Hechtel. He is a five times outdoor and nine times indoor Dutch national champion.

== Achievements ==
Year	Competition	Venue	Position	Notes
Representing the Netherlands
1991	European Junior Championships	Thessaloniki, Greece	10th	4.90 m
1992	World Junior Championships	Seoul, South Korea	1st	5.45 m
1993	World Indoor Championships	Toronto, Canada	18th (q)	5.30 m
1996	European Indoor Championships	Stockholm, Sweden	14th (q)	5.45 m
1996	Olympic Games	Atlanta, United States	23rd (q)	5.40 m
1997	World Championships	Athens, Greece	27th (q)	5.30 m
1998	European Championships	Budapest, Hungary	10th	5.40 m
2000	European Indoor Championships	Ghent, Belgium	13th (q)	5.20 m
2001	Universiade	Beijing, PR China	3rd	5.60 m
2005	European Indoor Championships	Madrid, Spain	15th (q)	5.40 m
2006	World Indoor Championships	Moscow, Russia	14th (q)	5.45 m
2006	European Championships	Gothenburg, Sweden	8th	5.50 m
