= Łukasz Michalski =

Polish pole vaulter

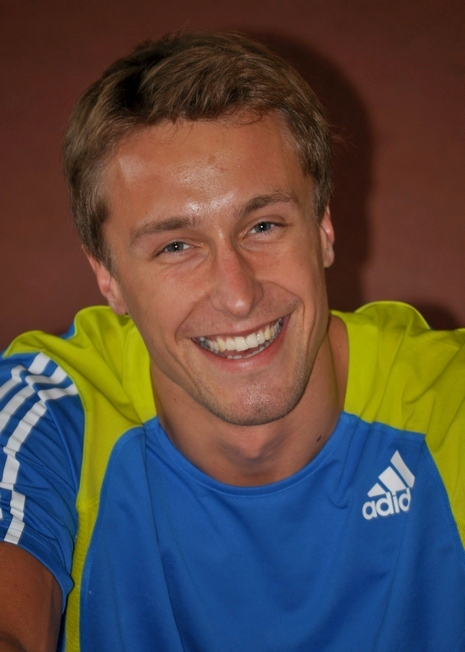
- Łukasz Michalski in 2010

Personal information
- Nationality: Poland
- Born: 2 August 1988 (age 38) Bydgoszcz, Poland
- Height: 1.90 m (6 ft 3 in)
- Weight: 85 kg (187 lb) (2012)

Sport
- Sport: Athletics
- Event: Pole vault
- Club: Zawisza Bydgoszcz
Medal record
European Team Championships
Bronze medal – third place	2009 Leiria	Pole vault
Universiade
Gold medal – first place	2011 Shenzhen	Pole vault

Łukasz Michalski (born 2 August 1988 in Bydgoszcz) is a retired Polish pole vaulter. His biggest achievement is the fourth place at the 2011 World Championships in Daegu with the personal best of 5.85 metres. He also won the gold medal at the 2011 Summer Universiade and was a finalist at the 2012 Summer Olympics in London.

In July 2014, he married Polish triple jumper Anna Jagaciak. Michalski officially ended his sporting career in 2015 to concentrate on his work as a doctor.

== Achievements ==
Year	Competition	Venue	Position	Notes
Representing Poland
2005	World Youth Championships	Marrakesh, Morocco	4th	5.15 m
2006	World Junior Championships	Beijing, China	8th	5.30 m
2007	European Junior Championships	Hengelo, Netherlands	3rd	5.45 m
2009	European Indoor Championships	Turin, Italy	6th	5.61 m
2009	European Team Championships	Leiria, Portugal	3rd	5.70 m
2009	European U23 Championships	Kaunas, Lithuania	5th	5.50 m
2009	World Championships	Berlin, Germany	20th (q)	5.40 m
2010	World Indoor Championships	Doha, Qatar	9th	5.45 m
2010	European Championships	Barcelona, Spain	7th	5.65 m
2011	Universiade	Shenzhen, China	1st	5.75 m
2011	World Championships	Daegu, South Korea	4th	5.85 m (PB)
2012	Olympic Games	London, United Kingdom	11th	5.50 m
