= Christian Tamminga =

Dutch pole vaulter

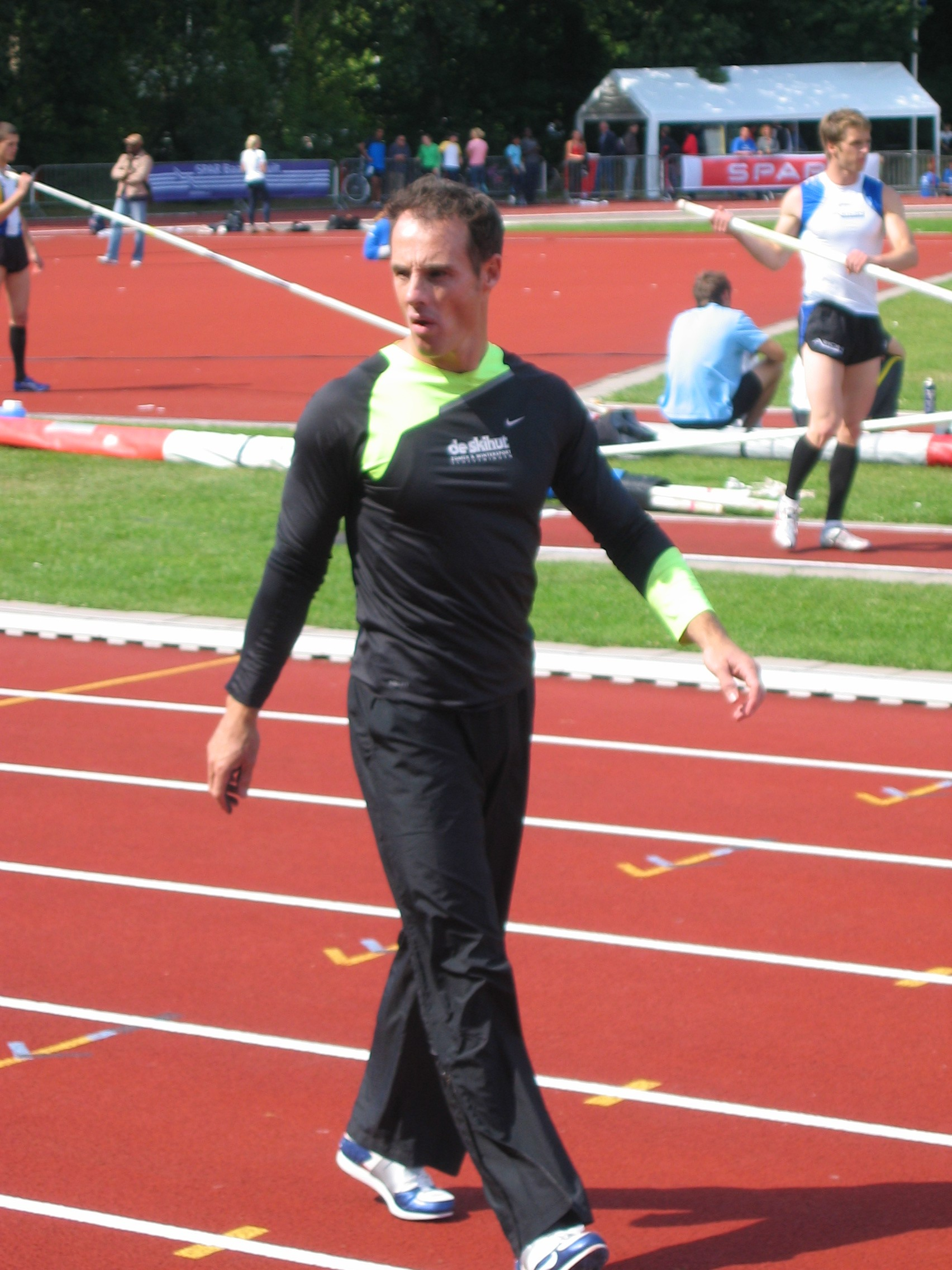
- Christian Tamminga in 2008

Personal information
- Born: 30 April 1974 (age 52) Leiden, Netherlands

Sport
- Sport: Track and field

Christian Tamminga (born 30 April 1974) is a retired Dutch athlete who specialised in the pole vault. His biggest success was the sixth place at the 2001 World Championships.

His personal bests in the event are 5.76 metres outdoors (1998) and 5.60 metres indoors (2002).

After retiring, he started a company manufacturing athletics equipment.

== Competition record ==
Year	Competition	Venue	Position	Event	Notes
Representing the Netherlands
1992	World Junior Championships	Seoul, South Korea	10th	Pole vault	5.00 m
1993	European Junior Championships	San Sebastián, Spain	5th	Pole vault	5.25 m
1995	Universiade	Fukuoka, Japan	5th (q)	Pole vault	5.30 m^{1}
1996	European Indoor Championships	Stockholm, Sweden	19th (q)	Pole vault	5.20 m
1998	European Championships	Budapest, Hungary	11th	Pole vault	5.40 m
2001	World Championships	Edmonton, Canada	6th	Pole vault	5.75 m
2001	Goodwill Games	Brisbane, Australia	5th	Pole vault	5.60 m
2002	European Indoor Championships	Vienna, Austria	–	Pole vault	NM
2003	World Championships	Paris, France	23rd (q)	Pole vault	5.35 m
2006	European Championships	Gothenburg, Sweden	15th	Pole vault	5.40 m

^{1}No mark in the final
