= Jesper Fritz =

Swedish pole vaulter (born 1985)

Jesper Fritz (born 13 September 1985) is a Swedish pole vaulter and physician.

== Early life and career ==
He grew up in Bellevue, Malmö, represented the club Malmö AI and was coached by Stanislaw Szczyrba. Having jumped 4.90 metres in 2002, he cleared 5 metres in 2003 followed by 5.45 in 2004 and 5.55 in 2005. He finished eighth at the 2003 European Junior Championships, fifth at the 2004 World Junior Championships and eighth at the 2005 European U23 Championships. He also competed at the 2005 European Indoor Championships without reaching the final.

Jesper Fritz also got the highest possible grades in secondary school, prompting him to study medicine at Lund University.

== International career ==
Having cleared 5.55 in February 2005, his results were below that in the following 17 months, until Fritz made his senior breakthrough in Sweden when finishing second at the national championships in 2006, clearing 5.60 metres. This also qualified him for the 2006 European Championships on home soil, where he was eliminated in the qualification.

The next year he repeated 5.60 in June before entering the 2007 European U23 Championships. He heightened his personal best with 10 centimetres to 5.70 metres, which was enough for a silver medal. He thereby also qualified for the 2007 World Championships. However, shortly after he sustained a strained thigh, which did not heal in time for the World Championships. He did not enter the Swedish Championships either.

In 2008 he notably jumped 5.62 and 5.63 on the summer meet circuit in Karlskrona and Sollentuna, before winning the Swedish Championships at 5.61 metres. He was granted a berth on the Swedish Olympic team. He however competed at the 2008 Olympic Games, as well as the 2008 World Indoor Championships, without reaching the final.

He won the Finland–Sweden Athletics International in 2008, having finished second in 2006. Fritz was also given the green light for the 2009 World Championships. At the 2009 DN-Galan, he did achieve a season's best of 5.61 metres, which was good in itself, but a commentator opined that it would probably not be enough to excel at the World Championships. In the build up to the Worlds, Fritz chose to pass the Swedish Championships, as did Alhaji Jeng who had an equal season's best at the time. The 2009 World Championships ended in Fritz failing the first height.

Fritz lost the entire 2010 indoor season to injury, which remained problematic in the outdoor season, which he had to sit out as well.

== Later career ==
At the 2012 Summer Olympics, the Swedish hopeful Angelica Bengtsson had recently taken on Miro Zalar as her coach. As Zalar had a previous engagement as radio commentator during the Olympics, Jesper Fritz would be the accredited coach who would help Bengtsson on the field. He also spent time mentoring Melker Svärd-Jacobsson.

Following several years without being able to resume competitions on a high level, Fritz announced his retirement from pole vaulting in October 2013.

His doctoral dissertation in medicine at Lund University was titled Physical Activity During Growth. Effects on Bone, Muscle, Fracture Risk and Academic Performance. Fritz found positive effects from physical activity on boys' school performance.
