= Athletics at the 2005 Summer Universiade – Men's pole vault =

The men's pole vault event at the 2005 Summer Universiade was held on 16–18 August in İzmir, Turkey.

== Medalists ==
Gold	Silver	Bronze
Björn Otto; Germany	Konstadinos Filippidis; Greece	Oleksandr Korchmid; Ukraine

== Results ==
=== Qualification ===
Rank	Group	Athlete	Nationality	5.00	5.20	5.30	Result	Notes
1	A	Dmitriy Kuptsov	Russia				5.30	Q
1	A	Björn Otto	Germany				5.30	Q
1	A	Robbie Pratt	Mexico				5.30	Q
1	A	Fábio Gomes da Silva	Brazil				5.30	Q
1	B	Przemysław Czerwiński	Poland				5.30	Q
1	B	Oleksandr Korchmid	Ukraine				5.30	Q
1	B	Mikko Latvala	Finland	–	–	o	5.30	Q
1	B	Pierre-Charles Peuf	France				5.30	Q
1	B	Dmitry Starodubtsev	Russia				5.30	Q
10	A	Konstadinos Filippidis	Greece				5.30	Q
11	A	Fabian Mores	Luxembourg				5.30	Q
12	B	Richard Spiegelburg	Germany				5.30	Q
13	B	Olivier Frey	Switzerland				5.30	Q
14	A	Jason Wurster	Canada				5.20	
15	B	Aleksandr Akhmedov	Kazakhstan				5.20	
16	B	Robert Hanson	Canada				5.20	=PB
17	A	Jure Batagelj	Slovenia				5.00	
17	B	Jacobus Nel	New Zealand				5.00	
	A	Kim Yoo-Suk	South Korea				NM	
	?	Nunung Nunung	Indonesia				NM	
	?	Abdullah Sari	Turkey				DNS	
	?	Ahud Kamni	Israel				DNS	

=== Final ===
Rank	Athlete	Nationality	5.00	5.10	5.20	5.30	5.40	5.45	5.50	5.55	5.60	5.65	5.70	5.75	5.80	5.85	Result	Notes
1st place, gold medalist(s)	Björn Otto	Germany	–	–	–	–	o	–	–	–	o	–	o	–	xxo	xxx	5.80	=GR, SB
2nd place, silver medalist(s)	Konstadinos Filippidis	Greece	–	–	o	–	o	–	–	xxo	–	xo	–	xo	xxx		5.75	NR
3rd place, bronze medalist(s)	Oleksandr Korchmid	Ukraine	–	–	–	–	o	–	–	o	xxo	–	xo	xxx			5.70	
4	Richard Spiegelburg	Germany	–	–	–	o	–	–	–	o	o	–	xx–	x			5.60	
5	Przemysław Czerwiński	Poland	–	–	o	–	xxo	–	o	–	xxx						5.50	
6	Mikko Latvala	Finland	–	–	–	xxo	–	–	xo	–	–	xxx					5.50	
7	Dmitry Starodubtsev	Russia	–	–	xo	o	xxo	–	xo	xx–	x						5.50	=SB
8	Olivier Frey	Switzerland	–	xo	–	xo	–	o	x–	xx							5.45	SB
9	Dmitriy Kuptsov	Russia	–	–	o	–	o	–	–	–	xx–	–	x				5.40	
10	Pierre-Charles Peuf	France	–	–	o	–	xxx										5.20	
11	Fábio Gomes da Silva	Brazil	–	–	xo	–	xxx										5.20	
12	Fabian Mores	Luxembourg	o	–	xxo	–	xxx										5.20	
	Robbie Pratt	Mexico	–	–	xxx												NM	
