= 2014 IAAF World Indoor Championships – Men's pole vault =

The men's pole vault at the 2014 IAAF World Indoor Championships took place on 8 March 2014. The best vaulter of the 2014 indoor season, France's Renaud Lavillenie did not compete at Sopot after suffering a foot injury shortly after he set a new world record of 6.16 metres on 15 February at Donetsk, Ukraine.

The gold and silver medallists both achieved the same height (5.80 metres). As of July 2024 this is the only time this has happened in the men's pole vault at these championships.

== Medalists ==
Gold	Silver	Bronze
Konstadinos Filippidis; Greece	Malte Mohr; Germany	Jan Kudlička; Czech Republic

== Records ==
Standing records prior to the 2014 IAAF World Indoor Championships
World record	Renaud Lavillenie (FRA)	6.16	Donetsk, Ukraine	15 February 2014
Championship record	Steven Hooker (AUS)	6.01	Doha, Qatar	13 March 2010
World Leading	Renaud Lavillenie (FRA)	6.16	Donetsk, Ukraine	15 February 2014
African record	Okkert Brits (RSA)	5.90	Liévin, France	16 February 1997
African record	Okkert Brits (RSA)	5.90	Toronto, Canada	1 June 1997
Asian record	Igor Potapovich (KAZ)	5.92	Stockholm, Sweden	19 February 1998
European record	Renaud Lavillenie (FRA)	6.16	Donetsk, Ukraine	15 February 2014
North and Central American and Caribbean record	Jeff Hartwig (USA)	6.02	Sindelfingen, Germany	10 March 2002
Oceanian Record	Steven Hooker (AUS)	6.06	Boston, United States	7 February 2009
South American record	Thiago Braz (BRA)	5.76	Donetsk, Ukraine	14 February 2014

== Qualification standards ==
Indoor	Outdoor
5.75

== Schedule ==
Date	Time	Round
8 March 2014	18:00	Final

== Results ==
Rank	Name	Nationality	5.40	5.55	5.65	5.75	5.80	5.85	Result	Notes
1st place, gold medalist(s)	Konstadinos Filippidis	Greece	o	o	o	o	o	xxx	5.80	SB
2nd place, silver medalist(s)	Malte Mohr	Germany	–	o	o	o	xo	xxx	5.80	
3rd place, bronze medalist(s)	Jan Kudlička	Czech Republic	o	–	o	xxo	xxo	xxx	5.80	PB
4	Thiago Braz da Silva	Brazil	–	xxo	o	xo	xxx		5.75	
5	Xue Changrui	China	xxo	xxo	xo	xo	xxx		5.75	
6	Robert Sobera	Poland	o	xo	o	x–	xx		5.65	
7	Augusto de Oliveira	Brazil	o	xo	xxo	xxx			5.65	SB
8	Luke Cutts	Great Britain	xxo	xo	xxo	xxx			5.65	
9	Yang Yansheng	China	o	o	xx–	x			5.55	
10	Jérôme Clavier	France	o	xo	xxx				5.55	
11	Kévin Menaldo	France	o	xxo	xxx				5.55	
12	Paweł Wojciechowski	Poland	o	xxx					5.40	
