= Artyom Kuptsov =

Russian pole vaulter (born 1984)

Artyom Kuptsov (Russian: Артём Купцов, born 22 April 1984) is a Russian pole vaulter.

== Career ==
As a junior, he won the gold medal at the 2001 World Youth Championships, finished fifth at the 2002 World Junior Championships, won a silver medal at the 2003 European Junior Championships, and a bronze medal at the 2003 Military World Games. He formerly held the world junior record with 5.66 metres.

He later finished ninth at the 2005 European U23 Championships, and seventh at the 2005 European Indoor Championships.

His personal best is 5.70 metres, achieved in June 2003 in Tula, Russia. He retired after the 2008 season.
