= Damiel Dossevi =

French pole vaulter (born 1983)

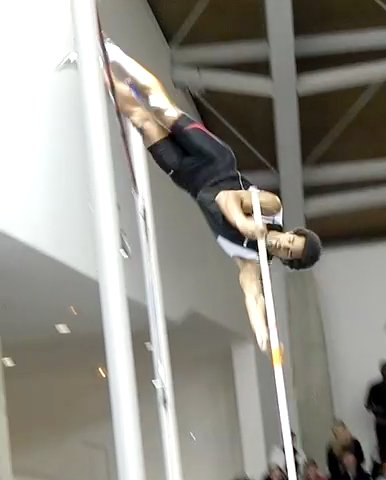
Dossevi competing in Paris in 2010

Damiel Dossevi (born 3 February 1983) is a French pole vaulter.

He finished fifteenth at the 2006 European Championships. He also competed at the 2005 European Indoor Championships, the 2005 World Championships and the 2007 World Championships without reaching the final.

His personal best jump is 5.75 metres, which he achieved in July 2005 in Erfurt.

== Personal life ==
Dossevi was born in Chambray-lès-Tours. His father Othniel is a former footballer. His sister Narayane is also an athlete. His uncle Pierre-Antoine and his cousins Thomas and Mathieu are all footballers.

== Competition record ==
Year	Competition	Venue	Position	Notes
Representing France
2001	European Junior Championships	Grosseto, Italy	14th (q)	4.90 m
2003	European U23 Championships	Bydgoszcz, Poland	13th (q)	5.20 m
2005	European Indoor Championships	Madrid, Spain	22nd (q)	5.40 m
2005	European U23 Championships	Erfurt, Germany	1st	5.75 m
2005	World Championships	Helsinki, Finland	13th (q)	5.45 m
2005	Jeux de la Francophonie	Niamey, Niger	1st	5.40 m
2006	European Championships	Gothenburg, Sweden	15th	5.40 m
2007	World Championships	Osaka, Japan	25th (q)	5.40 m
2009	World Championships	Berlin, Germany	6th	5.75 m
2010	World Indoor Championships	Doha, Qatar	18th (q)	5.30 m
2010	European Championships	Barcelona, Spain	5th	5.70 m
2011	European Indoor Championships	Paris, France	11th (q)	5.55 m
