= Revenko =

Revenko (Ukrainian: Ревенко), is a Ukrainian surname. Notable people with the surname include:

- Ivan Revenko (born 1986), Russian para-athlete
- Vladyslav Revenko (born 1984), Ukrainian pole vaulter
- Yevgeny Revenko (born 1972), Russian politician
