= 1992 World Junior Championships in Athletics – Men's pole vault =

The men's pole vault event at the 1992 World Junior Championships in Athletics was held in Seoul, South Korea, at Olympic Stadium on 16 and 18 September.

== Medalists ==
Gold	Laurens Looije; Netherlands
Silver	Daniel Martí; Spain
Bronze	Okkert Brits; South Africa

== Results ==
=== Final ===
18 September

Rank	Name	Nationality	Result	Notes
1st place, gold medalist(s)	Laurens Looije	Netherlands	5.45	
2nd place, silver medalist(s)	Daniel Martí	Spain	5.40	
3rd place, bronze medalist(s)	Okkert Brits	South Africa	5.40	
4	Neil Winter	United Kingdom	5.30	
5	Fabrice Le Monnier	France	5.20	
6	Michael Kühnke	Germany	5.20	
7	Yuriy Yeliseyev	Commonwealth of Independent States	5.10	
8	James Miller	Australia	5.00	
8	Manne Willman	Finland	5.00	
10	Christian Tamminga	Netherlands	5.00	
11	Asparukh Ivanov	Bulgaria	5.00	
12	Nick Buckfield	United Kingdom	4.90	
13	Alberto Giacchetto	Italy	4.80	
	José Arcos	Spain	NH	
	Sergey Voronin	Commonwealth of Independent States	NH	

=== Qualifications ===
16 Sep

==== Group A ====
Rank	Name	Nationality	Result	Notes
1	Sergey Voronin	Commonwealth of Independent States	5.10	q
2	Nick Buckfield	United Kingdom	5.10	q
3	Daniel Martí	Spain	5.00	q
3	Laurens Looije	Netherlands	5.00	q
5	Manne Willman	Finland	5.00	q
6	Fabrice Le Monnier	France	5.00	q
7	Tine Lorenci	Slovenia	4.80	
8	Domitien Mestre	Belgium	4.80	
9	Ákos Kovács	Hungary	4.70	
	Michael Stolle	Germany	NH	
	Maurilio Mariani	Italy	NH	
	Masaki Miyake	Japan	NH	

==== Group B ====
Rank	Name	Nationality	Result	Notes
1	James Miller	Australia	5.00	q
1	Okkert Brits	South Africa	5.00	q
3	José Arcos	Spain	5.00	q
4	Asparukh Ivanov	Bulgaria	5.00	q
5	Michael Kühnke	Germany	5.00	q
6	Christian Tamminga	Netherlands	4.90	q
7	Yuriy Yeliseyev	Commonwealth of Independent States	4.90	q
7	Neil Winter	United Kingdom	4.90	q
9	Alberto Giacchetto	Italy	4.90	q
10	Hrístos Sagris	Greece	4.80	
	Manabu Yokoyama	Japan	NH	
	Kim Se-In	South Korea	NH	

== Participation ==
According to an unofficial count, 24 athletes from 17 countries participated in the event.

- Australia (1)
- Belgium (1)
- Bulgaria (1)
- Commonwealth of Independent States (2)
- Finland (1)
- France (1)
- Germany (2)
- Greece (1)
- Hungary (1)
- Italy (2)
- Japan (2)
- Netherlands (2)
- Slovenia (1)
- South Africa (1)
- South Korea (1)
- Spain (2)
- United Kingdom (2)
