= Przemysław Czerwiński =

Polish pole vaulter (born 1983)

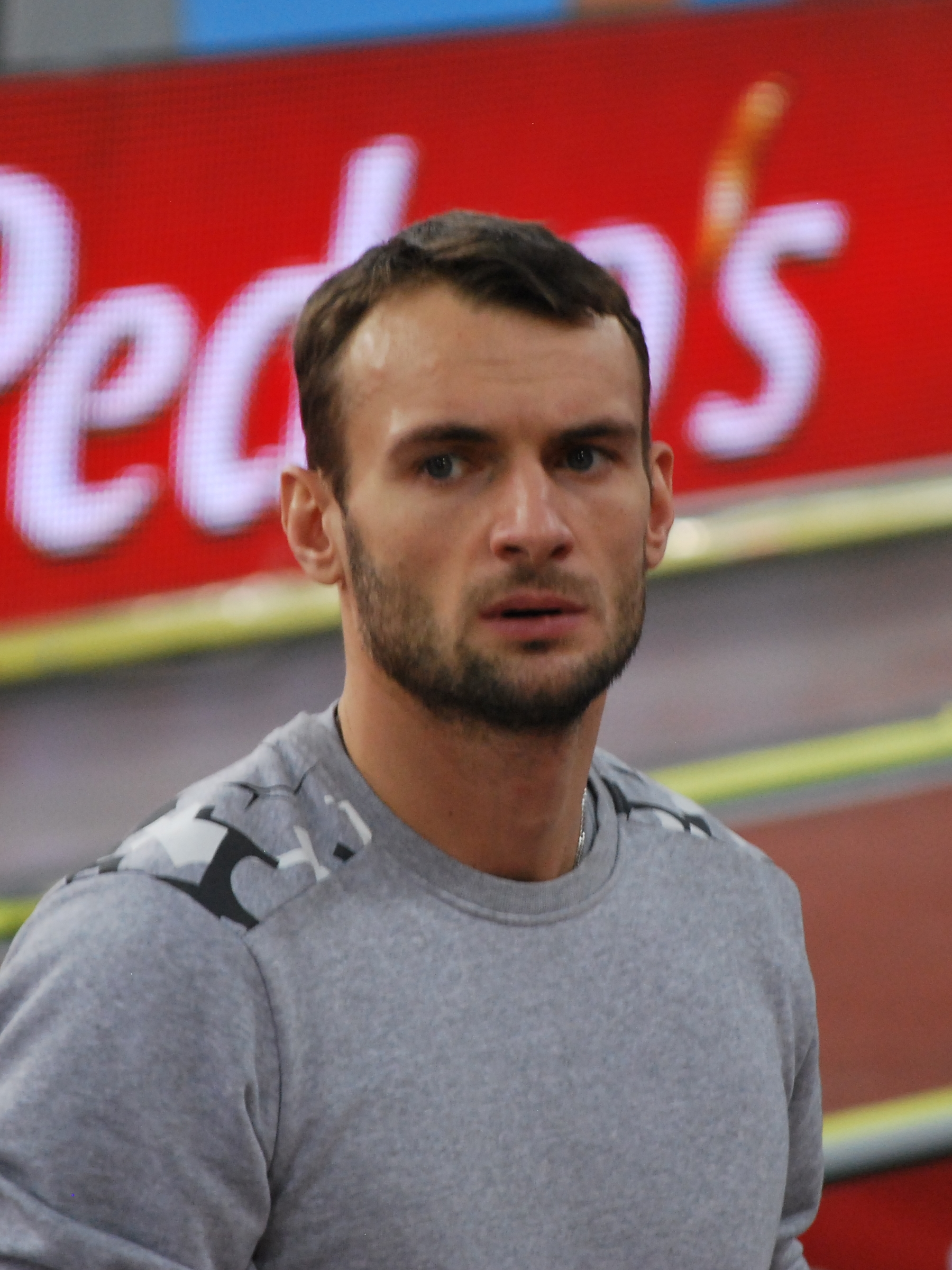
- Przemysław Czerwiński in 2015

Medal record

Men's athletics

Representing Poland

European Championships
Bronze medal – third place	2010 Barcelona	Pole vault

European Team Championships
Silver medal – second place	2010 Bergen	Pole vault

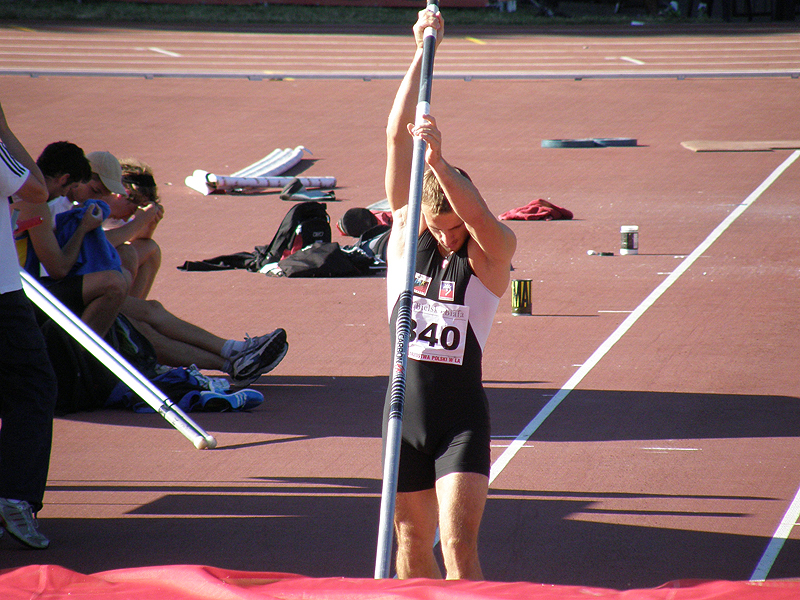
Przemysław Czerwiński, 2010 Polish Championships in Athletics (Bielsko-Biała)

Przemysław Czerwiński (born 28 July 1983) is a Polish pole vaulter.

Czerwiński was born in Piła. He finished 5th in the pole vault final at the 2006 European Athletics Championships in Gothenburg.

== Competition record ==
Year	Competition	Venue	Position	Notes
Representing Poland
1999	World Youth Championships	Bydgoszcz, Poland	13th (q)	4.60 m
2001	European Junior Championships	Grosseto, Italy	7th	5.15 m
2002	World Junior Championships	Kingston, Jamaica	8th	5.30 m
2003	European U23 Championships	Bydgoszcz, Poland	13th (q)	5.20 m
2005	European U23 Championships	Erfurt, Germany	7th	5.50 m
2005	Universiade	İzmir, Turkey	5th	5.50 m
2006	World Indoor Championships	Moscow, Russia	10th (q)	5.65 m
2006	European Championships	Gothenburg, Sweden	5th	5.65 m
2007	European Indoor Championships	Birmingham, United Kingdom	16th (q)	5.40 m
2008	Olympic Games	Beijing, China	11th	5.45 m
2010	European Championships	Barcelona, Spain	3rd	5.75 m
2012	European Championships	Helsinki, Finland	–	NM

== Personal bests ==
Outdoor

- Pole vault – 5.80 m (Zhukovskiy 2006)

Indoor

- Pole vault – 5.82 m (Donetsk 2010)
