= Michal Balner =

Czech pole vaulter

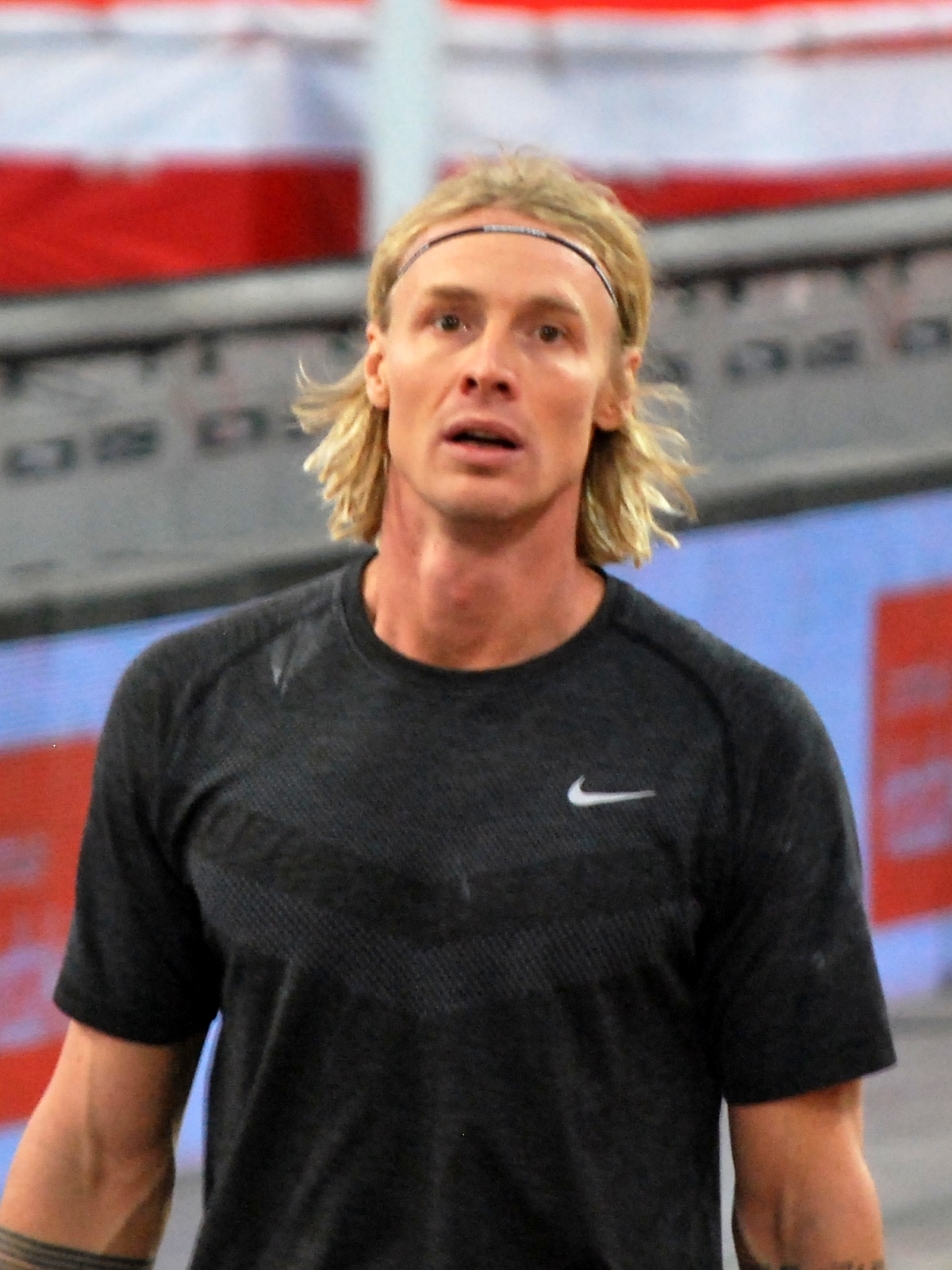

Personal information
- Born: September 12, 1982 (age 43) Opava, Czech Republic
- Height: 1.91 m (6 ft 3 in)
- Weight: 80 kg (180 lb)

Sport
- Country: Czech Republic
- Sport: Track and field
- Event: Pole vault

Michal Balner (born 12 September 1982 in Opava) is a Czech athlete who specialises in the pole vault. He represented his country at the 2007 and 2013 World Championships without qualifying for the final. His best outing was the sixth place at the 2010 World Indoor Championships.

His personal bests in the event are 5.82 metres outdoors (Baku 2015) and 5.76 metres indoors (Prague 2010).

In 2010 he received a one-month ban after testing positive for cannabis.

== Competition record ==
Year	Competition	Venue	Position	Notes
Representing the Czech Republic
2007	World Championships	Osaka, Japan	19th (q)	5.55 m
2009	European Indoor Championships	Turin, Italy	14th (q)	5.40 m
2010	World Indoor Championships	Doha, Qatar	6th	5.45 m
2010	European Championships	Barcelona, Spain	13th (q)	5.60 m
2013	World Championships	Moscow, Russia	–	NM
2014	European Championships	Zürich, Switzerland	20th (q)	5.30 m
2015	European Indoor Championships	Prague, Czech Republic	12th (q)	5.45 m
2015	World Championships	Beijing, China	7th	5.65 m
2016	World Indoor Championships	Portland, United States	9th	5.55 m
2016	European Championships	Amsterdam, Netherlands	19th (q)	5.35 m
2016	Olympic Games	Rio de Janeiro, Brazil	7th	5.50 m
2017	World Championships	London, United Kingdom	25th (q)	5.45 m
