= Dmitry Starodubtsev =

Russian pole vaulter

Personal information
- Born: January 3, 1986 (age 40)
- Height: 1.91 m (6 ft 3 in)
- Weight: 79 kg (174 lb)

Sport
- Country: Russia
- Sport: Athletics
- Event: Pole Vault
Medal record
Summer Universiade
Bronze medal – third place	2007 Bangkok	Pole vault
World Junior Championships
Gold medal – first place	2004 Grosseto	Pole vault
World Youth Championships
Gold medal – first place	2003 Sherbrooke	Pole vault
- Updated on 7 July 2016

Dmitry Andreevich Starodubtsev (Russian: Дмитрий Андреевич Стародубцев); born 3 January 1986 in Chelyabinsk) is a Russian pole vaulter. He has a personal best of 5.90 m and was a finalist at the 2008 Summer Olympics, the 2011 World Championships in Athletics and the 2012 Summer Olympics. He has won medals at world youth and junior levels and was third at the Summer Universiade in 2007.

Prior to his senior debut, Starodubtsev had much success at competitions in the younger age categories. At the 2003 World Youth Championships in Athletics he cleared a personal best of 5.10 m to take the silver medal behind Argentina's Germán Chiaraviglio. He then went on to claim consecutive gold medals at the 2004 World Junior Championships in Athletics and the 2005 European Athletics Junior Championships.

He won his first national title indoors with a personal best of 5.65 m at the beginning of 2006 and went on to make his senior debut for Russia at the 2006 IAAF World Indoor Championships in Moscow, where he was eliminated in the qualifying round. Later that year he competed outdoors, finishing tenth in the qualifiers at the 2006 European Athletics Championships then ninth at the 2006 IAAF World Cup. He equalled his personal best to make the final at the 2007 European Athletics Indoor Championships, but managed only 5.41 m in the last round to finish sixth overall. While studying at university, he won his first student-level medal at the 2007 Summer Universiade, taking the bronze at the event in Bangkok. In August that year he set a new best outdoors with a clearance of 5.70 m in Tula.

In 2008 he cleared 5.70 m indoors then improved to 5.75 m outdoors at a meeting in Kazan. This was enough to make the Russian Olympic team for the 2008 Beijing Olympics and he reached his first major senior final, finishing in fifth place with a vault of 5.70 m. He cleared 5.70 m both indoors and outdoors in 2009, but his sole international competition was the 2009 European Athletics Indoor Championships where he failed to reach the final. In 2010 he was sixth at the World Indoor Championships but did not record a valid mark in the final at the European Championships.

Starodubtsev won another Russian indoor title in 2011, but was knocked out in the preliminaries of the European Indoor Championships. He was the runner-up at the Russian outdoor championships with a vault of 5.72 m and gained selection for the 2011 World Championships in Athletics. In his second senior global final, he finished in twelfth place. At the end of 2011 he showed the results of his improved physical conditioning with two clearances of 5.90 m in Chelyabinsk – a mark which raised him into the top twenty pole vaulters of all time.

== Doping ==
Samples taken during the 2012 Olympics were retested in 2016. On October 27, 2016, it was announced that Starodubtsev tested positive for dehydrochlormethyltestosterone (turinabol) and his results from the 2012 Olympics were disqualified. He was given a two-year ban.

== Achievements ==
Year	Competition	Venue	Position	Notes
Representing Russia
2003	World Youth Championships	Sherbrooke, Canada	2nd	5.10 m
2004	World Junior Championships	Grosseto, Italy	1st	5.50 m
2005	European Junior Championships	Kaunas, Lithuania	1st	5.50 m
2005	Universiade	İzmir, Turkey	7th	5.50 m
2006	World Indoor Championships	Moscow, Russia	13th (q)	5.55 m
2006	European Championships	Gothenburg, Sweden	21st	5.45 m
2006	World Cup	Athens, Greece	9th	5.20 m
2007	European Indoor Championships	Birmingham, United Kingdom	6th	5.41 m
2007	European U23 Championships	Debrecen, Hungary	4th	5.60 m
2007	Universiade	Bangkok, Thailand	3rd	5.50 m
2008	Olympic Games	Beijing, China	5th	5.70 m
2009	European Indoor Championships	Turin, Italy	11th (q)	5.55 m
2010	World Indoor Championships	Doha, Qatar	6th	5.45 m
2010	European Championships	Barcelona, Spain	–	NM
2011	European Indoor Championships	Paris, France	11th (q)	5.55 m
2011	World Championships	Daegu, South Korea	12th	5.65 m
2012	World Indoor Championships	Istanbul, Turkey	9th	5.50 m
2012	Olympic Games	London, United Kingdom	DSQ (4th)	5.75 m

== See also ==
- List of doping cases in athletics
