= Konstantinos Filippidis =

Greek pole vaulter (born 1986)

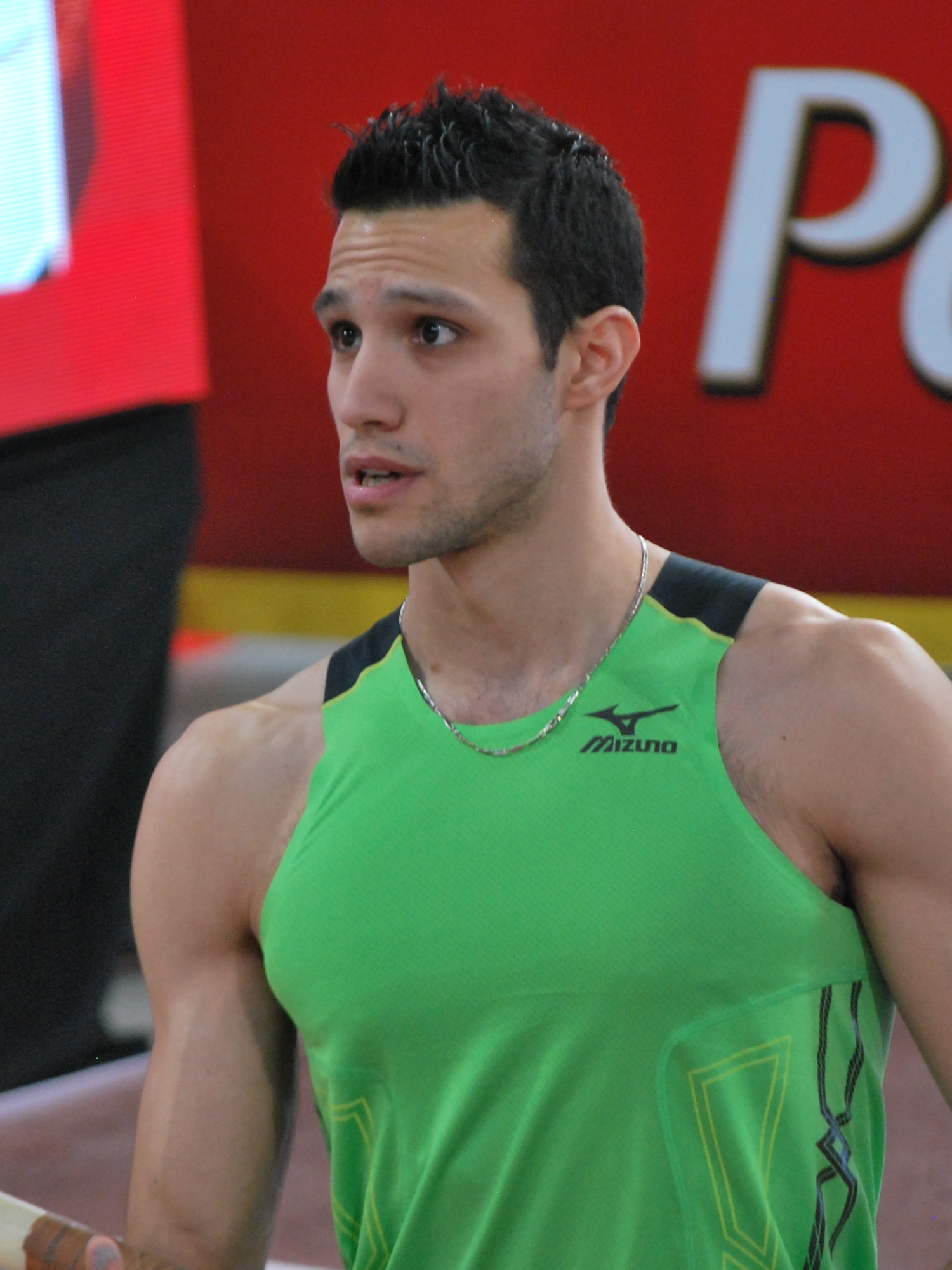
- Filippidis in 2015

Personal information
- Born: 26 November 1986 (age 39) Cholargos, Greece
- Height: 1.90 m (6 ft 3 in)
- Weight: 78 kg (172 lb)

Sport
- Country: Greece
- Sport: Track and field
- Event: Pole vault
- Club: Panellinios G.S.

Achievements and titles
- Personal best: 5.91m (outdoor) [ (2015) 5.85m (indoor) (2017,2018)
Medal record
World Indoor Championships
Gold medal – first place	2014 Sopot	Pole vault
European Indoor Championships
Silver medal – second place	2017 Belgrade	Pole vault
European Team Championships
Gold medal – first place	2015 Heraklion	Pole vault
Mediterranean Games
Gold medal – first place	2005 Almería	Pole vault
Universiade
Silver medal – second place	2005 İzmir	Pole vault
European Junior Championships
Silver medal – second place	2005 Kaunas	Pole Vault

Konstantinos Filippidis (Greek: Κωνσταντίνος Φιλιππίδης; born 26 November 1986) is a Greek former pole vaulter. He won the gold medal at the 2014 World Indoor Championships and the silver medal at the 2017 European Indoor Championships. He took the sixth place at the 2012 Olympic Games in London.

== Biography ==
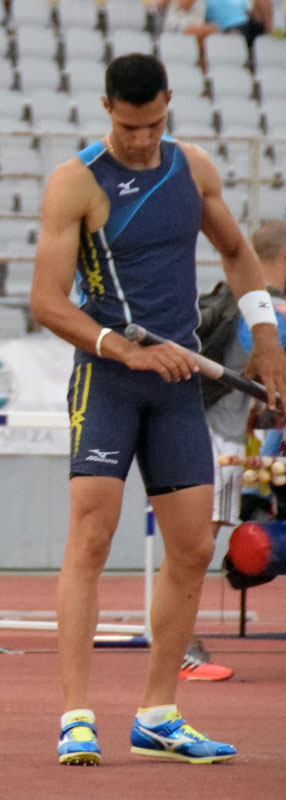

=== Junior level ===
He was successful at the junior level, finishing fourth at both the 2003 World Youth Championships and the 2004 World Junior Championships and winning a silver medal at the 2005 European Junior Championships. In the same year, he won the silver medal at the 2005 Summer Universiade with a personal best jump of 5.75 metres. He also competed at the 2005 World Championships and the 2006 European Athletics Championships without qualifying for the final.

=== Suspension: 2007–2009 ===
In 2007 Filippidis was found guilty of etilephrine doping. The sample was delivered on 16 June 2007 in an in-competition test at the national athletics championships. He received an IAAF suspension from July 2007 to July 2009. He then successfully applied for a reduction in his ineligibility period and subsequently he was eligible to resume competition from the 16th of February 2009.

=== Comeback: 2010–2012 ===
After his comeback in 2010, he improved his personal best and the national indoor record (5.70 m) and later took 4th place in the 2010 World Indoor Championships.

The following year he started the season with another national indoor record (5.72 m) and also reached the final of the 2011 European Indoor Championships, taking the 5th place. During the summer season, he took third place at the IAAF Diamond League in Paris with 5.68 m, second place with 5.72 m in the meeting at Jockgrim and won the Greek National Championship with a vault of 5.73 m. At the 2011 World Championships, he improved his season's best and took the 6th place with a vault of 5.75m, equaling his 2005 Greek record.

In the 2012 indoor season, Filippidis again broke the Greek national record with a vault of 5.75 m, while in the 2012 IAAF World Indoor Championships in Istanbul he once again reached the final, taking 7th place. Later on that summer, he was again 7th at the final of the 2012 Summer Olympics in London. After the Games, he twice improved the Greek record (first to 5.76 m and then finally to 5.80 m).

=== 2013-2014 World Indoor Champion ===
On 2013 Filippídis took the first place in the World Challenge in Berlin. He managed a vault 5.70 metres on his third attempt.

Konstantinos Filippídis took the first place in the 2014 World Indoor Championships in Sopot. The Greek champion progressed through the final with no failures until the winning height of 5.80m, winning the world indoor title with a season's best.

== Personal bests ==
Event	Mark	Date	Venue
Pole vault (outdoor)	5.91 m (NR)	4 July 2015	Meeting Areva, Paris, France
Pole vault (indoor)	5.85 m (NR)	3 March 2017	European Indoor Championships, Belgrade, Serbia

== Competition record ==
Year	Competition	Venue	Position	Notes
Representing Greece
2003	World Youth Championships	Sherbrooke, Canada	4th	4.95 m
2004	World Junior Championships	Grosseto, Italy	4th	5.35 m
2005	European Indoor Championships	Madrid, Spain	9th (q)	5.60 m
2005	Mediterranean Games	Almería, Spain	1st	5.60 m
2005	European Junior Championships	Kaunas, Lithuania	2nd	5.45 m
2005	World Championships	Helsinki, Finland	14th (q)	5.45 m
2005	Universiade	İzmir, Turkey	2nd	5.75 m (NR)
2006	European Championships	Gothenburg, Sweden	26th (q)	5.35 m
2009	Universiade	Belgrade, Serbia	9th	5.15 m
2009	World Championships	Berlin, Germany	15th (q)	5.55 m
2010	World Indoor Championships	Doha, Qatar	4th	5.65 m
2010	European Championships	Barcelona, Spain	21st (q)	5.40 m
2011	European Indoor Championships	Paris, France	5th	5.61 m
2011	World Championships	Daegu, South Korea	6th	5.75 m (=NR)
2012	World Indoor Championships	Istanbul, Turkey	7th	5.70 m
2012	European Championships	Helsinki, Finland	5th	5.72 m (SB)
2012	Olympic Games	London, United Kingdom	6th	5.65 m
2013	European Indoor Championships	Gothenburg, Sweden	4th	5.76 m
2013	World Championships	Moscow, Russia	10th	5.65 m
2014	World Indoor Championships	Sopot, Poland	1st	5.80 m
2014	European Championships	Zurich, Switzerland	7th	5.60 m
2015	European Indoor Championships	Prague, Czech Republic	5th	5.75 m
2015	World Championships	Beijing, China	25th (q)	5.55 m
2016	World Indoor Championships	Portland, United States	7th	5.65 m
2016	European Championships	Amsterdam, Netherlands	7th	5.30 m
2016	Olympic Games	Rio de Janeiro, Brazil	7th	5.50 m
2017	European Indoor Championships	Belgrade, Serbia	2nd	5.85 m (NR i)
2018	World Indoor Championships	Birmingham, United Kingdom	7th	5.70
2018	European Championships	Berlin, Germany	6th	5.75 m
2019	European Indoor Championships	Glasgow, United Kingdom	8th (q)	5.60 m^{1}
2019	World Championships	Doha, Qatar	13th (q)	5.70 m
2021	European Indoor Championships	Toruń, Poland	11th (q)	5.50 m
2021	Olympic Games	Tokyo, Japan	22nd (q)	5.50 m

^{1}No mark in the final

== See also ==
- List of doping cases in athletics
