= Maksym Mazuryk =

Ukrainian pole vaulter (born 1983)

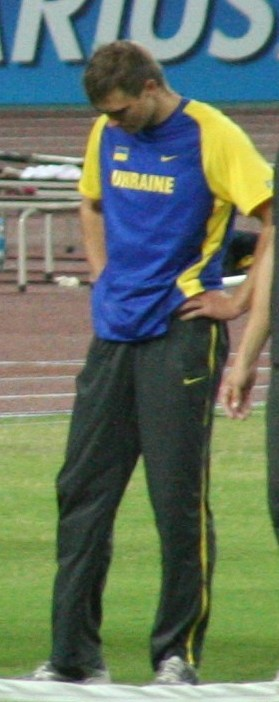
- Maksym Mazuryk in 2007

Personal information
- Born: April 2, 1983 (age 43)
- Height: 1.90 m (6 ft 3 in)
- Weight: 90 kg (198 lb)

Sport
- Country: Ukraine
- Sport: Athletics
- Event: Pole Vault
Medal record
Diamond League Final
Third place	2010	Pole vault
European Championships
Silver medal – second place	2010 Barcelona	Pole vault
European Team Championships
Gold medal – first place	2011 Stockholm	Pole vault
European U23 Championships
Bronze medal – third place	2003 Bydgoszcz	Pole Vault
World Junior Championships
Gold medal – first place	2002 Kingston	Pole Vault
- Updated on 11 August 2012

Maksym Mazuryk (Ukrainian: Максим Мазурик; born April 2, 1983) is a Ukrainian pole vaulter. He was born in Donetsk. He is sporter of Fenerbahçe S.K. from Turkey.

== Career ==
He was the 2002 World Junior champion, and finished 8th in the pole vault final at the 2006 European Athletics Championships in Gothenburg. He won a silver medal at the 2010 European Championships in Barcelona.

His personal best is 5.82 metres achieved in June 2008 in Yalta.

On 18 October 2016, he was sanctioned by IOC for testing positive to turinabol at the 2012 Olympic Games in London. However, the use of doping did not bring Mazuryk an athletic advantage, as he had failed to qualify for the final.

In May 2017, he was disqualified for two years for doping violations.

== Major competitions record ==
Year	Competition	Venue	Position	Notes
2002	World Junior Championships	Kingston, Jamaica	1st	5.55 m
2003	European U23 Championships	Bydgoszcz, Poland	3rd	5.45 m
2005	European U23 Championships	Erfurt, Germany	6th	5.60 m
2006	World Indoor Championships	Moscow, Russia	14th (q)	5.45 m
2006	European Championships	Gothenburg, Sweden	8th	5.50 m
2007	World Championships	Osaka, Japan	11th	5.76 m
2008	World Indoor Championships	Valencia, Spain	6th	5.70 m
2008	Olympic Games	Beijing, China	16th (q)	5.55 m
2009	World Championships	Berlin, Germany	4th	5.75 m
2010	World Indoor Championships	Doha, Qatar	14th (q)	5.45 m
2010	European Championships	Barcelona, Spain	2nd	5.80 m
2011	European Indoor Championships	Paris, France	9th (q)	5.55 m
2011	European Team Championships	Stockholm, Sweden	1st	5.72 m
2012	European Championships	Helsinki, Finland	8th	5.40 m
2012	Olympic Games	London, United Kingdom	DSQ (18th (q))	5.35 m
