= Spas Bukhalov =

Bulgarian pole vaulter

Spas Bukhalov (Cyrillic: Спас Бухалов; born 14 November 1980) is a Bulgarian pole vaulter.

He won the 2001 Balkan Games and finished sixth at the 2007 European Indoor Championships. He also competed at the Olympic Games in 2004 as well as the World Championships in 2003 and 2007 without reaching the final.

His personal best jump is 5.82 metres, achieved in June 2007 in Sofia. This is the Bulgarian, and Balkan, record.

He was born in Plovdiv.

== Competition record ==
Year	Competition	Venue	Position	Notes
Representing Bulgaria
2001	European U23 Championships	Amsterdam, Netherlands	1st (q)	5.30 m
2003	World Championships	Paris, France	15th (q)	5.60 m
2004	Olympic Games	Athens, Greece	27th (q)	5.50 m
2005	European Indoor Championships	Madrid, Spain	9th (q)	5.60 m
2006	World Indoor Championships	Moscow, Russia	14th (q)	5.45 m
2006	European Championships	Gothenburg, Sweden	18th	NM
2007	European Indoor Championships	Birmingham, United Kingdom	6th	5.41 m
2007	World Championships	Osaka, Japan	14th (q)	5.65 m
2008	World Indoor Championships	Valencia, Spain	–	NM
2008	Olympic Games	Beijing, China	25th (q)	5.45 m
2009	European Indoor Championships	Turin, Italy	8th	5.41 m
2009	World Championships	Berlin, Germany	22nd (q)	5.40 m
2010	World Indoor Championships	Doha, Qatar	18th (q)	5.30 m
