= Malte Mohr =

German pole vaulter (born 1986)

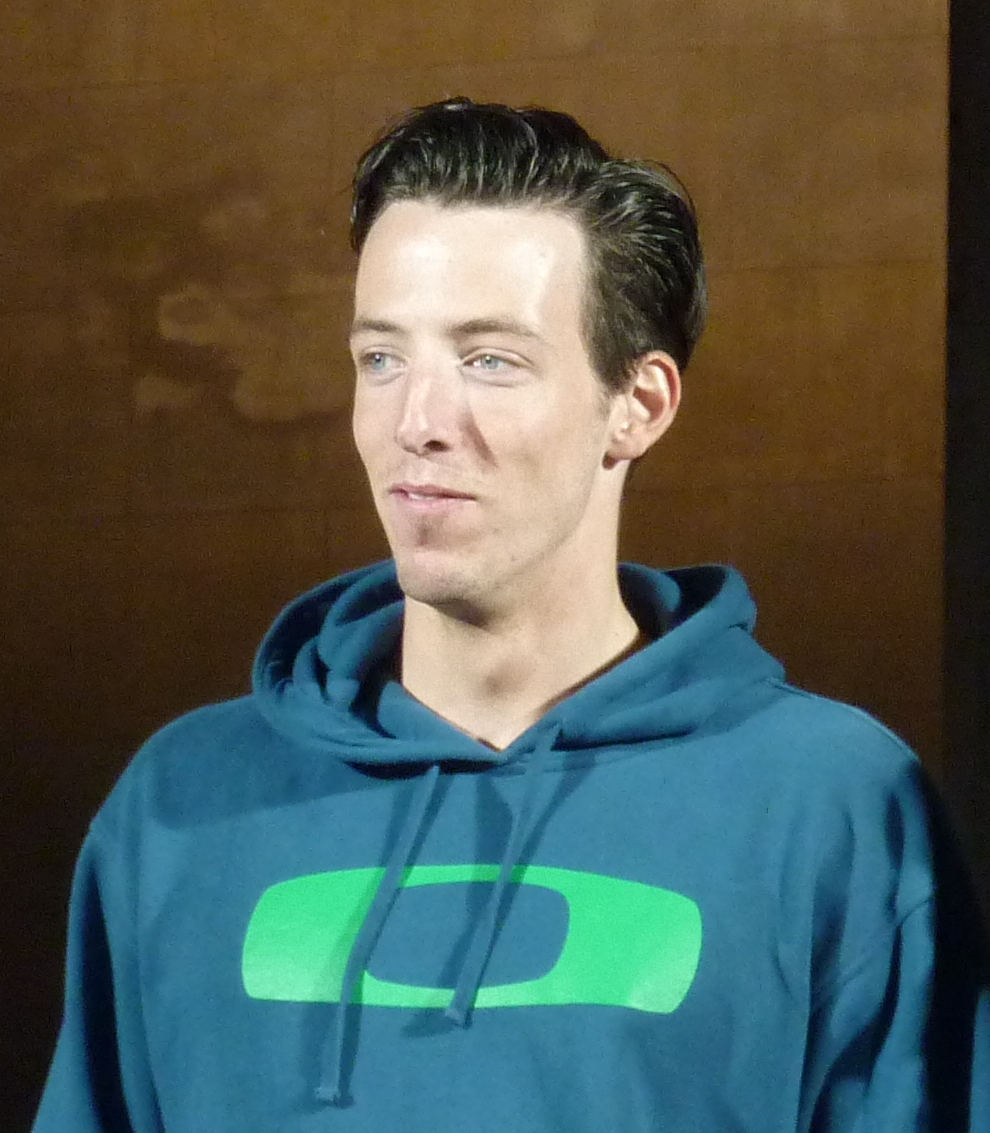
- Mohr in Munich in 2012

Personal information
- Nationality: German
- Born: 24 July 1986 (age 40) Bochum, West Germany
- Height: 1.92 m (6 ft 4 in)
- Weight: 83 kg (183 lb)

Sport
- Country: Germany
- Sport: Track and field
- Event: Pole vault
- Club: TV Wattenscheid
- Coached by: Chauncey Johnson

Achievements and titles
- Personal best: 5.91 m
Medal record
Men's athletics
Representing Germany
World Indoor Championships
Silver medal – second place	2010 Doha	Pole vault
Silver medal – second place	2014 Sopot	Pole vault
European Indoor Championships
Bronze medal – third place	2011 Paris	Pole vault
Bronze medal – third place	2013 Göteborg	Pole vault

Malte Mohr (born 24 July 1986) is a German pole vaulter. At the 2009 World Athletics Championships, Mohr finished in 14th place with a vault of 5.50 metres. At the 2010 IAAF World Indoor Championships, Mohr was runner-up behind Steve Hooker with a vault of 5.70 metres.

== Career ==
He was eliminated in the qualifying round of the 2009 European Athletics Indoor Championships, but two years later he reached the podium at the 2011 European Indoors with a clearance of 5.71 m for the bronze medal. He reached 5.85 m at the 2011 World Championships in Athletics, which brought him fifth place. He placed one position higher than that at the 2012 IAAF World Indoor Championships.

After winning at the 2012 German Athletics Championships, he improved his personal best to 5.91 m at a meeting in Ingolstadt in June 2012. Mohr was nominated to participate in the men's pole vault at the 2012 Summer Olympics in London, where he finished in 9th place with a vault of 5.50 m.

== Competition record ==
Year	Competition	Venue	Position	Notes
2009	European Indoor Championships	Turin, Italy	10th (q)	5.65 m
2009	World Championships	Berlin, Germany	14th	5.50 m
2010	World Indoor Championships	Doha, Qatar	2nd	5.70 m
2010	European Championships	Barcelona, Spain	17th (q)	5.50 m
2011	European Indoor Championships	Paris, France	3rd	5.71 m
2011	World Championships	Daegu, South Korea	5th	5.85 m
2012	World Indoor Championships	Istanbul, Turkey	4th	5.75 m
2012	European Championships	Helsinki, Finland	4th	5.77 m
2012	Olympic Games	London, United Kingdom	9th	5.50 m
2013	European Indoor Championships	Gothenburg, Sweden	3rd	5.76 m
2013	World Championships	Moscow, Russia	5th	5.82 m
2014	World Indoor Championships	Sopot, Poland	2nd	5.80 m

== Personal bests ==
As of 12 March 2016

Height	Date	Location	Notes
5.91	22 June 2012	Ingolstadt	Outdoor
5.90	1 March 2014	Berlin	Indoor

== See also ==
- Germany all-time top lists - Pole vault
