= Yavgeniy Olhovsky =

Israeli pole vaulter

Yavgeniy Olhovsky (Hebrew: יבגני אולחובסקי; born 22 December 1983) is an Israeli pole vaulter.

He finished eleventh at the 2002 World Junior Championships and competed at the 2009 World Championships without reaching the final.

His personal best jump is 5.48 metres, achieved in April 2009 in Coral Gables, Florida. He has 5.55 metres on the indoor track, achieved in February 2009 in Blacksburg, Virginia.

Olhovsky was a 7-time All-American for the Virginia Tech Hokies track and field team, finishing 2nd in the pole vault at the 2008 NCAA Division I Outdoor Track and Field Championships.
