= Giorgio Piantella =

Italian pole vaulter

Personal information
- Nationality: Italian
- Born: 6 July 1981 (age 44) Camposampiero, Italy
- Height: 1.82 m (5 ft 11 1/2 in)
- Weight: 83 kg (183 lb)

Sport
- Country: Italy
- Sport: Athletics
- Event: Pole vault
- Club: C.S. Carabinieri

Achievements and titles
- Personal best: Pole vault: 5.60 (2010)
Medal record
Summer Universiade
| Silver medal – second place | 2009 Belgrade | Pole vault |
Mediterranean Games
| Bronze medal – third place | 2013 Mersin | Pole vault |
World Military Championships
| Silver medal – second place | 2009 Sofia | Pole vault |

Giorgio Piantella (Camposampiero, 6 July 1981) is an Italian pole vaulter.

== Biography ==
He has 14 caps in national team from 2005 to 2012.

== Achievements ==
| Year | Competition | Venue | Position | Event | Notes |
|---|---|---|---|---|---|
| 2005 | Mediterranean Games | (Spain) Almeria | 4th | Pole vault | 5.45 m |
| 2003 | European U23 Championships | (Poland) Bydgoszcz | 4th | Pole vault | 5.30 m |
| 2009 | Summer Universiade | (Serbia) Belgrade | 2nd | Pole vault | 5.55 m |
| 2009 | World Military Championship | (Bulgaria) Sofia | 2nd | Pole vault | 5.55 m = |
| 2013 | Mediterranean Games | (Turkey) Mersin | 3rd | Pole vault | 5.50 m |

== National titles ==
Giorgio Piantella has won 15 times the individual national championship.

- 8 wins in the pole vault (2005, 2006, 2008, 2009, 2010, 2014, 2016, 2017)
- 7 wins in the pole vault indoor (2005, 2007, 2009, 2010, 2011, 2013, 2017)
