= Vladyslav Revenko =

Ukrainian pole vaulter

Vladyslav Revenko (born 15 November 1984 in Kiev Oblast, Soviet Union) is a Ukrainian pole vaulter.

He won the silver medal at the 2002 World Junior Championships. He also competed at the 2005 European Indoor Championships and the 2005 World Championships without reaching the final.

His personal best jump is 5.80 metres, achieved in June 2005 in Leiria.
