= Matti Mononen =

Finnish pole vaulter (born 1983)

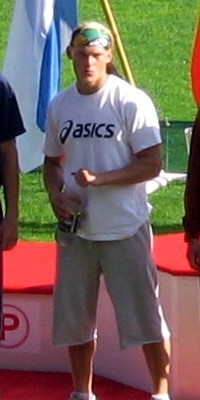
Matti Mononen in Kalevan kisat 2008

Matti Mononen (born November 25, 1983, in Rautjärvi) is a Finnish pole vaulter.

He finished fourth at the 2006 European Athletics Championships in Gothenburg. He also competed in the 2004 Olympics, but failed to qualify from his pool, despite equalling his personal best vault of 5.65 metres.

Currently his personal best is 5.70 metres, achieved in July 2005 in Lappeenranta. The Finnish record currently belongs to Jani Lehtonen with 5.82 metres.
