= Kevin Rans =

Belgian pole vaulter

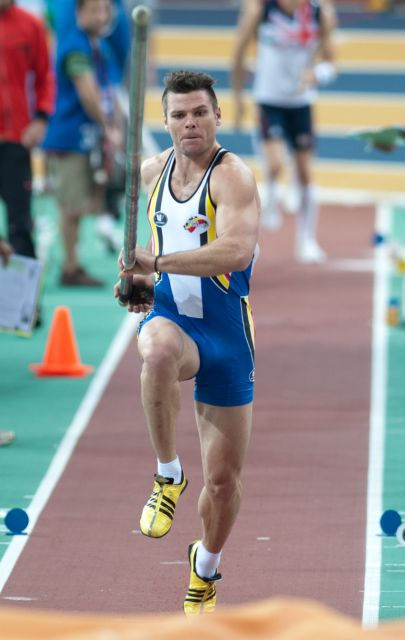
Kevin Rans at the 2010 World Indoor Championships in Doha

Kevin Rans (born 19 August 1982 in Ekeren) is a Belgian former pole vaulter.

He finished eighth at the 2000 World Junior Championships and tenth at the 2005 World Championships. He also competed at the 2006 World Indoor Championships and the 2006 European Championships without reaching the final round.

His personal best jump is 5.70 metres (18 ft 8 in), achieved in July 2007 in Heusden-Zolder. With this performance, he equaled the national record of Thibault Duval. Rans does hold the national junior record with 5.60 metres, and is also a former Belgian junior record holder in the 200 metres with 20.82 seconds.

In March 2009 he tested positive for Corticosteroids. He was first cleared by the Flemish Doping Tribunal, but it was overturned by IAAF and he was handed a 3-month ban.
