= 2016 China–Japan–Korea Friendship Athletic Meeting =

3rd China–Japan–Korea Friendship Athletic Meeting
- Dates: 3 July 2016
- Host city: Gimcheon, Korea
- Venue: Gimcheon Stadium
- Level: Senior
- Events: 16 (8 men, 8 women)
- Participation: 3 nations

The 3rd China–Japan–Korea Friendship Athletic Meeting were held at the Gimcheon Stadium in Gimcheon, Korea on July 3, 2016.

== Medal summary ==
=== Men ===
| Event | Gold | | Silver | | Bronze | |
|---|---|---|---|---|---|---|
| 100 metres | Kazuma Ōseto (JPN) | 10.37 | Kim Kuk-young (KOR) | 10.41 | Haiyang Xu (CHN) | 10.41 |
| 400 metres | Guo Zhongze (CHN) | 45.82 | Takeshi Fujiwara (JPN) | 46.60 | Kosuke Horii (JPN) | 47.02 |
| 110 metres hurdles | Xie Wenjun (CHN) | 13.54 | Hideki Omuro (JPN) | 13.62 | Kim Byoung-jun (KOR) | 13.63 |
| 4 × 100 metres relay | Japan; Tomoya Baba; Kotaro Taniguchi; Kazuma Ōseto; Shota Hara | 38.77 | China; Yang Yang; Jun Xu; Zhiqiang Wu; Xiandong Zhao | 32.97 | South Korea; Kyung-Soo Oh; Kim Min-Kyun; Kim Kuk-young; Jae-Ha Lee | 39.55 |
| 4 × 400 metres relay | Japan; Tomoya Tamura; Julian Walsh; Takamasa Kitagawa; Nobuya Kato | 3:04.62 | South Korea; Suhyun Eem; Seung-yoon Lee; Kwangyeol Kim; Dongbaek Choi | 3:10.42 | Not awarded | |
| Pole vault | Jin Min-sub (KOR) | 5.50 | Hiroki Sasase (JPN) | 5.40 | Koki Kuruma (JPN) | 5.40 |
| Long jump | Kim Deok-hyeon (KOR) | 7.89 | Gongchen Tang (CHN) | 7.67 | Yasuhiro Moro (JPN) | 7.59 |
| Javelin throw | Ma Qun (CHN) | 78.82 | Qizhen Liu (CHN) | 76.03 | Kohei Hasegawa (JPN) | 73.76 |

=== Women ===
| Event | Gold | | Silver | | Bronze | |
|---|---|---|---|---|---|---|
| 200 metres | Chisato Fukushima (JPN) | 23.27 | Fanghong Guo (CHN) | 24.09 | Min-ji Kim (KOR) | 24.23 |
| 800 metres | Wang Chunyu (CHN) | 2:03.45 | Zhao Jing (CHN) | 2:04.92 | Ran Urabe (JPN) | 2:07.15 |
| 400 metres hurdles | Wang Huan (CHN) | 57.51 | Yan Huang (CHN) | 57.94 | Miku Fujiwara (JPN) | 59.51 |
| 4 × 100 metres relay | Japan; Ami Saito; Chisato Fukushima; Nodoka Seko; Iyoba Edobor | 44.84 | South Korea; Jin You; Da-seul Kang; Hana Kim; Jung Hye-lim | 45.46 | Not awarded | |
| 4 × 400 metres relay | China; Gaoqin Pan; Wang Huan; Yan Huang; Chong Cheng | 3:33.93 | Japan; Seika Aoyama; Kana Ichikawa; Rin Aoki; Manami Kira | 3:34.71 | South Korea; Yu-Jin Woo; Ji-Eun Kim; Shin-Ae Kim; Yoobeen Lee | 3:48.95 |
| High jump | Yang Wang (CHN) | 1.81 | Jeong Soohye (KOR) | 1.81 | Darye Han (KOR) | 1.78 |
| High jump | Yang Wang (CHN) | 1.81 | Jeong Soohye (KOR) | 1.81 | Xingjuan Zheng (CHN) | 1.78 |
| Triple jump | Wang Wupin (CHN) | 13.62 | Kaede Miyasaka (JPN) | 13.16 | Mudan Chen (CHN) | 13.10 |
| Javelin throw | Lü Huihui (CHN) | 64.03 | Liu Shiying (CHN) | 63.03 | Risa Miyashita (JPN) | 57.77 |

== Score table ==
| Place | Gold | Silver | Bronze | 4th | 5th | 6th |
|---|---|---|---|---|---|---|
| Points | 10 | 8 | 7 | 6 | 5 | 4 |

| Event | | CHN | | JPN | | KOR | |
|---|---|---|---|---|---|---|---|
| 100 metres | M | 7 | 5 | 10 | 6 | 8 | 4 |
| 200 metres | W | 8 | 5 | 10 | 6 | 7 | 4 |
| 400 metres | M | 10 | – | 8 | 7 | 6 | 5 |
| 800 metres | W | 10 | 8 | 7 | 6 | 5 | – |
| 110 metre hurdles | M | 10 | 5 | 8 | 6 | 7 | 4 |
| 400 metre hurdles | W | 10 | 8 | 7 | – | 6 | 5 |
| 4 x 100 metres relay | M | 8 | | 10 | | 7 | |
| 4 x 100 metres relay | W | – | | – | | – | |
| 4 x 400 metres relay | M | – | | – | – | – | |
| 4 x 400 metres relay | W | 10 | | 8 | | 7 | |
| High jump | W | 10 | 7 | 5 | 4 | 8 | 7 |
| Pole vault | M | 5 | – | 8 | 7 | 10 | 6 |
| Long jump | M | 8 | – | 7 | 6 | 10 | 5 |
| Triple jump | W | 10 | 7 | 8 | 6 | 5 | – |
| Javelin throw | M | 10 | 8 | 7 | 5 | 6 | 4 |
| Javelin throw | W | 10 | 8 | 7 | 5 | 6 | 4 |

The host country is highlighted in lavender blue

=== Overall ===
| Rank | Nation | Gold | Silver | Bronze | 4th | 5th | 6th | Score |
|---|---|---|---|---|---|---|---|---|
| 1 | China | 9 | 7 | 3 | – | 4 | – | 187 |
| 2 | Japan | 3 | 5 | 7 | 6 | 3 | 1 | 174 |
| 3 | Korea | 2 | 2 | 5 | 5 | 4 | 5 | 146 |

=== Men ===
| Rank | Nation | Gold | Silver | Bronze | 4th | 5th | 6th | Score |
|---|---|---|---|---|---|---|---|---|
| 1 | Japan | 2 | 3 | 4 | 3 | 1 | – | 95 |
| 2 | Korea | 2 | 1 | 2 | 3 | 2 | 3 | 82 |
| 3 | China | 3 | 3 | 1 | – | 3 | – | 76 |

=== Women ===
| Rank | Nation | Gold | Silver | Bronze | 4th | 5th | 6th | Score |
|---|---|---|---|---|---|---|---|---|
| 1 | China | 6 | 4 | 2 | – | 1 | – | 111 |
| 2 | Japan | 1 | 2 | 3 | 3 | 2 | 1 | 79 |
| 3 | Korea | – | 1 | 3 | 2 | 3 | 2 | 64 |

== Results ==
=== Men ===
==== 100 meters ====
Prior to the competition, the records were as follows:

| World record | Usain Bolt (JAM) | 9.58 | Berlin, Germany | 16 August 2009 |
| Asian Record | Femi Ogunode (QAT) | 9.91 | Wuhan, China | 4 June 2015 |
| Asian Record | Femi Ogunode (QAT) | 9.91 | Gainesville, United States | 22 April 2016 |

Final – 15:06 –

Wind: +1.6 m/s

| Rank | Lane | Name | Nationality | Time | Notes |
|---|---|---|---|---|---|
| 1st place, gold medalist(s) | 3 | Kazuma Ōseto | Japan | 10.37 | |
| 2nd place, silver medalist(s) | 4 | Kim Kuk-young | South Korea | 10.41 | |
| 3rd place, bronze medalist(s) | 7 | Haiyang Xu | China | 10.41 | |
| 4 | 5 | Tomoya Baba | Japan | 10.42 | |
| 5 | 2 | Binglin Zhu | China | 10.52 | |
| 6 | 6 | Jae-Ha Lee | South Korea | 10.54 | |

==== 400 meters ====
Prior to the competition, the records were as follows:

| World record | Michael Johnson (USA) | 43.18 | Seville, Spain | 26 August 1999 |
| Asian Record | Yousef Masrahi (KSA) | 43.93 | Beijing, China | 23 August 2015 |

Final – 14:00 –

| Rank | Lane | Name | Nationality | Time | Notes |
|---|---|---|---|---|---|
| 1st place, gold medalist(s) | 5 | Guo Zhongze | China | 45.82 | |
| 2nd place, silver medalist(s) | 4 | Takeshi Fujiwara | Japan | 46.60 | |
| 3rd place, bronze medalist(s) | 6 | Kosuke Horii | Japan | 47.02 | |
| 4 | 3 | Seung-yoon Lee | South Korea | 48.13 | |
| 5 | 8 | Eum Su Hyun | South Korea | 48.15 | |
| | 7 | Chenbin Zhu | China | DNS | |

==== 110 meters hurdles ====
Prior to the competition, the records were as follows:

| World record | Aries Merritt (USA) | 12.80 | Brussels, Belgium | 7 September 2012 |
| Asian Record | Liu Xiang (CHN) | 12.88 | Lausanne, Switzerland | 11 July 2006 |

Final – 15:24 –

Wind: +1.7 m/s

| Rank | Lane | Name | Nationality | Time | Notes |
|---|---|---|---|---|---|
| 1st place, gold medalist(s) | 6 | Xie Wenjun | China | 13.54 | |
| 2nd place, silver medalist(s) | 3 | Hideki Omuro | Japan | 13.62 | |
| 3rd place, bronze medalist(s) | 5 | Kim Byoung-jun | South Korea | 13.63 | |
| 4 | 7 | Genta Masuno | Japan | 13.77 | |
| 5 | 4 | Zhang Honglin | China | 13.97 | |
| 6 | 8 | Gyeongtae Kim | South Korea | 14.63 | |

==== 4 x 100 meters relay ====
Prior to the competition, the records were as follows:

| World Record | Jamaica (Nesta Carter, Michael Frater, Yohan Blake, Usain Bolt) | 36.84 | London, Great Britain | 11 August 2012 |
| Asian Record | China (Mo Youxue, Xie Zhenye, Su Bingtian, Zhang Peimeng) | 37.92 | Beijing, China | 29 August 2015 |

Final – 16:28 –

| Rank | Lane | Nation | Competitors | Time | Notes |
|---|---|---|---|---|---|
| 1st place, gold medalist(s) | 6 | Japan | Tomoya Baba; Kotaro Taniguchi; Kazuma Ōseto; Shota Hara | 38.77 | |
| 2nd place, silver medalist(s) | 5 | China | Yang Yang; Jun Xu; Zhiqiang Wu; Xiandong Zhao | 39.27 | |
| 3rd place, bronze medalist(s) | 4 | South Korea | Kyung-Soo Oh; Kim Min-Kyun; Kim Kuk-young; Jae-Ha Lee | 39.55 | |

==== 4 x 400 meters relay ====
Prior to the competition, the records were as follows:

| World Record | United States (Andrew Valmon, Quincy Watts, Butch Reynolds, Michael Johnson) | 2:54.29 | Stuttgart, Germany | 22 August 1993 |
| Asian Record | Japan (Shunji Karube, Koji Ito, Jun Osakada, Shigekazu Omori) | 3:00.76 | Atlanta, GA, United States | 3 August 1996 |

Final – 16:43 –

| Rank | Lane | Nation | Competitors | Time | Notes |
|---|---|---|---|---|---|
| 1st place, gold medalist(s) | 4 | Japan | Tomoya Tamura; Julian Walsh; Takamasa Kitagawa; Nobuya Kato | 3:04.62 | |
| 2nd place, silver medalist(s) | 5 | South Korea | Suhyun Eem; Seung-yoon Lee; Kwangyeol Kim; Dongbaek Choi | 3:10.42 | |
| | 6 | Japan (B) | | DNS | |

==== Pole vault ====
Prior to the competition, the records were as follows:

| World record | Renaud Lavillenie (FRA) | 6.16 | Donetsk, Ukraine | 15 February 2014 |
| Asian Record | Igor Potapovich (KAZ) | 5.92 | Stockholm, Sweden | 19 February 1998 |

Final – 15:40 –

| Rank | Name | Nationality | 4.60 | 4.80 | 5.00 | 5.10 | 5.20 | 5.30 | 5.40 | 5.50 | 5.60 | 5.65 | 5.66 | Mark | Notes |
|---|---|---|---|---|---|---|---|---|---|---|---|---|---|---|---|
| 1st place, gold medalist(s) | Jin Min-sub | South Korea | – | – | – | o | – | xo | – | o | – | – | xxx | 5.50 | |
| 2nd place, silver medalist(s) | Hiroki Sasase | Japan | – | – | – | o | – | xo | xxo | – | xxx | | | 5.40 | |
| 3rd place, bronze medalist(s) | Koki Kuruma | Japan | – | – | o | – | xo | xxo | xxo | xxx | | | | 5.40 | |
| 4 | Duhyeon Han | South Korea | – | – | – | o | – | xxx | | | | | | 5.10 | |
| 5 | Wenfeng Zhong | China | – | – | xo | – | xxx | | | | | | | 5.00 | |
| | Xiang Xia | China | | | | | | | | | | | | DNS | |

==== Long jump ====
Prior to the competition, the records were as follows:

| World record | Mike Powell (USA) | 8.95 | Tokyo, Japan | 30 August 1991 |
| Asian Record | Mohamed Al-Khuwalidi (KSA) | 8.48 | Sotteville, France | 2 July 2006 |

Final – 14:50 –

| Rank | Name | Nationality | #1 | #2 | #3 | #4 | #5 | #6 | Mark | Notes |
|---|---|---|---|---|---|---|---|---|---|---|
| 1st place, gold medalist(s) | Kim Deok-hyeon | South Korea | 7.60 (-0.8 m/s) | 7.89 (-0.7 m/s) | x | 7.57 (-0.9 m/s) | – | – | 7.89 (-0.7 m/s) | |
| 2nd place, silver medalist(s) | Gongchen Tang | China | x | 7.35 (-0.1 m/s) | 7.45 (-1.1 m/s) | x | 7.54 (+0.5 m/s) | 7.67 (-0.9 m/s) | 7.67 (-0.9 m/s) | |
| 3rd place, bronze medalist(s) | Yasuhiro Moro | Japan | 7.45 (-0.3 m/s) | x | x | x | 7.45 (+0.2 m/s) | 7.59 (+0.0 m/s) | 7.59 (+0.0 m/s) | |
| 4 | Shinichiro Shimono | Japan | x | 7.33 (-0.5 m/s) | x | 7.51 (-0.7 m/s) | 7.54 (+0.2 m/s) | 7.36 (-0.6 m/s) | 7.54 (+0.2 m/s) | |
| 5 | Sang-Su Kim | South Korea | 7.38 (-0.0 m/s) | x | x | 6.75 (-0.8 m/s) | 7.36 (-0.1 m/s) | 7.43 (+0.6 m/s) | 7.43 (+0.6 m/s) | |
| | Yaoguang Zhang | China | | | | | | | DNS | |

==== Javelin throw ====
Prior to the competition, the records were as follows:

| World Record | Jan Železný (CZE) | 98.48 | Jena, Germany | 25 May 1996 |
| Asian Record | Zhao Qinggang (CHN) | 89.15 | Incheon, South Korea | 2 October 2014 |

Final – 15:42 –

| Rank | Athlete | Nationality | #1 | #2 | #3 | #4 | #5 | #6 | Mark | Notes |
|---|---|---|---|---|---|---|---|---|---|---|
| 1st place, gold medalist(s) | Ma Qun | China | 70.37 | 78.82 | 73.70 | x | 74.57 | 74.73 | 78.82 | |
| 2nd place, silver medalist(s) | Qizhen Liu | China | 74.82 | 72.15 | 71.00 | 71.98 | 71.71 | 76.03 | 76.03 | |
| 3rd place, bronze medalist(s) | Kohei Hasegawa | Japan | 73.05 | 73.76 | x | 70.00 | x | 72.34 | 73.76 | |
| 4 | Wongil Park | South Korea | 71.30 | x | 69.84 | 66.41 | 67.51 | x | 71.30 | |
| 5 | Takuto Kominami | Japan | 63.83 | 71.16 | 67.17 | x | 65.55 | 63.50 | 71.16 | |
| 6 | Jung Sang-jin | South Korea | 68.03 | 70.10 | x | x | 71.14 | x | 71.14 | |

=== Women ===
==== 200 meters ====
Prior to the competition, the records were as follows:

| World record | Florence Griffith Joyner (USA) | 21.34 | Seoul, South Korea | 29 September 1988 |
| Asian Record | Li Xuemei (CHN) | 22.01 | Shanghai, China | 22 October 1997 |

Final – 14:55 –

Wind: +0.7 m/s

| Rank | Lane | Name | Nationality | Time | Notes |
|---|---|---|---|---|---|
| 1st place, gold medalist(s) | 5 | Chisato Fukushima | Japan | 23.27 | |
| 2nd place, silver medalist(s) | 8 | Fanghong Guo | China | 24.09 | |
| 3rd place, bronze medalist(s) | 4 | Min-ji Kim | South Korea | 24.23 | |
| 4 | 3 | Naoka Miyake | Japan | 24.26 | |
| 5 | 6 | Guifen Huang | China | 24.30 | |
| 6 | 7 | Min-Jung Lee | South Korea | 24.36 | |

==== 800 meters ====
Prior to the competition, the records were as follows:

| World record | Jarmila Kratochvílová (TCH) | 1:53.28 | Munich, West Germany | 26 July 1983 |
| Asian Record | Liu Dong (CHN) | 1:55.54 | Beijing, China | 9 September 1993 |

Final – 14:44 –

| Rank | Lane | Name | Nationality | Time | Notes |
|---|---|---|---|---|---|
| 1st place, gold medalist(s) | 6 | Wang Chunyu | China | 2:03.45 | |
| 2nd place, silver medalist(s) | 4 | Zhao Jing | China | 2:04.92 | |
| 3rd place, bronze medalist(s) | 7 | Ran Urabe | Japan | 2:07.15 | |
| 4 | 5 | Hana Yamada | Japan | 2:07.23 | |
| 5 | 3 | Somang Shin | South Korea | 2:08.99 | |
| | 8 | Yoobeen Lee | South Korea | DNF | |

==== 400 meters hurdles ====
Prior to the competition, the records were as follows:

| World record | Yuliya Pechonkina (RUS) | 52.34 | Tula, Russia | 8 August 2003 |
| Asian Record | Han Qing (CHN) | 53.96 | Beijing, China | 9 September 1993 |
| Asian Record | Song Yinglan (CHN) | 53.96 | Guangzhou, China | 22 November 2001 |

Final – 14:30 –

| Rank | Lane | Name | Nationality | Time | Notes |
|---|---|---|---|---|---|
| 1st place, gold medalist(s) | 5 | Wang Huan | China | 57.51 | |
| 2nd place, silver medalist(s) | 3 | Yan Huang | China | 57.94 | |
| 3rd place, bronze medalist(s) | 7 | Miku Fujiwara | Japan | 59.51 | |
| 4 | 6 | Jung-Young Hee | South Korea | 1:00.23 | |
| 5 | 8 | Youngseo Jeon | South Korea | 1:06.20 | |
| | 4 | Miyabi Tago | Japan | DNF | |

==== 4 x 100 meters relay ====
Prior to the competition, the records were as follows:

| World Record | United States (Tianna Madison, Allyson Felix, Bianca Knight, Carmelita Jeter) | 40.82 | London, Great Britain | 10 August 2012 |
| Asian Record | China (Xiao Lin, Li Yali, Liu Xiaomei, Li Xuemei) | 42.23 | Shanghai, China | 23 October 1997 |

Final – 16:23 –

| Rank | Lane | Nation | Competitors | Time | Notes |
|---|---|---|---|---|---|
| 1st place, gold medalist(s) | 5 | Japan | Ami Saito; Chisato Fukushima; Nodoka Seko; Iyoba Edobor | 44.84 | |
| 2nd place, silver medalist(s) | 4 | South Korea | Jin You; Da-seul Kang; Hana Kim; Jung Hye-lim | 45.46 | |

==== 4 x 400 meters relay ====
Prior to the competition, the records were as follows:

| World Record | Soviet Union (Tatyana Ledovskaya, Olga Nazarova, Mariya Pinigina, Olga Bryzgina) | 3:15.17 | Seoul, South Korea | 1 October 1988 |
| Asian Record | China (An Xiaohong, Bai Xiaoyun, Cao Chunying, Ma Yuqin) | 3:24.28 | Beijing, China | 13 September 1993 |

Final – 16:36 –

| Rank | Lane | Nation | Competitors | Time | Notes |
|---|---|---|---|---|---|
| 1st place, gold medalist(s) | 5 | China | Gaoqin Pan; Wang Huan; Yan Huang; Chong Cheng | 3:33.93 | |
| 2nd place, silver medalist(s) | 4 | Japan | Seika Aoyama; Kana Ichikawa; Rin Aoki; Manami Kira | 3:34.71 | |
| 3rd place, bronze medalist(s) | 6 | South Korea | Yu-Jin Woo; Ji-Eun Kim; Shin-Ae Kim; Yoobeen Lee | 3:48.95 | |

==== High jump ====
Prior to the competition, the records were as follows:

| World record | Stefka Kostadinova (BUL) | 2.09 | Rome, Italy | 30 August 1987 |
| Asian Record | Marina Aitova (KAZ) | 1.99 | Athens, Greece | 13 July 2009 |

Final – 15:00 –

| Rank | Name | Nationality | 1.65 | 1.70 | 1.75 | 1.78 | 1.81 | 1.84 | Mark | Notes |
|---|---|---|---|---|---|---|---|---|---|---|
| 1st place, gold medalist(s) | Yang Wang | China | – | o | o | xo | o | xxx | 1.81 | |
| 2nd place, silver medalist(s) | Jeong Soohye | South Korea | o | o | o | xxo | o | xxx | 1.81 | |
| 3rd place, bronze medalist(s) | Darye Han | South Korea | o | o | o | o | xxx | | 1.78 | |
| 3rd place, bronze medalist(s) | Xingjuan Zheng | China | – | – | o | o | xxx | | 1.78 | |
| 5 | Haruka Nakano | Japan | o | xxo | xxo | xo | xxx | | 1.78 | |
| 6 | Yuzuki Ishioka | Japan | o | xo | xxx | | | | 1.70 | |

==== Triple jump ====
Prior to the competition, the records were as follows:

| World record | Inessa Kravets (UKR) | 15.50 | Gothenburg, Sweden | 10 August 1995 |
| Asian Record | Olga Rypakova (KAZ) | 15.25 | Croatia, Croatia | 4 September 2010 |

Final – 16:10 –

| Rank | Name | Nationality | #1 | #2 | #3 | #4 | #5 | #6 | Mark | Notes |
|---|---|---|---|---|---|---|---|---|---|---|
| 1st place, gold medalist(s) | Wang Wupin | China | 12.81 (+0.3 m/s) | 13.13 (-0.3 m/s) | 13.43 (-0.0 m/s) | 13.62 (+0.6 m/s) | 13.57 (+0.8 m/s) | 13.39 (+0.1 m/s) | 13.62 (+0.6 m/s) | |
| 2nd place, silver medalist(s) | Kaede Miyasaka | Japan | 13.16 (-0.1 m/s) | 13.13 (-0.3 m/s) | 13.06 (+0.6 m/s) | 13.00 (+0.6 m/s) | 13.01 (+0.6 m/s) | 12.98 (-0.2 m/s) | 13.16 (-0.1 m/s) | |
| 3rd place, bronze medalist(s) | Mudan Chen | China | 12.52 (+0.1 m/s) | 12.92 (-0.1 m/s) | 12.87 (-0.5 m/s) | 12.67 (-0.1 m/s) | 12.65 (+1.0 m/s) | 13.10 (+0.3 m/s) | 13.10 (+0.3 m/s) | |
| 4 | Eri Sakamoto | Japan | 12.69 (+0.1 m/s) | 12.59 (+0.1 m/s) | 12.54 (-0.6 m/s) | x | 12.85 (+0.7 m/s) | 12.73 (+0.6 m/s) | 12.85 (+0.7 m/s) | |
| 5 | Min-Hee Park | South Korea | 12.37 (+0.2 m/s) | 12.51 (-0.2 m/s) | 12.76 (+0.7 m/s) | 12.48 (+0.1 m/s) | 12.76 (+1.2 m/s) | 12.51 (+0.6 m/s) | 12.76 (+0.7 m/s) | |
| | Chanmi Bae | South Korea | x | – | – | x | – | – | NM | |

==== Javelin throw ====
Prior to the competition, the records were as follows:

| World Record | Barbora Špotáková (CZE) | 72.28 | Stuttgart, Germany | 13 September 2008 |
| Asian Record | Lü Huihui (CHN) | 66.13 | Beijing, China | 30 August 2015 |

Final – 14:45 –

| Rank | Athlete | Nationality | #1 | #2 | #3 | #4 | #5 | #6 | Mark | Notes |
|---|---|---|---|---|---|---|---|---|---|---|
| 1st place, gold medalist(s) | Lü Huihui | China | 59.55 | 62.45 | 64.03 | x | 58.26 | 59.68 | 64.03 | |
| 2nd place, silver medalist(s) | Liu Shiying | China | 61.64 | 60.45 | 63.03 | 58.50 | 55.46 | x | 63.03 | |
| 3rd place, bronze medalist(s) | Risa Miyashita | Japan | 54.29 | 53.66 | 50.98 | 57.77 | 57.03 | 55.56 | 57.77 | |
| 4 | Haean Seo | South Korea | 52.24 | 52.90 | 54.39 | 51.36 | 55.81 | 53.19 | 55.81 | |
| 5 | Kiho Kuze | Japan | 50.23 | 45.83 | 46.37 | 52.60 | 50.56 | 52.40 | 52.60 | |
| 6 | Hyohee Han | South Korea | 44.27 | 48.10 | 46.82 | 45.58 | 46.67 | 46.96 | 48.10 | |
