= 2015 China–Japan–Korea Friendship Athletic Meeting =

2nd China–Japan–Korea Friendship Athletic Meeting
- Dates: 12 July 2015
- Host city: Sapporo, Japan
- Venue: Sapporo Atsubetsu Park Stadium
- Level: Senior
- Events: 14 (7 men, 7 women)
- Participation: 3 nations
- Records set: 1 national records

The 2nd China–Japan–Korea Friendship Athletic Meeting were held at the Sapporo Atsubetsu Park Stadium in Sapporo, Japan on July 12, 2015.

== Medal summary ==
=== Men ===
Event	Gold		Silver		Bronze	
200 metres	Shota Hara (JPN)	20.50	Mo Youxue (CHN)	20.76	Shinji Takahira (JPN)	20.82
800 metres	Shoei Tanaka (JPN)	1:54.75	Moo-Young Lee (KOR)	1:55.08	Dongxu Gao (CHN)	1:55.24
400 metres hurdles	Takayuki Kishimoto (JPN)	50.06	Yuki Matsushita (JPN)	50.11	Wen Sheng (CHN)	50.43
4 × 400 metres relay	Japan; Tomoya Tamura; Yuzo Kanemaru; Naoki Kobayashi; Kosuke Horii	3:04.85	China; Wen Cheng; Chenbin Zhu; Dongxu Gao; Zhongze Guo	3:13.74	South Korea; Hyunho Kim; Moo Yong Lee; Sang Min Ju; Sangmin Lee	3:15.54
High jump	Shuo Yu (CHN)	2.24	Jinqi Guo (CHN)	2.18	Kazuhiro Ota (JPN)	2.18
Triple jump	Bin Dong (CHN)	17.21	Deok Hyeon Kim (KOR)	17.07	Shuo Cao (CHN)	16.98
Shot put	Tian Zizhong (CHN)	19.61	IL Woo Jung (KOR)	19.49 NR	Yang Lu (CHN)	19.00

=== Women ===
Event	Gold		Silver		Bronze	
100 metres	Wei Yongli (CHN)	11.32	Yuan Qiqi (CHN)	11.52	Yuki Miyazawa (JPN)	11.56
400 metres	Jingwen Chen (CHN)	55.41	Eun-Ju Jo (KOR)	56.01	Sayaka Aoki (JPN)	56.25
100 metres hurdles	Ya Kang (CHN)	13.10	Hitomi Shimura (JPN)	13.13	Anri Tanaka (JPN)	13.23
4 × 100 metres relay	China; Tao Yujia; Lingwei Kong; Yuan Qiqi; Wei Yongli	43.09	Japan; Yuki Miyazawa; Mizuki Nakamura; Nodoka Seko; Saori Kitakaze	45.08	South Korea; Sunae Lee; Minji Kim; Sockyung Oh; Ye-Jin Lee	46.23
Pole vault	Ren Mengqian (CHN)	4.25	Lim Eun-ji (KOR)	4.20	Megumi Nakada (JPN)	4.10
Long jump	Minjia Lu (CHN)	6.54	Xiaoxue Zhou (CHN)	6.46	Saeko Okayama (JPN)	6.27
Shot put	Ka Bian (CHN)	17.77	Liu Xiangrong (CHN)	15.92	Aya Ota (JPN)	15.53

== Score table ==
Place	Gold	Silver	Bronze	4th	5th	6th
Points	10	8	7	6	5	4

Event		CHN		JPN		KOR	
100 metres	W	10	8	7	6	5	4
200 metres	M	8	6	10	7	5	4
400 metres	W	10	–	7	–	8	6
800 metres	M	7	–	10	6	8	5
100 metre hurdles	W	10	–	8	7	6	5
400 metre hurdles	M	7	5	10	8	6	4
4 x 100 metres relay	W	10		8		7	
4 x 400 metres relay	M	8		10		7	
High jump	M	10	8	7	4	6	5
Pole vault	W	10	6	7	–	8	5
Long jump	W	10	8	7	6	5	4
Triple jump	M	10	7	6	5	8	4
Shot put	M	10	7	6	4	8	5
Shot put	W	10	8	7	5	6	4

The host country is highlighted in lavender blue

=== Overall ===
Rank	Nation	Gold	Silver	Bronze	4th	5th	6th	Score
1	China	10	6	4	2	1	–	193
2	Japan	4	3	8	5	2	2	168
3	Korea	–	5	2	5	8	6	148

=== Men ===
Rank	Nation	Gold	Silver	Bronze	4th	5th	6th	Score
1	Japan	4	1	2	3	1	2	93
2	China	3	3	4	1	1	–	93
3	Korea	–	3	1	2	4	3	75

=== Women ===
Rank	Nation	Gold	Silver	Bronze	4th	5th	6th	Score
1	China	7	3	–	1	–	–	100
2	Japan	–	2	6	2	1	–	75
3	Korea	–	2	1	3	4	3	73

== Results ==
=== Men ===
==== 200 meters ====
Prior to the competition, the records were as follows:

World record	Usain Bolt (JAM)	19.19	Berlin, Germany	20 August 2009
Asian Record	Shingo Suetsugu (JPN)	20.03	Yokohama, Japan	7 June 2003

Final – 15:40 –

Wind: +2.1 m/s

Rank	Lane	Name	Nationality	Time	Notes
1st place, gold medalist(s)	4	Shota Hara	Japan	20.50	
2nd place, silver medalist(s)	2	Mo Youxue	China	20.76	
3rd place, bronze medalist(s)	7	Shinji Takahira	Japan	20.82	
4	5	Xinyue Pan	China	21.08	
5	6	Doo-Hoh Lee	South Korea	21.26	
6	3	Min-Woo Yoo	South Korea	21.37	

==== 800 meters ====
Prior to the competition, the records were as follows:

World record	David Rudisha (KEN)	1:40.91	London, Great Britain	9 August 2012
Asian Record	Yusuf Saad Kamel (BHR)	1:42.79	Fontvieille, Monaco	29 July 2008

Final – 14:40 –

Rank	Lane	Name	Nationality	Time	Notes
1st place, gold medalist(s)	2	Shoei Tanaka	Japan	1:54.75	
2nd place, silver medalist(s)	6	Moo-Young Lee	South Korea	1:55.08	
3rd place, bronze medalist(s)	3	Dongxu Gao	China	1:55.24	
4	5	Gen Tanaka	Japan	1:55.70	
5	4	Sang-Min Lee	South Korea	1:59.07	

==== 400 meters hurdles ====
Prior to the competition, the records were as follows:

World record	Kevin Young (USA)	46.78	Barcelona, Spain	6 August 1992
Asian Record	Hadi Soua'an Al-Somaily (KSA)	47.53	Sydney, Australia	27 September 2000

Final – 14:10 –

Rank	Lane	Name	Nationality	Time	Notes
1st place, gold medalist(s)	4	Takayuki Kishimoto	Japan	50.06	
2nd place, silver medalist(s)	7	Yuki Matsushita	Japan	50.11	
3rd place, bronze medalist(s)	5	Wen Sheng	China	50.43	
4	3	Dae-Hong Kim	South Korea	51.57	
5	2	Ke Chen	China	53.60	
6	6	Sangmin Ju	South Korea	54.23	

==== 4 x 400 meters relay ====
Prior to the competition, the records were as follows:

World Record	United States (Andrew Valmon, Quincy Watts, Butch Reynolds, Michael Johnson)	2:54.29	Stuttgart, Germany	22 August 1993
Asian Record	Japan (Shunji Karube, Koji Ito, Jun Osakada, Shigekazu Omori)	3:00.76	Atlanta, GA, United States	3 August 1996

Final – 13:00 –

Rank	Lane	Nation	Competitors	Time	Notes
1st place, gold medalist(s)	5	Japan	Tomoya Tamura; Yuzo Kanemaru; Naoki Kobayashi; Kosuke Horii	3:04.85	
2nd place, silver medalist(s)	4	China	Wen Cheng; Chenbin Zhu; Dongxu Gao; Zhongze Guo	3:13.74	
3rd place, bronze medalist(s)	6	South Korea	Hyunho Kim; Moo Yong Lee; Sang Min Ju; Sangmin Lee	3:15.54	

==== High jump ====
Prior to the competition, the records were as follows:

World record	Javier Sotomayor (CUB)	2.45	Salamanca, Spain	27 July 1993
Asian Record	Mutaz Essa Barshim (QAT)	2.43	Brussels, Belgium	5 September 2014

Final – 14:00 –

Rank	Name	Nationality	2.05	2.10	2.15	2.18	2.21	2.24	2.27	Mark	Notes
1st place, gold medalist(s)	Shuo Yu	China	o	o	o	o	o	xo	xxx	2.24	
2nd place, silver medalist(s)	Jinqi Guo	China	o	o	o	o	xxx			2.18	
3rd place, bronze medalist(s)	Kazuhiro Ota	Japan	o	o	o	xxo	xxx			2.18	
4	Sang-Won Park	South Korea	o	o	o	xxx				2.15	
5	Sung-Dae Kim	South Korea	xo	o	o	xxx				2.15	
6	Yosihiro Yamashita	Japan	xo	xxo	xxx					2.10	

==== Triple jump ====
Prior to the competition, the records were as follows:

World record	Jonathan Edwards (GBR)	18.29	Gothenburg, Sweden	7 August 1995
Asian Record	Li Yanxi (CHN)	17.59	Jinan, China	26 October 2009

Final – 15:00 –

Rank	Name	Nationality	#1	#2	#3	#4	#5	#6	Mark	Notes
1st place, gold medalist(s)	Bin Dong	China	16.58 (+0.7 m/s)	17.12 (+1.5 m/s)	17.21 (+2.8 m/s)	17.05 (+1.7 m/s)	x	–	17.21 (+2.8 m/s)	
2nd place, silver medalist(s)	Deok Hyeon Kim	South Korea	16.68 (+3.6 m/s)	17.07 (+2.5 m/s)	16.86 (+2.4 m/s)	17.00 (+1.8 m/s)	–	–	17.07 (+2.5 m/s)	
3rd place, bronze medalist(s)	Shuo Cao	China	16.75 (+2.9 m/s)	16.84 (+2.3 m/s)	16.98 (+3.0 m/s)	x	x	16.07 (+2.4 m/s)	16.98 (+3.0 m/s)	
4	Kazuyoshi Ishikawa	Japan	15.89 (+1.2 m/s)	x	x	15.83 (+2.8 m/s)	16.22 (+1.6 m/s)	16.14 (+1.5 m/s)	16.22 (+1.6 m/s)	
5	Ryoma Yamamoto	Japan	15.02 (+3.1 m/s)	16.03 (+2.0 m/s)	16.02 (+3.0 m/s)	x	15.86 (+1.4 m/s)	15.24 (+2.5 m/s)	16.03 (+2.0 m/s)	
6	Jin-Suck Sung	South Korea	x	15.51 (+2.4 m/s)	15.68 (+3.3 m/s)	x	15.81 (+0.9 m/s)	15.19 (+3.2 m/s)	15.81 (+0.9 m/s)	

==== Shot put ====
Prior to the competition, the records were as follows:

World Record	Randy Barnes (USA)	23.12	Westwood, United States	20 May 1990
Asian Record	Sultan Abdulmajeed Al-Hebshi (KSA)	21.13	Doha, Qatar	8 May 2009

Final – 13:00 –

Rank	Athlete	Nationality	#1	#2	#3	#4	#5	#6	Mark	Notes
1st place, gold medalist(s)	Tian Zizhong	China	18.80	19.61	19.22	19.48	19.45	19.17	19.61	
2nd place, silver medalist(s)	IL Woo Jung	South Korea	19.18	19.49	19.13	x	19.16	x	19.49	NR
3rd place, bronze medalist(s)	Yang Lu	China	18.63	19.00	18.55	18.55	18.75	18.70	19.00	
4	Satoru Hatase	Japan	17.07	17.60	17.81	x	x	17.56	17.81	
5	Hyun-Bae Kim	South Korea	16.97	16.89	17.25	17.06	x	x	17.25	
6	Daichi Nakamura	Japan	15.89	16.18	16.88	16.60	16.81	16.72	16.88	

=== Women ===
==== 100 meters ====
Prior to the competition, the records were as follows:

World record	Florence Griffith Joyner (USA)	10.49	Indianapolis, United States	16 July 1988
Asian Record	Li Xuemei (CHN)	10.79	Shanghai, China	18 October 1997

Final – 13:30 –

Wind: +1.8 m/s

Rank	Lane	Name	Nationality	Time	Notes
1st place, gold medalist(s)	4	Wei Yongli	China	11.32	
2nd place, silver medalist(s)	7	Yuan Qiqi	China	11.52	
3rd place, bronze medalist(s)	3	Yuki Miyazawa	Japan	11.56	
4	6	Nodoka Seko	Japan	11.70	
5	5	Soo-Kyung Ou	South Korea	12.00	
6	8	Ye-Jin Lee	South Korea	12.20	

==== 400 meters ====
Prior to the competition, the records were as follows:

World record	Marita Koch (GDR)	47.60	Canberra, Australia	6 October 1985
Asian Record	Ma Yuqin (CHN)	49.81	Beijing, China	11 September 1993

Final – 16:10 –

Rank	Lane	Name	Nationality	Time	Notes
1st place, gold medalist(s)	8	Jingwen Chen	China	55.41	
2nd place, silver medalist(s)	6	Eun-Ju Jo	South Korea	56.01	
3rd place, bronze medalist(s)	4	Sayaka Aoki	Japan	56.25	
4	3	Sera Oh	South Korea	56.61	
	5	Chong Cheng	China	DNS	
	7	Sayaka Fujisawa	Japan	DNS	

==== 100 meters hurdles ====
Prior to the competition, the records were as follows:

World record	Yordanka Donkova (BUL)	12.21	Stara Zagora, Bulgaria	20 August 1988
Asian Record	Olga Shishigina (KAZ)	12.44	Luzern, Switzerland	27 June 1995

Final – 14:55 –

Wind: +2.5 m/s

Rank	Lane	Name	Nationality	Time	Notes
1st place, gold medalist(s)	8	Ya Kang	China	13.10	
2nd place, silver medalist(s)	4	Hitomi Shimura	Japan	13.13	
3rd place, bronze medalist(s)	7	Anri Tanaka	Japan	13.23	
4	3	Jung Hye-lim	South Korea	13.25	
5	6	Song Yujin	South Korea	14.33	
	5	Wu Shuijiao	China	DNS	

==== 4 x 100 meters relay ====
Prior to the competition, the records were as follows:

World Record	United States (Tianna Madison, Allyson Felix, Bianca Knight, Carmelita Jeter)	40.82	London, Great Britain	10 August 2012
Asian Record	China (Xiao Lin, Li Yali, Liu Xiaomei, Li Xuemei)	42.23	Shanghai, China	23 October 1997

Final – 16:40 –

Rank	Lane	Nation	Competitors	Time	Notes
1st place, gold medalist(s)	5	China	Tao Yujia; Lingwei Kong; Yuan Qiqi; Wei Yongli	43.09	
2nd place, silver medalist(s)	6	Japan	Yuki Miyazawa; Mizuki Nakamura; Nodoka Seko; Saori Kitakaze	45.08	
3rd place, bronze medalist(s)	4	South Korea	Sunae Lee; Minji Kim; Sockyung Oh; Ye-Jin Lee	46.23	

==== Pole vault ====
Prior to the competition, the records were as follows:

World record	Yelena Isinbayeva (RUS)	5.06	Zürich, Switzerland	28 August 2009
Asian Record	Li Ling (CHN)	4.66	Wuhan, China	6 June 2015

Final – 13:00 –

Rank	Name	Nationality	3.20	3.40	3.80	4.00	4.10	4.15	4.20	4.25	4.30	4.35	Mark	Notes
1st place, gold medalist(s)	Ren Mengqian	China	–	–	–	o	–	xo	–	o	–	xxx	4.25	
2nd place, silver medalist(s)	Lim Eun-ji	South Korea	–	–	–	o	o	–	xo	–	xxx		4.20	
3rd place, bronze medalist(s)	Megumi Nakada	Japan	–	–	xo	o	o	–	xxx				4.10	
4	Chaoqun Li	China	–	–	o	xo	xo	–	xxx				4.10	
5	Minji Jo	South Korea	o	xxx									3.20	
	Kanae Tatsuta	Japan	–	–	xxx								NM	

==== Long jump ====
Prior to the competition, the records were as follows:

World record	Galina Chistyakova (URS)	7.52	Leningrad, Soviet Union	11 June 1988
Asian Record	Yao Weili (CHN)	7.01	Jinan, China	5 June 1993

Final – 13:00 –

Rank	Name	Nationality	#1	#2	#3	#4	#5	#6	Mark	Notes
1st place, gold medalist(s)	Minjia Lu	China	6.33 (+2.2 m/s)	6.54 (+2.3 m/s)	6.21 (+1.6 m/s)	6.33 (+2.2 m/s)	6.16 (+1.3 m/s)	6.04 (+2.9 m/s)	6.54 (+2.3 m/s)	
2nd place, silver medalist(s)	Xiaoxue Zhou	China	6.14 (+3.2 m/s)	6.26 (+3.2 m/s)	6.46 (+2.6 m/s)	6.28 (+2.5 m/s)	6.16 (+1.5 m/s)	6.15 (+2.3 m/s)	6.46 (+2.6 m/s)	
3rd place, bronze medalist(s)	Saeko Okayama	Japan	6.20 (+1.1 m/s)	6.27 (+2.3 m/s)	6.23 (+2.2 m/s)	6.03 (+2.2 m/s)	6.09 (+2.6 m/s)	6.14 (+1.9 m/s)	6.27 (+2.3 m/s)	
4	Yurina Hiraka	Japan	6.13 (+1.9 m/s)	5.98 (+1.0 m/s)	6.08 (+3.2 m/s)	5.93 (+1.7 m/s)	6.13 (+3.2 m/s)	6.08 (+3.5 m/s)	6.13 (+1.9 m/s)	
5	Min-Ji Kim	South Korea	x	5.93 (+2.6 m/s)	5.90 (+1.5 m/s)	5.83 (+2.8 m/s)	6.03 (+2.2 m/s)	4.88 (+4.3 m/s)	6.03 (+2.2 m/s)	
6	Huijin Lee	South Korea	5.84 (+3.1 m/s)	5.90 (+3.0 m/s)	5.92 (+1.6 m/s)	5.51 (+1.1 m/s)	5.65 (+1.4 m/s)	5.68 (-1.1 m/s)	5.92 (+1.6 m/s)	

==== Shot put ====
Prior to the competition, the records were as follows:

World Record	Natalya Lisovskaya (URS)	22.63	Moscow, Soviet Union	7 June 1987
Asian Record	Li Meisu (CHN)	21.76	Shijiazhuang, China	23 April 1988

Final – 13:00 –

Rank	Athlete	Nationality	#1	#2	#3	#4	#5	#6	Mark	Notes
1st place, gold medalist(s)	Ka Bian	China	17.07	16.96	17.77	x	x	x	17.77	
2nd place, silver medalist(s)	Liu Xiangrong	China	15.92	15.88	x	15.81	15.74	x	15.92	
3rd place, bronze medalist(s)	Aya Ota	Japan	14.93	15.53	15.43	15.38	15.30	14.83	15.53	
4	Mina Lee	South Korea	x	x	14.54	x	14.76	14.96	14.96	
5	Shoko Matusuda	Japan	14.08	13.57	14.03	13.31	13.88	x	14.08	
6	Yusun Jeong	South Korea	13.52	13.75	13.64	13.13	13.05	13.24	13.75	
