= 2006 World Junior Championships in Athletics – Men's pole vault =

The men's pole vault event at the 2006 World Junior Championships in Athletics was held in Beijing, China, at Chaoyang Sports Centre on 17 and 19 August.

== Medalists ==
Gold	Germán Chiaraviglio; Argentina
Silver	Yang Yansheng; China
Bronze	Leonid Kivalov; Russia

== Results ==
=== Final ===
19 August

Rank	Name	Nationality	Result	Notes
1st place, gold medalist(s)	Germán Chiaraviglio	Argentina	5.71	
2nd place, silver medalist(s)	Yang Yansheng	China	5.54	
3rd place, bronze medalist(s)	Leonid Kivalov	Russia	5.42	
4	Mateusz Didenkow	Poland	5.30	
5	Jan Kudlička	Czech Republic	5.30	
5	Raphael Holzdeppe	Germany	5.30	
5	Pavel Prokopenko	Russia	5.30	
8	Łukasz Michalski	Poland	5.30	
9	Luke Cutts	United Kingdom	5.30	
10	Marvin Reitze	Germany	5.20	
11	Li Kang	China	5.20	
12	Denis Goossens	Belgium	5.20	
13	Loïc Martinot	France	5.10	
13	Scott Roth	United States	5.10	
	Sergey Horovy	Ukraine	NH	

=== Qualifications ===
17 August

==== Group A ====
Rank	Name	Nationality	Result	Notes
1	Li Kang	China	5.20	Q
2	Pavel Prokopenko	Russia	5.20	Q
3	Jan Kudlička	Czech Republic	5.20	Q
4	Germán Chiaraviglio	Argentina	5.15	q
4	Marvin Reitze	Germany	5.15	q
4	Łukasz Michalski	Poland	5.15	q
7	Luke Cutts	United Kingdom	5.15	q
8	Loïc Martinot	France	5.15	q
9	Scott Roth	United States	5.15	q
10	Hiroki Ogita	Japan	5.10	
11	Matt Boyd	Australia	5.00	
11	Luís Fernando Moro	Spain	5.00	
13	Wim Verelst	Belgium	5.00	
	Taylor Petrucha	Canada	NH	

==== Group B ====
Rank	Name	Nationality	Result	Notes
1	Yang Yansheng	China	5.20	Q
2	Leonid Kivalov	Russia	5.20	Q
3	Raphael Holzdeppe	Germany	5.15	q
3	Mateusz Didenkow	Poland	5.15	q
3	Sergey Horovy	Ukraine	5.15	q
6	Denis Goossens	Belgium	5.15	q
7	Eemeli Salomäki	Finland	5.10	
8	Dimítrios Patsoukákis	Greece	5.10	
9	Dezső Szabó	Hungary	5.10	
10	Wout van Wengerden	Netherlands	5.00	
11	Takafumi Suzuki	Japan	5.00	
12	Vincent Marc	France	4.80	
13	Rasmus Jørgensen	Denmark	4.80	
14	Phil Hanson	United States	4.80	

== Participation ==
According to an unofficial count, 28 athletes from 20 countries participated in the event.

- Argentina (1)
- Australia (1)
- Belgium (2)
- Canada (1)
- China (2)
- Czech Republic (1)
- Denmark (1)
- Finland (1)
- France (2)
- Germany (2)
- Greece (1)
- Hungary (1)
- Japan (2)
- Netherlands (1)
- Poland (2)
- Russia (2)
- Spain (1)
- Ukraine (1)
- United Kingdom (1)
- United States (2)
