= 2009 European Athletics U23 Championships – Men's pole vault =

The men's pole vault event at the 2009 European Athletics U23 Championships was held in Kaunas, Lithuania, at S. Dariaus ir S. Girėno stadionas (Darius and Girėnas Stadium) on 17 and 19 July.

== Medalists ==
Gold	Raphael Holzdeppe; Germany
Silver	Luke Cutts; United Kingdom
Bronze	Dimitrios Patsoukakis; Greece

== Results ==
=== Final ===
19 July

Rank	Name	Nationality	Attempts									Result	Notes
Rank	Name	Nationality	5.00	5.15	5.30	5.40	5.50	5.55	5.60	5.65	5.70	Result	Notes
1st place, gold medalist(s)	Raphael Holzdeppe	Germany	–	–	–	o	–	xo	–	o	x	5.65	
2nd place, silver medalist(s)	Luke Cutts	United Kingdom	–	o	x	o	xo	xo	xxo	x–	xx	5.60	
3rd place, bronze medalist(s)	Dimitrios Patsoukakis	Greece	–	o	xo	o	o	o	xx–	x		5.55	
4	Eemeli Salomäki	Finland	–	o	o	xo	xo	x–	xx			5.50	
5	Łukasz Michalski	Poland	–	–	o	xo	xxo	–	xxx			5.50	
6	Stevy Dume	France	o	–	o	xo	xx–	x				5.40	
7	Yevgeniy Ageyev	Russia	xxo	xxo	o	xo	xxx					5.40	
8	Denis Goossens	Belgium	–	o	xxx							5.15	
8	Jan Kudlička	Czech Republic	–	o	xxx							5.15	
8	Ivan Gertleyn	Russia	–	o	xxx							5.15	
11	Flavien Basson	France	xo	xo	xxx							5.15	
12	Wout van Wengerden	Netherlands	–	xxo	xxx							5.15	

=== Qualifications ===
17 July
Qualifying perf. 5.40 or 12 to the Final

==== Group A ====
Rank	Name	Nationality	Result	Notes
1	Raphael Holzdeppe	Germany	5.40	Q
2	Ivan Gertleyn	Russia	5.40	Q
3	Jan Kudlička	Czech Republic	5.40	Q
4	Yevgeniy Ageyev	Russia	5.30	q
4	Stevy Dume	France	5.30	q
6	Luke Cutts	United Kingdom	5.30	q
7	Jere Bergius	Finland	5.20	
8	Stefanos Koufidis	Greece	5.20	
9	Edi Maia	Portugal	5.20	
10	Jorn Bakker	Netherlands	5.10	
	Luis Fernando Moro	Portugal	DNS	

==== Group B ====
Rank	Name	Nationality	Result	Notes
1	Eemeli Salomäki	Finland	5.40	Q
1	Łukasz Michalski	Poland	5.40	Q
3	Wout van Wengerden	Netherlands	5.40	Q
4	Denis Goossens	Belgium	5.40	Q
5	Dimitrios Patsoukakis	Greece	5.30	q
6	Flavien Basson	France	5.30	q
7	Albert Vélez	Spain	5.20	
7	Karsten Dilla	Germany	5.20	
7	Pavel Prokopenko	Russia	5.20	
10	Rasmus Wejnold Jørgensen	Denmark	5.10	
11	Jouni Marjaniemi	Finland	4.95	

== Participation ==
According to an unofficial count, 21 athletes from 13 countries participated in the event.

- Belgium (1)
- Czech Republic (1)
- Denmark (1)
- Finland (3)
- France (2)
- Germany (2)
- Greece (2)
- Netherlands (2)
- Poland (1)
- Portugal (1)
- Russia (3)
- Spain (1)
- United Kingdom (1)
