= China–Japan–Korea Friendship Athletic Meeting =

Annual international athletics event

- Sport: Track and field
- Founded: 2014
- Country: China, Japan, South Korea

The China–Japan–Korea Friendship Athletic Meeting (Japanese: 日中韓3カ国交流陸上競技大会) is an annual international outdoor track and field competition between the East Asian countries of China, Japan and South Korea. Jointly organised by the Chinese Athletic Association, Japan Association of Athletics Federations and Korea Association of Athletics Federations, it was first held in 2014 and host responsibilities rotate between the three nations.

A total of fourteen events are contested, divided evenly between the sexes, with eight track running events, four jumps, and two shot put events. Each nation enters two athletes per individual event and points are awarded based on finishing position, with 10 for first, 8 for second, 7 for third, 6 for fourth, 5 for fifth and 4 for sixth.

The competition builds upon a long-running under-20 athletics competition between the nations.

The 2020 edition of the meeting was postponed and then canceled due to the COVID-19 pandemic. The 2021 and 2022 editions were also cancelled. There was an international competition between Japan and South Korea in 2023, but it did not include athletics.

== Editions ==
Ed.	Year	Dates	Venue	Host city	Host country	Winner	Runner-up	Third
1	2014	6 July	Jinhua Stadium	Jinhua	China	China	Japan	South Korea
2	2015	12 July	Sapporo Atsubetsu Stadium	Sapporo	Japan	China	Japan	South Korea
3	2016	3 July	Gimcheon Stadium	Gimcheon	South Korea	China	Japan	South Korea
4	2017	2 July	Ningbo Fubang Stadium	Ningbo	China	China	South Korea	Japan
5	2018	8 July	Sapporo Atsubetsu Stadium	Sapporo	Japan			
6	2019	15 June	Gimcheon Stadium	Gimcheon	South Korea	China	Japan	South Korea

== Events ==
- Men's events
  - 200 metres
  - 800 metres
  - 400 metres hurdles
  - 4 × 400 metres relay
  - High jump
  - Triple jump
  - Shot put
- Women's events
  - 100 metres
  - 400 metres
  - 100 metres hurdles
  - 4 × 100 metres relay
  - Pole vault
  - Long jump
  - Shot put

== See also ==
- China–Japan–South Korea relations
- China–Japan–South Korea trilateral summit
