= Mateusz Didenkow =

Polish pole vaulter

Mateusz Didenkow (born 22 April 1987 in Gdynia) is a retired Polish track and field athlete who competed in the pole vault. His personal best for the event is 5.75 metres, set in 2011.

Competing as a junior athlete, he placed sixth at the 2005 European Athletics Junior Championships, then improved to fourth place at the 2006 World Junior Championships in Athletics in Beijing. After ranking ninth at the 2007 European Athletics U23 Championships, he made his senior debut at the 2009 European Athletics Indoor Championships, where he was eleventh in the qualifying round. He made it through to the final round at the 2010 European Athletics Championships, but was again eleventh overall.

He achieved a personal best clearance of 5.75 m at the 2011 Summer Universiade to win his first international medal (sharing the silver medal with Aleksandr Gripich). He managed this height again at the 2011 World Championships in Athletics, which ranked him seventh in the final (his compatriot Paweł Wojciechowski won the gold).

== Achievements ==
Year	Competition	Venue	Position	Notes
Representing Poland
2005	European Junior Championships	Kaunas, Lithuania	6th	5.10 m
2006	World Junior Championships	Beijing, China	4th	5.30 m
2007	European U23 Championships	Debrecen, Hungary	9th	5.30 m
2009	European Indoor Championships	Turin, Italy	11th (q)	5.55 m
2010	European Championships	Barcelona, Spain	11th	5.50 m
2011	Universiade	Shenzhen, China	2nd	5.75 m (PB)
2011	World Championships	Daegu, South Korea	7th	5.75 m (=PB)
