= 2014 China–Japan–Korea Friendship Athletic Meeting =

1st China–Japan–Korea Friendship Athletic Meeting
- Dates: 6 July 2014
- Host city: Jinhua, China
- Venue: Jinhua Sport Center
- Level: Senior
- Events: 14 (7 men, 7 women)
- Participation: 3 nations
- Records set: 1 national records

The 1st China–Japan–Korea Friendship Athletic Meeting was held at the Jinhua Sport Center in Jinhua, China on July 6, 2014.

== Medal summary ==
=== Men ===
Event	Gold		Silver		Bronze	
100 metres	Xinyue Pan (CHN)	10.22	Kim Kuk-young (KOR)	10.24	Yu Onabuta (JPN)	10.40
400 metres	Naoki Kobayashi (JPN)	45.79	Seong Hyeok-je (KOR)	46.36	Hideyuki Hirose (JPN)	46.54
110 metres hurdles	Xie Wenjun (CHN)	13.55	Lee Jung-joon (KOR)	13.67	Yutaro Furukawa (JPN)	13.70
4 × 100 metres relay	South Korea; Oh Kyung-soo; Cho Kyu-won; Kim Kuk-young; Yeo Ho-su-a	38.74 NR	China; Lin Renkeng; Ma Jianliang; Wang Zezhi; Pan Xinyue	38.99	Japan; Yu Onabuta; Naoki Tsukahara; Takumi Kuki; Shota Hara	40.72
Pole vault	Jin Min-sub (KOR)	5.65	Yao Jie (CHN)	5.60	Hiroki Ogita (JPN)	5.40
Long jump	Gao Xinglong (CHN)	8.18	Tang Gongchen (CHN)	8.06	Kota Minemura (JPN)	7.90
Javelin throw	Zhao Qinggang (CHN)	77.38	Yuya Koriki (JPN)	74.11	Kohei Hasegawa (JPN)	73.99

=== Women ===
Event	Gold		Silver		Bronze	
200 metres	Yuan Qiqi (CHN)	23.94	Joung Hansol (KOR)	24.09	Rio Banno (JPN)	24.19
800 metres	Zheng Xiaoqian (CHN)	2:07.43	He Yuting (CHN)	2:07.49	Shin Mi-ran (KOR)	2:08.07
400 metres hurdles	Manami Kira (JPN)	56.79	Sayaka Aoki (JPN)	57.51	Deng Xiaoqing (CHN)	57.95
4 × 400 metres relay	Japan; Aki Odagaki; Asami Chiba; Kana Ichikawa; Manami Kira	3:32.46	China; Lai Meiting; Chen Jingwen; Wang Huan; Yang Huizhen	3:35.85	South Korea; Min Ji-hyun; Yok Jee-eun; Park Mi-jin; Jo Eun-ju	3:39.91
High jump	Wang Lin (CHN)	1.84	Seok Mi-jung (KOR)	1.80	Yuki Watanabe (JPN)	1.75
Triple jump	Deng Lina (CHN)	13.82	Bae Chan-mi (KOR)	13.49	Wang Rong (CHN)	13.45
Javelin throw	Song Xiaodan (CHN)	55.29	Zhang Li (CHN)	55.02	Orie Ushiro (JPN)	53.55

== Score table ==
Place	Gold	Silver	Bronze	4th	5th	6th
Points	10	8	7	6	5	4

Event		CHN		JPN		KOR	
100 metres	M	10	5	7	6	8	4
200 metres	W	10	6	7	5	8	4
400 metres	M	6	5	10	7	8	–
800 metres	W	10	8	6	5	7	4
110 metre hurdles	M	10	6	7	4	8	5
400 metre hurdles	W	7	4	10	8	6	5
4 x 100 metres relay	M	8		7		10	
4 x 400 metres relay	W	8		10		7	
High jump	W	10	5.5?	7	4	8	5.5?
Pole vault	M	8	5	7	4	10	6
Long jump	M	10	8	7	5	6	4
Triple jump	W	10	7	6	5	8	4
Javelin throw	M	10	6	8	7	5	4
Javelin throw	W	10	8	7	4	6	5

The host country is highlighted in lavender blue

=== Overall ===
Rank	Nation	Gold	Silver	Bronze	4th	5th	6th	Score
1	China	9	6	2	5	3	1	200.5
2	Japan	3	2	10	3	4	4	170
3	Korea	2	6	2	5	4	6	155.5

=== Men ===
Rank	Nation	Gold	Silver	Bronze	4th	5th	6th	Score
1	China	4	3	–	3	3	–	97
2	Japan	1	1	7	1	1	2	86
3	Korea	2	3	–	2	2	3	78

=== Women ===
Rank	Nation	Gold	Silver	Bronze	4th	5th	6th	Score
1	China	5	3	2	2	–	1	103.5
2	Japan	2	1	3	2	3	2	84
3	Korea	–	3	2	3	2	3	77.5

== Results ==
=== Men ===
==== 100 meters ====
Prior to the competition, the records were as follows:

World record	Usain Bolt (JAM)	9.58	Berlin, Germany	16 August 2009
Asian Record	Samuel Francis (QAT)	9.99	Amman, Jordan	26 July 2007

Final – 19:50 –

Wind: +1.0 m/s

Rank	Lane	Name	Nationality	Time	Notes
1st place, gold medalist(s)	6	Pan Xinyue	China	10.22	
2nd place, silver medalist(s)	4	Kim Kuk-young	South Korea	10.24	
3rd place, bronze medalist(s)	3	Yu Onabuta	Japan	10.40	
4	5	Naoki Tsukahara	Japan	10.43	
5	2	Wang Zezhi	China	10.48	
6	7	Yeo Ho-su-a	South Korea	10.53	

==== 400 meters ====
Prior to the competition, the records were as follows:

World record	Michael Johnson (USA)	43.18	Seville, Spain	26 August 1999
Asian Record	Yousef Masrahi (KSA)	44.43	Lausanne, Switzerland	3 July 2014

Final – 19:10 –

Rank	Lane	Name	Nationality	Time	Notes
1st place, gold medalist(s)	7	Naoki Kobayashi	Japan	45.79	
2nd place, silver medalist(s)	5	Seong Hyeok-je	South Korea	46.36	
3rd place, bronze medalist(s)	4	Hideyuki Hirose	Japan	46.54	
4	6	Lu Zhiquan	China	46.91	
5	3	Huang Zhenfei	China	48.14	

==== 110 meters hurdles ====
Prior to the competition, the records were as follows:

World record	Aries Merritt (USA)	12.80	Brussels, Belgium	7 September 2012
Asian Record	Liu Xiang (CHN)	12.88	Lausanne, Switzerland	11 July 2006

Final – 20:10 –

Wind: +2.5 m/s

Rank	Lane	Name	Nationality	Time	Notes
1st place, gold medalist(s)	4	Xie Wenjun	China	13.55	
2nd place, silver medalist(s)	5	Lee Jung-joon	South Korea	13.67	
3rd place, bronze medalist(s)	3	Yutaro Furukawa	Japan	13.70	
4	7	Huang Hao	China	13.72	
5	2	Kim Byoung-jun	South Korea	13.73	
6	6	Hiroyuki Sato	Japan	14.28	

==== 4 x 100 meters relay ====
Prior to the competition, the records were as follows:

World Record	Jamaica (Nesta Carter, Michael Frater, Yohan Blake, Usain Bolt)	36.84	London, Great Britain	11 August 2012
Asian Record	Japan (Naoki Tsukahara, Shingo Suetsugu, Shinji Takahira, Nobuharu Asahara)	38.03	Osaka, Japan	1 September 2007

Final – 20:40 –

Rank	Lane	Nation	Competitors	Time	Notes
1st place, gold medalist(s)	5	South Korea	Oh Kyung-soo; Cho Kyu-won; Kim Kuk-young; Yeo Ho-su-a	38.74	NR
2nd place, silver medalist(s)	4	China	Lin Renkeng; Ma Jianliang; Wang Zezhi; Pan Xinyue	38.99	
3rd place, bronze medalist(s)	3	Japan	Yu Onabuta; Naoki Tsukahara; Takumi Kuki; Shota Hara	40.72	

==== Pole vault ====
Prior to the competition, the records were as follows:

World record	Renaud Lavillenie (FRA)	6.16	Donetsk, Ukraine	15 February 2014
Asian Record	Igor Potapovich (KAZ)	5.92	Stockholm, Sweden	19 February 1998

Final – 19:25 –

Rank	Name	Nationality	5.10	5.20	5.30	5.40	5.50	5.60	5.65	5.70	Mark	Notes
1st place, gold medalist(s)	Jin Min-sub	South Korea	–	–	o	–	o	xx–	o	xxx	5.65	
2nd place, silver medalist(s)	Yao Jie	China	–	–	o	xo	xxo	o	–	xxx	5.60	
3rd place, bronze medalist(s)	Hiroki Ogita	Japan	–	–	xo	o	xxx				5.40	
4	Han Du-hyeon	South Korea	–	xxo	xxo	xxx					5.30	
5	Huang Bokai	China	xo	o	xxx						5.20	
6	Hiroki Sasase	Japan	–	xo	xxx						5.20	

==== Long jump ====
Prior to the competition, the records were as follows:

World record	Mike Powell (USA)	8.95	Tokyo, Japan	30 August 1991
Asian Record	Mohamed Al-Khuwalidi (KSA)	8.48	Sotteville, France	2 July 2006

Final – 20:15 –

Rank	Name	Nationality	#1	#2	#3	#4	#5	#6	Mark	Notes
1st place, gold medalist(s)	Gao Xinglong	China	7.88 (+1.2 m/s)	8.18 (+1.4 m/s)	x	8.12 (+2.1 m/s)	5.53 (+0.6 m/s)	–	8.18 (+1.4 m/s)	
2nd place, silver medalist(s)	Tang Gongchen	China	8.06 (+2.0 m/s)	x	7.94	7.97	7.87	x	8.06 (+2.0 m/s)	
3rd place, bronze medalist(s)	Kota Minemura	Japan	7.89 (+.2 m/s)	x	x	7.77 (+1.2 m/s)	7.90 (+1.5 m/s)	x	7.90 (+1.5 m/s)	
4	Kim Sang-yun	South Korea	x	7.61 (+1.2 m/s)	x	7.60 (+0.9 m/s)	7.67 (+1.1 m/s)	x	7.67 (+1.1 m/s)	
5	Tomoya Takamasa	Japan	x	7.59 (+0.9 m/s)	7.60 (+0.2 m/s)	6.11 (-0.1 m/s)	7.30 (+1.6 m/s)	7.56 (+0.5 m/s)	7.60 (+0.2 m/s)	
6	Joo Eun-jae	South Korea	7.27 (+0.9 m/s)	x	x	7.42 (+1.3 m/s)	7.55 (+0.7 m/s)	x	7.55 (+0.7 m/s)	

==== Javelin throw ====
Prior to the competition, the records were as follows:

World Record	Jan Železný (CZE)	98.48	Jena, Germany	25 May 1996
Asian Record	Kazuhiro Mizoguchi (JPN)	87.60	San Jose, United States	19 February 1998

Final – 19:05 –

Rank	Athlete	Nationality	#1	#2	#3	#4	#5	#6	Mark	Notes
1st place, gold medalist(s)	Zhao Qinggang	China	73.38	75.21	x	74.80	x	77.38	77.38	
2nd place, silver medalist(s)	Yuya Koriki	Japan	68.47	74.11	x	66.42	–	71.61	74.11	
3rd place, bronze medalist(s)	Kohei Hasegawa	Japan	68.55	72.51	73.99	72.92	x	71.03	73.99	
4	Bin Song	China	71.59	–	–	69.00	–	–	71.59	
5	Kim Ye-ram	South Korea	61.59	x	67.83	x	68.06	64.77	68.06	
6	Choe Deok-yeong	South Korea	56.72	63.85	60.33	x	x	60.45	63.85	

=== Women ===
==== 200 meters ====
Prior to the competition, the records were as follows:

World record	Florence Griffith Joyner (USA)	21.34	Seoul, South Korea	29 September 1988
Asian Record	Li Xuemei (CHN)	22.01	Shanghai, China	22 October 1997

Final – 19:30 –

Wind: +1.2 m/s

Rank	Lane	Name	Nationality	Time	Notes
1st place, gold medalist(s)	2	Yuan Qiqi	China	23.94	
2nd place, silver medalist(s)	6	Joung Hansol	South Korea	24.09	
3rd place, bronze medalist(s)	7	Rio Banno	Japan	24.19	
4	5	Kong Lingwei	China	24.20	
5	4	Tomoka Tsuchihashi	Japan	24.21	
6	3	Kim Cho-rong	South Korea	24.48	

==== 800 meters ====
Prior to the competition, the records were as follows:

World record	Jarmila Kratochvílová (TCH)	1:53.28	Munich, West Germany	26 July 1983
Asian Record	Liu Dong (CHN)	1:55.54	Beijing, China	9 September 1993

Final – 20:30 –

Rank	Lane	Name	Nationality	Time	Notes
1st place, gold medalist(s)	4	Zheng Xiaoqian	China	2:07.43	
2nd place, silver medalist(s)	7	He Yuting	China	2:07.49	
3rd place, bronze medalist(s)	6	Shin Mi-ran	South Korea	2:08.07	
4	5	Mariko Takeuchi	Japan	2:08.63	
5	3	Yukina Tanimoto	Japan	2:08.71	
6	2	Park Young-sun	South Korea	2:16.01	

==== 400 meters hurdles ====
Prior to the competition, the records were as follows:

World record	Yuliya Pechonkina (RUS)	52.34	Tula, Russia	8 August 2003
Asian Record	Han Qing (CHN)	53.96	Beijing, China	9 September 1993
Asian Record	Song Yinglan (CHN)	53.96	Guangzhou, China	22 November 2001

Final – 19:00 –

Rank	Lane	Name	Nationality	Time	Notes
1st place, gold medalist(s)	2	Manami Kira	Japan	56.79	
2nd place, silver medalist(s)	6	Sayaka Aoki	Japan	57.51	
3rd place, bronze medalist(s)	5	Deng Xiaoqing	China	57.95	
4	4	Jo Eun-ju	South Korea	58.74	
5	7	Hee Jung-young	South Korea	59.25	
6	3	Wang Huan	China	59.26	

==== 4 x 400 meters relay ====
Prior to the competition, the records were as follows:

World Record	Soviet Union (Tatyana Ledovskaya, Olga Nazarova, Mariya Pinigina, Olga Bryzgina)	3:15.17	Seoul, South Korea	1 October 1988
Asian Record	China (An Xiaohong, Bai Xiaoyun, Cao Chunying, Ma Yuqin)	3:24.28	Beijing, China	13 September 1993

Final – 20:50 –

Rank	Lane	Nation	Competitors	Time	Notes
1st place, gold medalist(s)	4	Japan	Aki Odagaki; Asami Chiba; Kana Ichikawa; Manami Kira	3:32.46	
2nd place, silver medalist(s)	5	China	Lai Meiting; Chen Jingwen; Wang Huan; Yang Huizhen	3:35.85	
3rd place, bronze medalist(s)	3	South Korea	Min Ji-hyun; Yok Jee-eun; Park Mi-jin; Jo Eun-ju	3:39.91	

==== High jump ====
Prior to the competition, the records were as follows:

World record	Stefka Kostadinova (BUL)	2.09	Rome, Italy	30 August 1987
Asian Record	Marina Aitova (KAZ)	1.99	Athens, Greece	13 July 2009

Final – 19:45 –

Rank	Name	Nationality	1.20	1.65	1.70	1.75	1.80	1.84	1.88	Mark	Notes
1st place, gold medalist(s)	Wang Lin	China	–	o	o	o	o	xo	xxx	1.84	
2nd place, silver medalist(s)	Seok Mi-jung	South Korea	–	o	o	xxo	xo	xxx		1.80	
3rd place, bronze medalist(s)	Yuki Watanabe	Japan	–	o	o	o	xxx			1.75	
4	Han Darye	South Korea	–	o	o	xo	xxx			1.75	
4	Zhao Jian	China	–	o	o	xo	xxx			1.75	
6	Nanami Inoue	Japan	–	o	o	xxx				1.70	

==== Triple jump ====
Prior to the competition, the records were as follows:

World record	Inessa Kravets (UKR)	15.50	Gothenburg, Sweden	10 August 1995
Asian Record	Olga Rypakova (KAZ)	15.25	Croatia, Croatia	4 September 2010

Final – 19:15 –

Rank	Name	Nationality	#1	#2	#3	#4	#5	#6	Mark	Notes
1st place, gold medalist(s)	Deng Lina	China	13.66 (+1.1 m/s)	x	13.80 (+1.1 m/s)	x	13.82 (+1.8 m/s)	x	13.82 (+1.8 m/s)	
2nd place, silver medalist(s)	Bae Chan-mi	South Korea	12.84 (+1.2 m/s)	x	x	13.49 (+0.1 m/s)	x	13.46 (+1.4 m/s)	13.49 (+0.1 m/s)	
3rd place, bronze medalist(s)	Wang Rong	China	13.31 (+1.9 m/s)	13.45 (+1.2 m/s)	13.26 (+1.2 m/s)	13.28 (-0.3 m/s)	x	13.44 (+0.5 m/s)	13.45 (+1.2 m/s)	
4	Waka Maeda	Japan	x	x	13.17 (+1.4 m/s)	13.00 (+0.8 m/s)	13.03 (+1.0 m/s)	x	13.17 (+1.4 m/s)	
5	Mayu Yoshida	Japan	x	13.10 (+1.8 m/s)	12.73 (+0.4 m/s)	12.67 (+0.3 m/s)	12.91 (+2.3 m/s)	12.95 (+1.6 m/s)	13.10 (+1.8 m/s)	
6	Kim Ju-eun	South Korea	12.39 (+1.8 m/s)	x	11.28 (+1.0 m/s)	11.36 (+1.3 m/s)	12.17 (-0.4 m/s)	x	12.39 (+1.8 m/s)	

==== Javelin throw ====
Prior to the competition, the records were as follows:

World Record	Barbora Špotáková (CZE)	72.28	Stuttgart, Germany	13 September 2008
Asian Record	Lü Huihui (CHN)	65.62	Zhaoqing, China	27 April 2013

Final – 20:05 –

Rank	Athlete	Nationality	#1	#2	#3	#4	#5	#6	Mark	Notes
1st place, gold medalist(s)	Song Xiaodan	China	51.62	48.30	x	55.29	52.29	x	55.29	
2nd place, silver medalist(s)	Zhang Li	China	55.02	x	x	x	x	51.11	55.02	
3rd place, bronze medalist(s)	Orie Ushiro	Japan	52.89	51.54	46.68	53.55	48.40	49.58	53.55	
4	Seo Hae-an	South Korea	52.01	50.33	48.71	51.69	50.50	50.62	52.01	
5	Kim Kyung-ae	South Korea	48.31	50.77	x	50.69	50.33	51.64	51.64	
6	Haruka Matoba	Japan	46.68	46.91	47.24	50.11	47.21	45.16	50.11	
