= 2019 China–Japan–Korea Friendship Athletic Meeting =

- Dates: 15 June 2019
- Host city: Gimcheon, Korea
- Venue: Gimcheon Stadium
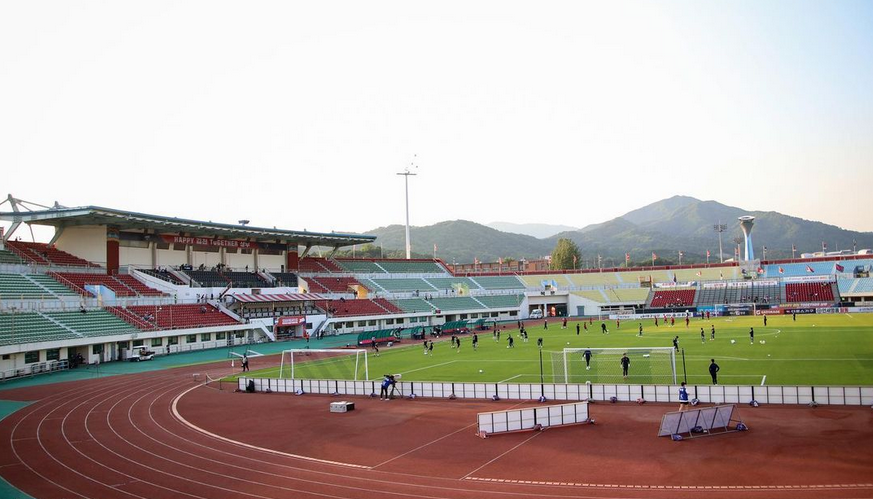
- Level: Senior
- Participation: 3 nations

The 6th China–Japan–Korea Friendship Athletic Meeting was held at the Gimcheon Stadium in Gimcheon, Korea on 15 June 2019.

China topped the medal tables with eight gold medals.

== Medal summary ==
=== Men ===
Event	Gold		Silver		Bronze	
200 metres	Keigo Yasuda (JPN)	20.94	Reona Miura (JPN)	20.97	Lin Junhong (CHN)	21.14
800 metres	Li Junlin (CHN)	1:52.36	Riku Sakamoto (JPN)	1:52.98	Lee Seung-lin (KOR)	1:53.00
400 metres hurdles	Hiromu Yamauchi (JPN)	50.85	Cai Junqi (CHN)	51.04	Hwang Hyun-woo (KOR)	51.22
4 × 100 metres relay	China; Yang Yang; Mo Youxue; Luo Wenyi; Lin Junhong	39.50	South Korea; Kim Kuk-young; Park Sie-young; Lee Kyu-hyung; Kim Min-kyun	40.16		
4 × 400 metres relay	South Korea; Mo Il-hwan; Lim Chan-ho; Suh Jae-young; Kim Ui-yeon	3:07.14	Japan; Syuji Mori; Muuto Kidachi; Kosuke Shoji; Tomokiho Mathuoka	3:07.72	China; Wu Lei; Cai Junqi; Li Junlin; Pan Haitao	3:11.45
High jump	Naoto Hasegawa (JPN)	2.19 m	Woo Sang-hyeok (KOR)	2.19 m	Ryoichi Akamatsu (JPN)	2.16 m
Triple jump	Kim Jang-woo (KOR)	15.94 m	Yu Kyu-min (KOR)	15.76 m	Riku Ito (JPN)	14.86 m
Shot put	Chen Jian (CHN)	19.12 m	Jung Il-woo (KOR)	18.81 m	Feng Jie (CHN)	18.46 m

=== Women ===
Event	Gold		Silver		Bronze	
100 metres	Ding Chao (CHN)	11.58	Liu Qun (CHN)	11.70	Sayaka Shibayama (JPN)	11.91
400 metres	He Ke (CHN)	55.02	Fu Na (CHN)	55.24	Yang Ye-Bin (KOR)	55.65
100 metres hurdles	Yumi Tanaka (JPN)	13.44	Shi Jiali (CHN)	13.59	Hikari Tanaka (JPN)	13.84
4 × 100 metres relay	China; Liu Qun; Ding Chao; Huang Jiaxin; Shi Jiali	45.12	South Korea; Oh Soo-kyung; Lee Min-jeong; Han Ye-sooi; Lee Hyeon-hee	45.89	Japan; Sayaka Shibayama; Yumi Tanaka; Aiko Iki; Hikari Tanaka	46.28
4 × 400 metres relay	China; Tong Zenghuan; Liao Mengxue; Fu Na; Yang Huizhen	3:40.24	South Korea; Yang Ye-bin; An Gyeon-grin; Kim Jie-un; Lee Ji-young	3:45.38		
Pole vault	Mayu Nasu (JPN)	4.20 m	Kanae Tatsuta (JPN)	4.10 m	Shin Soo-young (KOR)	3.60 m
Long jump	Sumire Hata (JPN)	6.17 m	Lee Hui-Jin (KOR)	6.00 m	Yu Minemura (JPN)	5.91 m
Shot put	Zhang Linru (CHN)	17.13 m	Guo Tianqian (CHN)	16.74 m	Lee Soo-kyung (KOR)	15.74 m

== Medal table ==
Rank	Nation	Gold	Silver	Bronze	Total
1	China (CHN)	8	5	3	16
2	Japan (JPN)	6	4	6	16
3	South Korea (KOR)	2	7	5	14
Totals (3 entries)		16	16	14	46
