= Eemeli Salomäki =

Finnish pole vaulter

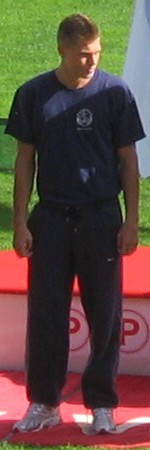
Eemeli Salomäki in Kalevan kisat 2008

Eemeli Niko Antero Salomäki (born 11 October 1987 in Turku) is a Finnish pole vaulter.

He competed at the World Junior Championships in 2006 and at the World Championships in 2009 without reaching the final.

His personal best vault is 5.60 metres, achieved in August 2009 in Espoo.

In the 2010 season he equalled his personal best mark at the 2010 European Athletics Championships, but this mark was not enough to gain him qualification into the final. He focused on the Finnish Elite Games meeting series that summer and placed third overall in the jackpot rankings after winning the Joensuu meet.

== Achievements ==
Year	Competition	Venue	Position	Notes
Representing Finland
2006	World Junior Championships	Beijing, China	17th (q)	5.10 m
2008	Finnish Championships	Tampere, Finland	1st	5.35 m
2009	European U23 Championships	Kaunas, Lithuania	4th	5.50 m
2009	Finnish Championships	Espoo, Finland	1st	5.60 m
2009	World Championships	Berlin, Germany	20th (q)	5.40 m
2010	European Championships	Barcelona, Spain	13th (q)	5.60 m
2011	Universiade	Shenzhen, China	13th (q)	5.20 m
2012	European Championships	Helsinki, Finland	16th (q)	5.30 m
2013	European Indoor Championships	Gothenburg, Sweden	21st (q)	5.40 m
