= 2009 Finnish Athletics Championships =

The 2009 Finnish Athletics Championships were held in the Leppävaaran stadion in Espoo from July 31 to August 2, 2009. The event served as a qualification tournament for the 2009 World Championships staged from August 15 to August 23, 2009, in Berlin, Germany.

== Results ==
Event	Men's Track Winners		Women's Track Winners	
Event	Name	Mark	Name	Mark
100 metres August 1	Jarkko Ruostekivi	10,48	Sari Keskitalo	11,90
200 metres August 2	Visa Hongisto	21,27	Sari Keskitalo	24,34
400 metres August 1	Matti Välimäki	47,55	Karin Storbacka	53,87
800 metres August 2	Mikko Lahtio	1.52,84	Karin Storbacka	2.05,11
1,500 metres August 1	Jukka Keskisalo	3.39,65	Mari Järvenpää	4.27,49
5,000 metres August 2 – July 31	Lewis Korir	13.50,87	Annemari Sandell-Hyvärinen	16.11,61
10,000 metres July 31 – August 2	Lewis Korir	28.46,68	Annemari Sandell-Hyvärinen	33.44,16
110 m/100m Hurdles; July 31	Juha Sonck	13,79	Johanna Halkoaho	13,48
400m Hurdles; August 2	Jussi Heikkilä	50,84	Ilona Ranta	57,82
3,000 m Steeplechase; July 31 – August 2	Joonas Harjamäki	8.48,81	Sandra Eriksson	10.06,83
20 km/10 km Race Walk; July 31	Jarkko Kinnunen	1:27.30	Karoliina Kaasalainen	47.22
Event	Men's Field Winners		Women's Field Winners	
Event	Name	Mark	Name	Mark
High Jump; August 2 – July 31	Oskari Frösén	2.22 m	Hanna Grobler	1.87 m
Pole Vault; August 1 – August 2	Eemeli Salomäki	5.60 m	Minna Nikkanen	4.15 m
Long Jump; August 1	Tommi Evilä	8.19 m	Noora Pesola	6.23 m
Triple Jump; August 2	Aleksi Tammentie	16.19 m	Kristiina Mäkelä	13.07 m
Shot Put; July 31 – August 2	Tuomo Tihinen	18.47 m	Johanna Pulkkinen	15.33 m
Discus Throw; August 2	Mikko Kyyrö	61.25 m	Tanja Komulainen	55.41 m
Hammer Throw; July 31 – August 1	Olli-Pekka Karjalainen	77.76 m	Merja Korpela	66.91 m
Javelin Throw; August 2 – August 1	Teemu Wirkkala	85.84 m	Mikaela Ingberg	57.87 m
Decathlon; August 1 – August 2	Tero Ojala	7649	—	—
Heptathlon; July 31 – August 1	—	—	Niina Kelo	5608

== See also ==
- Finland at the 2009 World Championships in Athletics
