= 2008 Finnish Athletics Championships =

The 2008 Finnish Athletics Championships were held in the Ratina Stadion in Tampere from July 24 to July 27, 2008. The event served as a qualification tournament for the 2008 Summer Olympics staged from August 15 to August 24, 2008 in Beijing, PR China.

== Results ==
(Finland) 2008 FINNISH ATHLETICS CHAMPIONSHIPS
| Track Events | Men’s Winners | | Women’s Winners | |
| Track Events | Name | Mark | Name | Mark |
|---|---|---|---|---|
| 100 metres | Joni Rautanen | 10,52 | Sari Keskitalo | 11,49 |
| 200 metres | Visa Hongisto | 20,88 | Sari Keskitalo | 23,59 |
| 400 metres | Matti Välimäki | 47,17 | Karin Storbacka | 54,55 |
| 800 metres | Mikko Lahtio | 1.48,77 | Mari Järvenpää | 2.07,82 |
| 1,500 metres | Robert Rotkirch | 3.53,95 | Mari Järvenpää | 4.26,68 |
| 5,000 metres | Jussi Utriainen | 14.10,35 | Annemari Sandell-Hyvärinen | 16.15,47 |
| 10,000 metres | Jussi Utriainen | 29.46,55 | Annemari Sandell-Hyvärinen | 34.53,18 |
| 110 m/100 m Hurdles | Markus Vilen | 14,12 | Johanna Halkoaho | 13,46 |
| 400 m Hurdles | Janne Mäkelä | 50,47 | Ilona Ranta | 58,06 |
| 3,000 m Steeplechase | Jukka Keskisalo | 8.33,21 | Sandra Eriksson | 10.15,25 |
| 20 km/10 km Race Walk | Jarkko Kinnunen | 1:25.56 | Marja Penttinen | 47.37 |
| Field Event | Men’s Winners | | Women’s Winners | |
| Field Event | Name | Mark | Name | Mark |
| High Jump | Oskari Frösén | 2.27 m | Hanna Grobler | 1.81 m |
| Pole Vault | Eemeli Salomäki | 5.35 m | Vanessa Vandy | 4.30 m |
| Long Jump | Petteri Lax | 8.11 m | Noora Pesola | 6.46 m |
| Triple Jump | Aleksi Tammentie | 15.93 m | Elina Sorsa | 13.40 m |
| Shot Put | Robert Häggblom | 18.88 m | Suvi Helin | 15.36 m |
| Discus Throw | Frantz Kruger | 61.59 m | Anita Hietalahti | 54.23 m |
| Hammer Throw | Olli-Pekka Karjalainen | 77.93 m | Merja Korpela | 67.43 m |
| Javelin Throw | Tero Järvenpää | 86.68 m | Kirsi Ahonen | 58.86 m |
| Decathlon | Jaakko Ojaniemi | 7517 | — | — |
| Heptathlon | — | — | Niina Kelo | 5757 |

== See also ==
- Finland at the 2008 Summer Olympics
