= Ivan Gertlein =

Russian pole vaulter (born 1987)

Personal information
- Born: 25 September 1987 (age 38)

Sport
- Country: Russia
- Sport: Track and field
- Event: Pole vault
- Updated on 29 August 2015

Ivan Aleksandrovich Gertlein (Russian: Иван Александрович Гертлейн; born 25 September 1987) is a Russian pole vaulter. He competed at the 2015 World Championships in Beijing advancing to the final where he no-heighted.

His personal bests in the event are 5.70 metres outdoors (Beijing 2015) and 5.50 metres indoors (Chelyabinsk 2011).

In October 2012 he tested positive for an anabolic steroid, testosterone, and received a two-year ban which lasted until October 2014.

== International competitions ==
Year	Competition	Venue	Position	Notes
2009	European U23 Championships	Kaunas, Lithuania	8th	5.15 m
2015	World Championships	Beijing, China	—	NM

== See also ==
- Russia at the 2015 World Championships in Athletics
- Doping cases in athletics
