= Karsten Dilla =

German pole vaulter

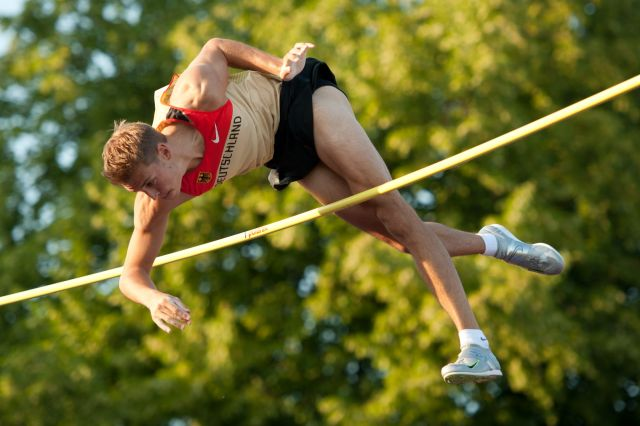
- Karsten Dilla in 2011

Personal information
- Born: 16 August 1989 (age 36) Düsseldorf, West Germany
- Height: 1.89 m (6 ft 2 in)
- Weight: 81 kg (179 lb)

Sport
- Sport: Athletics
- Event: Pole vault
- Club: TSV Bayer 04 Leverkusen
- Coached by: Leszek Klima; Jörn Elberding

Karsten Dilla (born 17 July 1989) is a German athlete specialising in the pole vault. He represented his country at the 2011 World Championships without qualifying for the final.

His personal bests in the event are 5.72 metres outdoors (Jockgrim 2011) and 5.73 metres indoors (Bad Oeynhausen 2012).

== Competition record ==
Year	Competition	Venue	Position	Notes
Representing Germany
2007	European Junior Championships	Hengelo, Netherlands	4th	5.35 m
2008	World Junior Championships	Bydgoszcz, Poland	3rd	5.30 m
2009	European U23 Championships	Kaunas, Lithuania	13th (q)	5.20 m
2011	European U23 Championships	Ostrava, Czech Republic	2nd	5.60 m
2011	World Championships	Daegu, South Korea	24th (q)	5.35 m
2014	European Championships	Zürich, Switzerland	9th (q)	5.40 m
2016	European Championships	Amsterdam, Netherlands	7th	5.30 m
2016	Olympic Games	Rio de Janeiro, Brazil	28th (q)	5.30 m
