= 2012 French Athletics Championships =

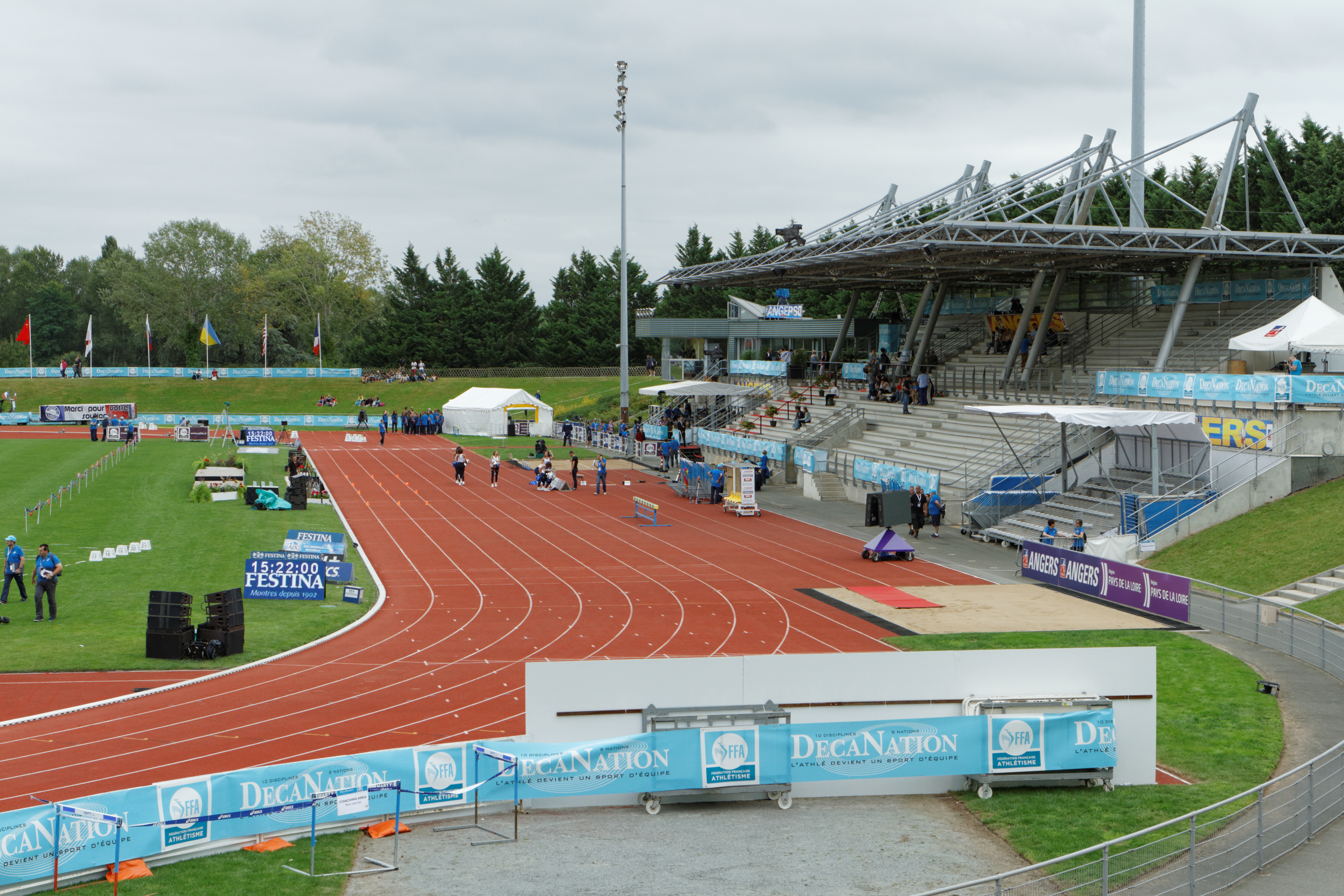
- The host stadium
- Dates: 15–17 June
- Host city: Angers
- Venue: Stade du Lac de Maine
- Events: 38

The 2012 French Athletics Championships was the 124th edition of the national championship in outdoor track and field for France. It was held on 15–17 June at the Stade du Lac de Maine in Angers. A total of 38 events (divided evenly between the sexes) were contested over the three-day competition.

== Results ==
=== Men ===
| Event | Gold | | Silver | | Bronze | |
|---|---|---|---|---|---|---|
| 100 metres | Christophe Lemaitre | 9.94 | Jimmy Vicaut | 10.05 | Emmanuel Biron | 10.10 |
| 200 metres | Christophe Lemaitre | 20.31 | Ben Bassaw | 20.58 | Jimmy Vicaut | 20.58 |
| 400 metres | Yannick Fonsat | 45.39 | Teddy Venel | 45.68 | Mame-Ibra Anne | 46.23 |
| 800 metres | Pierre-Ambroise Bosse | 1:48.52 | Hamid Oualich | 1:48.93 | Brice Leroy | 1:49.02 |
| 1500 metres | Florian Carvalho | 3:46.90 | Yoann Kowal | 3:47.07 | Simon Denissel | 3:47.09 |
| 5000 metres | Yohan Durand | 13:51.81 | Yassine Mandour | 13:56.76 | Hassan Hirt | 14:03.22 |
| 10,000 m walk | Yohann Diniz | 39:46.74 | Antonin Boyez | 40:56.23 | Sébastien Delaunay | 42:51.73 |
| 110 m hurdles | Garfield Darien | 13.28 | Samuel Coco-Viloin | 13.56 | Ladji Doucouré | 13.56 |
| 400 m hurdles | Héni Kechi | 49.91 | Adrien Clémenceau | 50.08 | Yoann Décimus | 50.09 |
| 3000 m s'chase | Mahiedine Mekhissi-Benabbad | 8:27.80 | Nordine Gezzar | 8:30.74 | Nouredine Smaïl | 8:32.82 |
| 4 × 100 m relay | AS Aix-Les-Bains; Manuel Reynaert; Christophe Lemaitre; Pierre-Alexis Pessonneaux; Ryan Aifa | 39.74 | Grand Angoulême Athlétisme | 40.24 | US Créteil | 40.51 |
| High jump | Mickaël Hanany | 2.25 m | Fabrice Saint-Jean | 2.22 m | Gary Lemony | 2.18 m |
| Pole vault | Renaud Lavillenie | 5.85 m | Romain Mesnil | 5.62 m | Alexandre Féger | 5.55 m |
| Long jump | Frédéric Erin | 8.01 m | Salim Sdiri | 7.98 m | Nicolas Gomont | 7.58 m |
| Triple jump | Harold Correa | 16.74 m | Karl Taillepierre | 16.69 m | Gaëtan Saku-Bafuanga | 16.54 m |
| Shot put | Tumatai Dauphin | 19.23 m | Yves Niaré | 18.87 m | Boris Vain | 18.01 m |
| Discus throw | Lolassonn Djouhan | 57.04 m | Jean-François Aurokiom | 56.98 m | Jean-Claude Retel | 55.87 m |
| Hammer throw | Nicolas Figère | 75.21 m | Quentin Bigot | 73.19 m | Jérôme Bortoluzzi | 72.73 m |
| Javelin throw | Killian Duréchou | 75.06 m | Jérôme Haeffler | 70.66 m | Julien Gourdier | 69.51 m |
| Decathlon | Florian Geffrouais | 8118 pts | Bastien Auzeil | 7709 pts | Jérémy Lelièvre | 7668 pts |

=== Women ===
| Event | Gold | | Silver | | Bronze | |
|---|---|---|---|---|---|---|
| 100 metres | Myriam Soumaré | 11.21 | Christine Arron | 11.34 | Ayodelé Ikuesan | 11.40 |
| 200 metres | Myriam Soumaré | 22.74 | Johanna Danois | 22.74 | Lina Jacques-Sébastien | 23.00 |
| 400 metres | Muriel Hurtis | 52.17 | Floria Gueï | 52.36 | Marie Gayot | 52.55 |
| 800 metres | Linda Marguet | 2:03.79 | Élodie Guégan | 2:04.61 | Clarisse Moh | 2:04.93 |
| 1500 metres | Hind Dehiba | 4:18.60 | Fanjanteino Félix | 4:18.99 | Alice Rocquain | 4:21.92 |
| 5000 metres | Christine Bardelle | 15:48.38 | Bouchra Ben Thami | 15:50.30 | Clémence Calvin | 15:57.85 |
| 10,000 m walk | Anne-Gaëlle Retout | 47:32.57 | Ines Pastorino | 47:40.18 | Violaine Averous | 48:04.88 |
| 100 m hurdles | Alice Decaux | 12.88 | Aisseta Diawara | 12.88 | Reina-Flor Okori | 12.97 |
| 400 m hurdles | Phara Anacharsis | 55.97 | Aurélie Chaboudez | 58.07 | Cécile Bernaleau | 59.13 |
| 3000 m s'chase | Claire Navez | 9:51.62 | Élodie Olivares | 9:54.69 | Meriem Mered | 10:16.76 |
| 4 × 100 m relay | AS Aix-Les-Bains | 45.88 | Amiens UC | 46.40 | Nice-Côte d'Azur athlétisme | 47.46 |
| High jump | Mélanie Melfort | 1.91 m | Dior Delophont | 1.85 m | Nina Manga | 1.82 m |
| Pole vault | Vanessa Boslak | 4.40 m | Marion Buisson | 4.35 m | Alice Ost | 4.30 m |
| Long jump | Éloyse Lesueur | 6.45 m | Darlène Mazeau | 6.05 m | Noémie Combette | 6.04 m |
| Triple jump | Françoise Mbango Etone | 14.27 m | Nathalie Marie-Nely | 13.97 m | Teresa Nzola Meso Ba | 13.79 m |
| Shot put | Jessica Cérival | 16.93 m | Myriam Lixfe | 16.13 m | Helena Perez | 15.11 m |
| Discus throw | Mélina Robert-Michon | 60.57 m | Pauline Pousse | 54.45 m | Irène Donzelot | 52.01 m |
| Hammer throw | Stéphanie Falzon | 70.57 m | Jessika Guehaseim | 69.66 m | Amy Sène | 69.10 m |
| Javelin throw | Mathilde Andraud | 56.34 m | Séphora Bissoly | 54.46 m | Prescilla Lecurieux | 53.04 m |
| Heptathlon | Yasmina Omrani | 5935 pts | Blandine Maisonnier | 5858 pts | Mélanie Cellier | 5404 pts |
