= Dimitrios Patsoukakis =

Greek pole vaulter

Personal information
- Born: 18 March 1987 (age 38)
- Height: 1.80 m (5 ft 11 in)
- Weight: 70 kg (154 lb)

Sport
- Sport: Athletics
- Event: Pole vault

Dimítrios Patsoukakis (Greek: Δημήτρης Πατσουκακης; born 18 March 1987) is a Greek athlete specialising in the pole vault. He won the bronze medal at the 2009 European U23 Championships.

His personal bests in the event are 5.62 metres outdoors (Athens 2014) and 5.60 metres indoors (Piraeus 2016).

== Competition record ==
Year	Competition	Venue	Position	Notes
Representing Greece
2006	World Junior Championships	Beijing, China	18th (q)	5.10 m
2009	European U23 Championships	Kaunas, Lithuania	3rd	5.55 m
2013	Mediterranean Games	Mersin, Turkey	4th	5.40 m
2014	European Championships	Zürich, Switzerland	16th (q)	5.30 m
2016	European Championships	Amsterdam, Netherlands	19th (q)	5.35 m
