= 2008 World Junior Championships in Athletics – Men's pole vault =

The men's pole vault event at the 2008 World Junior Championships in Athletics was held in Bydgoszcz, Poland, at Zawisza Stadium on 10 and 12 July.

== Medalists ==
Gold	Raphael Holzdeppe; Germany
Silver	Paweł Wojciechowski; Poland
Bronze	Karsten Dilla; Germany

== Results ==
=== Final ===
12 July

Rank	Name	Nationality	Result	Notes
1st place, gold medalist(s)	Raphael Holzdeppe	Germany	5.50	
2nd place, silver medalist(s)	Paweł Wojciechowski	Poland	5.40	
3rd place, bronze medalist(s)	Karsten Dilla	Germany	5.30	
4	Dezső Szabó	Hungary	5.30	
5	Andrew Marsh	United Kingdom	5.20	
6	Rasmus Wejnold Jørgensen	Denmark	5.20	
7	Hiroki Sasase	Japan	5.10	
7	Joe Berry	United States	5.10	
9	Anatoliy Bednyuk	Russia	5.10	
10	Maston Wallace	United States	5.00	
11	Cheyne Rahme	South Africa	5.00	
12	Yuya Ariake	Japan	4.85	
	Mickael Guillaume	France	NH	

=== Qualifications ===
10 July

==== Group A ====
Rank	Name	Nationality	Result	Notes
1	Anatoliy Bednyuk	Russia	5.15	q
2	Cheyne Rahme	South Africa	5.10	q
2	Maston Wallace	United States	5.10	q
4	Karsten Dilla	Germany	5.10	q
5	Dezső Szabó	Hungary	5.10	q
6	Hiroki Sasase	Japan	5.00	q
7	Noël Ost	France	5.00	
8	Scott Huggins	United Kingdom	4.90	
9	Sergey Tsybulka	Ukraine	4.90	
10	Manuel Concepción	Spain	4.70	
	Raphael Darquennes	Belgium	NH	

==== Group B ====
Rank	Name	Nationality	Result	Notes
1	Raphael Holzdeppe	Germany	5.20	Q
2	Joe Berry	United States	5.10	q
3	Rasmus Wejnold Jørgensen	Denmark	5.10	q
4	Yuya Ariake	Japan	5.10	q
4	Paweł Wojciechowski	Poland	5.10	q
6	Andrew Marsh	United Kingdom	5.10	q
7	Mickael Guillaume	France	5.00	q
8	Deryk Theodore	Canada	5.00	
9	Nikandros Stylianou	Cyprus	4.90	
10	Laurent Vanhees	Belgium	4.70	
11	Ivan Yeryomin	Ukraine	4.70	
12	Tomas Krajnák	Slovakia	4.70	

== Participation ==
According to an unofficial count, 23 athletes from 16 countries participated in the event.

- Belgium (2)
- Canada (1)
- Cyprus (1)
- Denmark (1)
- France (2)
- Germany (2)
- Hungary (1)
- Japan (2)
- Poland (1)
- Russia (1)
- Slovakia (1)
- South Africa (1)
- Spain (1)
- Ukraine (2)
- United Kingdom (2)
- United States (2)
