= Athletics at the 2011 Summer Universiade – Men's pole vault =

The men's pole vault event at the 2011 Summer Universiade was held on 18–20 August.

== Medalists ==
Gold	Silver	Bronze
Łukasz Michalski; Poland	Mateusz Didenkow; Poland; Aleksandr Gripich; Russia	

== Results ==
=== Qualification ===
Qualification: 5.30 m (Q) or at least 12 best (q) qualified for the final.

Rank	Group	Athlete	Nationality	4.80	4.90	5.00	5.10	5.20	5.30	Result	Notes
1	A	Mateusz Didenkow	Poland	–	–	–	–	–	o	5.30	Q
1	A	Aleksandr Gripich	Russia	–	–	–	–	o	o	5.30	Q
1	A	Jin Minsub	South Korea	–	–	o	–	o	o	5.30	Q
1	B	Albert Vélez	Spain	–	–	o	–	o	o	5.30	Q
5	A	Nikandros Stylianou	Cyprus	–	–	o	o	xo	o	5.30	Q, =PB
5	B	Panagiotis Laskaris	Greece	–	–	–	o	xo	o	5.30	Q
7	B	Viktor Kozlitin	Russia	–	–	–	–	–	xo	5.30	Q
7	B	Łukasz Michalski	Poland	–	–	–	–	–	xo	5.30	Q
7	B	Jason Wurster	Canada	–	–	–	–	o	xo	5.30	Q, SB
10	A	Andrej Poljanec	Slovenia	–	o	–	o	o	xxo	5.30	Q, SB
10	B	Hiroki Sasase	Japan	–	–	–	o	o	xxo	5.30	Q, SB
12	B	Pauls Pujāts	Latvia	xxo	–	o	xo	o	xxo	5.30	Q, =PB
13	A	Eemeli Salomäki	Finland	–	–	–	–	o	xxx	5.20	
14	A	Kārlis Pujāts	Latvia	–	–	xxo	o	xo	xxx	5.20	=PB
15	A	Yavgeniy Olhovsky	Israel	–	–	o	–	xxo	xxx	5.20	
16	B	Yao Jie	China	–	o	–	o	–	xxx	5.10	PB
17	A	Kreeta Sintawacheewa	Thailand	–	–	o	xxx			5.00	
17	B	Mohsen Rabbani	Iran	–	–	o	xx–	x		5.00	
19	A	Liu Tianlong	China	–	o	xxx				4.90	PB

=== Final ===
Rank	Athlete	Nationality	5.20	5.35	5.45	5.55	5.65	5.75	5.85	Result	Notes
1st place, gold medalist(s)	Łukasz Michalski	Poland	–	o	–	o	o	xxo	xxx	5.75	SB
2nd place, silver medalist(s)	Mateusz Didenkow	Poland	–	o	–	o	xo	xxo	xxx	5.75	PB
2nd place, silver medalist(s)	Aleksandr Gripich	Russia	–	o	o	o	xo	xxo	xxx	5.75	=PB
4	Viktor Kozlitin	Russia	–	xo	–	xxo	xxx			5.55	
5	Panagiotis Laskaris	Greece	o	o	xxx					5.35	
5	Nikandros Stylianou	Cyprus	o	o	xxx					5.35	PB
7	Jin Minsub	South Korea	xo	o	xxx					5.35	PB
8	Albert Vélez	Spain	o	xo	xxx					5.35	
9	Andrej Poljanec	Slovenia	o	xxx						5.20	
9	Jason Wurster	Canada	o	xxx						5.20	
11	Hiroki Sasase	Japan	xo	–	xxx					5.20	
	Pauls Pujāts	Latvia	xxx							NM	
