= Aleksandr Gripich =

Russian pole vaulter (born 1986)

Personal information
- Nationality: Russian
- Born: 29 September 1986 (age 39)

Sport
- Sport: Track and field
- Event: Pole vault

Achievements and titles
- Personal best(s): Outdoor: 5.75 m (2009); Indoor: 5.85 m (2015)
Medal record
Men's athletics
Representing Russia
European Indoor Championships
Silver medal – second place	2015 Prague	Pole vault
Summer Universiade
Gold medal – first place	2009 Belgrade	Pole vault
Silver medal – second place	2011 Shenzhen	Pole vault

Aleksandr Sergeevich Gripich (Russian: Александр Сергеевич Грипич; born 29 September 1986) is a Russian pole vaulter.

He finished fifth both at the 2009 World Championships and at the 2014 European Championships. He won silver medal at the 2015 European Indoor Championships. Gripich has also won gold medal at the 2009 Universiade and silver medal at the 2011 Universiade.

His personal best jump outdoor is 5.75 metres, achieved at the 2009 World Championships. His personal best jump indoor is 5.85 metres, achieved at the 2015 European Indoor Championships

== Competition record ==
Year	Competition	Venue	Position	Notes
Representing Russia
2003	European Youth Olympics	Paris, France	1st	4.95 m
2009	Universiade	Belgrade, Serbia	1st	5.60 m
2009	World Championships	Berlin, Germany	5th	5.75 m
2010	World Indoor Championships	Doha, Qatar	13th (q)	5.45 m
2010	European Championships	Barcelona, Spain	–	NM
2011	Universiade	Shenzhen, China	2nd	5.75 m
2013	Universiade	Kazan, Russia	5th	5.40 m
2013	World Championships	Moscow, Russia	24th (q)	5.40 m
2014	European Championships	Zürich, Switzerland	5th	5.65 m
2015	European Indoor Championships	Prague, Czech Republic	2nd	5.85 m
2015	World Championships	Beijing, China	17th (q)	5.65 m
