= Stade du Lac de Maine =

Multi-purpose Stadium

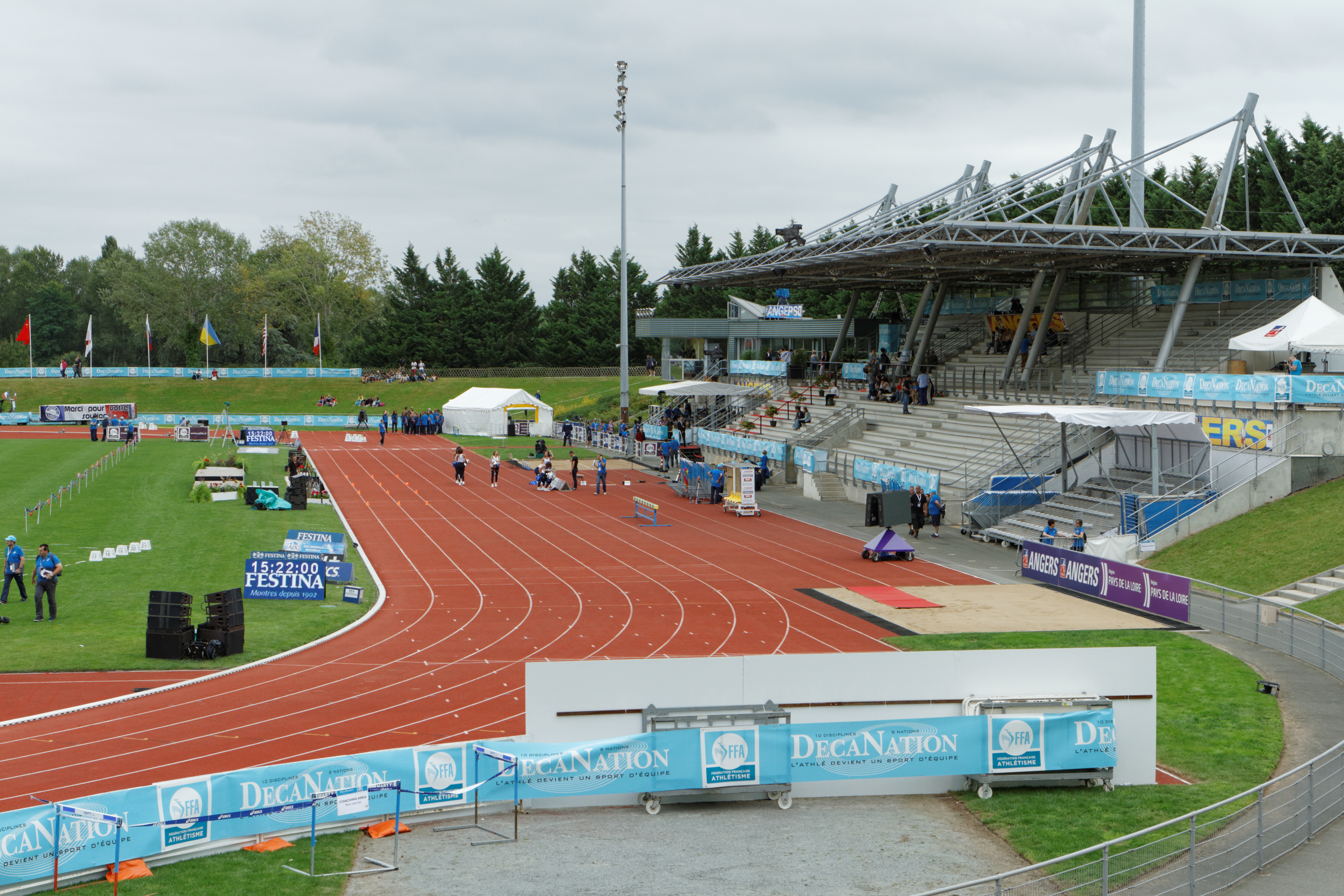
- The stadium interior in 2014

- Location within France
- Address: Rue Jules Ladoumègue; 49000 Angers
- Coordinates: 47.469°N 0.583°W
- Capacity: 5,000 places

Tenants
- AS Lac de Maine (DRH); Angers Athletic Club; ASPTT Angers Athlétisme; Club Sportif Jean Bouin; Entente Nord Anjou Angers; Intrepide Angers Athlétisme; SCO Athlétisme; ASLM Football; SCO Hockey; Vaillante Hockey; ASPTT Angers Triathlon; Angers Triathlon

The Stade du Lac de Maine (French pronunciation: [stad dy lak də mɛn]) is a multi-purpose stadium located in Angers, France.

The stadium includes a number of facilities: it has four football fields, a synthetic hockey field, a grass rugby field, an 400m athletic track with 8 lanes, and a jump runway (for track) with two landing pits.

== Notable events ==
The Stade du Lac de Maine has hosted the French Athletics Championships in 2005, 2009, 2012, and 2016. In 2014, the stadium hosted DécaNation, an annual track and field competition.
