= Luke Cutts =

British pole vaulter (born 1988)

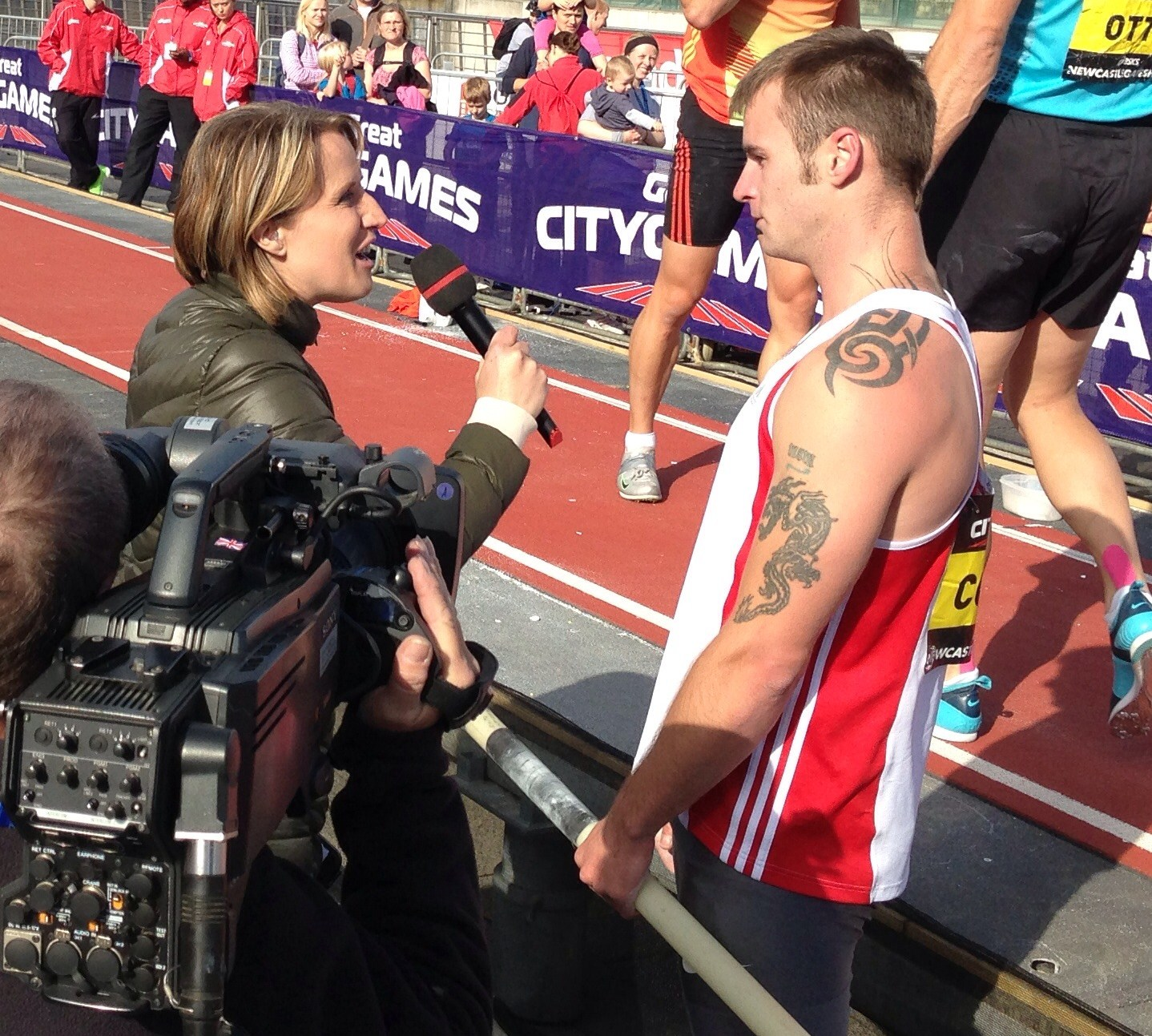
- Cutts (right) being interviewed by Katherine Merry at the 2013 Great North City Games

Personal information
- Nationality: British (English)
- Born: 13 February 1988 (age 38) Sheffield, England
- Height: 1.88 m (6 ft 2 in)
- Weight: 82 kg (181 lb)

Sport
- Sport: Athletics
- Event: Pole Vault
- Club: City of Sheffield and Dearne AC

Achievements and titles
- Personal best: 5.83m (Rouen 2014)
Medal record
Representing England
Commonwealth Games
Silver medal – second place	2014 Glasgow	Pole vault
Bronze medal – third place	2018 Gold Coast	Pole vault

Luke Arron Cutts (born 13 February 1988) is a British pole vaulter, who represented Great Britain at the 2016 Summer Olympics.

His personal best of 5.83 m (19 ft 1 1/2 in) set in 2014 is the British indoor record for the event. His outdoor best of 5.70 m (18 ft 8 1/4 in) puts him third on the all-time British lists. He represented Great Britain at the World Junior Championships in Athletics in 2006, the European Athletics Junior Championships in 2007, then won a silver medal at the 2009 European Athletics U23 Championships. At his first three senior international championships (2009 World Championships in Athletics, 2010 Commonwealth Games and 2012 European Athletics Championships) he failed to progress beyond the qualifying round. He quit work as an overnight labourer in a lorry depot to focus on pole vault full-time at the start of 2013 which brought an upturn in performances. He won the 2013 British Championship but was passed over for World Championship selection in favour of compatriot Steve Lewis. After a strong beginning to his indoor season in 2014 Cutts came back from a mid season neck injury to win a silver medal at the 2014 Commonwealth Games.

== Career ==
=== Early career ===
He was born in Sheffield; he began pole vaulting around 1999. In 2004 he was a junior champion in weightlifting. In pole vault he cleared four metres that year and improved to 4.90 m (16 ft 3/4 in) in 2005. He was won the AAA junior titles indoors and outdoors in 2006 and set a best of 5.30 m (17 ft 4 1/2 in) in competition at the 2006 World Junior Championships in Athletics, where he ranked ninth overall.

An indoor clearance of 5.40 m (17 ft 8 1/2 in) brought Cutts the British junior record for the event in February 2007. He was runner-up at the British Indoor Championships and the British Outdoor Championships that year, but in his sole international outing he failed to record a valid mark at the 2007 European Athletics Junior Championships. A third-place finish at the British Olympic trials meant he did not attend the 2008 Summer Olympics, but he continued to improve, setting a mark of 5.50 m (18 ft 1/2 in) at the end of the year. Cutts' training based at the Dearneside Leisure Centre with his coach Trevor Fox combined a variety of methods including: improving upper-body strength, speedwork, gymnastics and vaulting technique. Emphasising all-round athletic skills, his performances progressively improved.

=== 2009–2013, British titles ===
Cutts made his breakthrough as a senior athlete in 2009. A vault of 5.62 m (18 ft 5 1/4 in) to win the Northern England senior title was a new personal best and in the outdoor season he matched his best of 5.55 m (18 ft 2 1/2 in) to win his first national title at the British Athletics Championships. He was the silver medallist at the 2009 European Athletics U23 Championships with a new best of 5.60 m (18 ft 4 1/4 in) behind the favourite Raphael Holzdeppe. He was fourth at the London Grand Prix but faltered at the 2009 World Championships in Athletics, as he vaulted only 5.40 m (17 ft 8 1/2 in) and was eliminated in qualifying. His 2010 season also saw him perform poorly for Great Britain: after finishing third at the British indoor and outdoor championships he did not record a valid height at the Commonwealth Games. He came near his best again at the 2011 Birmingham Indoor Grand Prix, finishing second with 5.60 m (18 ft 4 1/4 in), but his progression halted again as he no-heighted at the British trials.

Despite the attraction of qualifying for the 2012 London Olympics, Cutts did not recapture his best form in the 2012 season either. He was out of the podium places at the national championships and his mark of 5.10 m (16 ft 8 3/4 in) was the lowest recorded in the field at the 2012 European Athletics Championships. It was in 2013 that Cutts returned to his best form.

Cutts quit his work doing 10-hour night shifts loading lorries at a depot at the beginning of 2013 to allow himself to focus full-time on pole vaulting. He added a centimetre to his personal best in Sheffield in July 2013 then won the second British outdoor title of his career in a new best of 5.65 m (18 ft 6 1/4 in). More came at the London Grand Prix/Anniversary Games, where he defeated national rival Steven Lewis and came fourth with another best of 5.70 m (18 ft 8 1/4 in). Despite this, UK Athletics selected Lewis for the 2013 World Championships in Athletics instead. This decision attracted much criticism after Lewis finished last at the World Championships, failing to clear the bar.

=== 2014–present, British record ===
Cutts established himself as the top British vaulter at the start of 2014. Following on from a 5.71 m (18 ft 8 3/4 in) personal best in December, he broke Nick Buckfield's 12-year-old British indoor record on his first attempt at a height of 5.83 m (19 ft 1 1/2 in). He took his first British indoor title shortly afterwards, beating Max Eaves. At the Pole Vault Stars meeting his cleared 5.81 m (19 ft 1/2 in), the second best performance of his career, but his runner-up placing was overshadowed by the winner, Renaud Lavillenie, who broke Sergey Bubka's long-standing world record with a mark of 6.15 m (20 ft 2 in). Cutts entered the 2014 IAAF World Indoor Championships as the second ranked athlete (Lavillenie was injured while Malte Mohr had cleared 5.90 m (19 ft 4 1/4 in). However having suffered a neck injury Cutts couldn't reproduce his strong form from earlier in the year and finished 8th. His neck injury hindered Cutts' preparation for the outdoor season but he still managed to produce a jump of 5.55m at the Commonwealth Games to take a silver medal behind his domestic rival Steve Lewis. At the 2016 Olympics, Cutts managed 5.45m to finish 12th in his qualifying pool.
