= Raphael Holzdeppe =

German pole vaulter

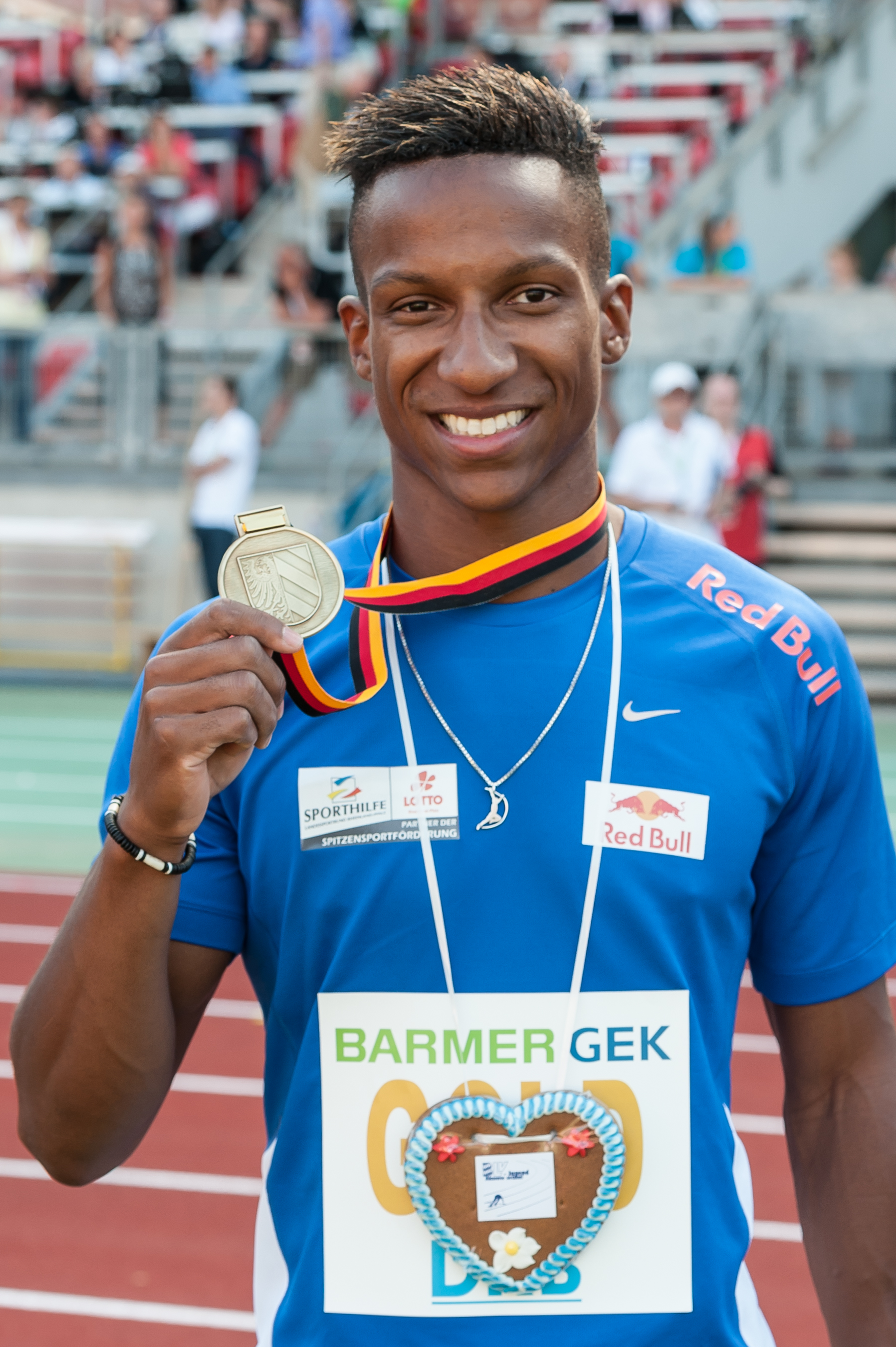
- Holzdeppe in 2015

Personal information
- Full name: Raphael Marcel Holzdeppe
- Nationality: German
- Born: 28 September 1989 (age 37) Kaiserslautern, West Germany
- Height: 1.81 m (5 ft 11 1/2 in)
- Weight: 80 kg (176 lb)

Sport
- Sport: Track and field
- Event: Pole vault
- Club: LAZ Zweibrücken
- Coached by: Andrei Tivontchik
Medal record
Olympic Games
Bronze medal – third place	2012 London	Pole vault
World Championships
Gold medal – first place	2013 Moscow	Pole vault
Silver medal – second place	2015 Beijing	Pole vault
European Championships
Bronze medal – third place	2012 Helsinki	Pole vault
European U23 Championships
Gold medal – first place	2009 Kaunas	Pole vault
World Junior Championships
Gold medal – first place	2008 Bydgoszcz	Pole vault

Raphael Marcel Holzdeppe (born 28 September 1989) is a German pole vaulter, who was world champion at his event. He lives in Zweibrücken in Germany and represents the sports club LAZ Zweibrücken.

== Biography ==
Holzdeppe, who is of African origin, was adopted by a German couple shortly after his birth. He was raised in Kaiserslautern in Germany.

Holzdeppe finished fifth at the 2006 World Junior Championships and won the 2008 World Junior Championships. At the 2007 European Junior Championships, he notably got no result, having no-heighted in the qualifying round. He received the bronze medal at the 2012 Summer Olympics in London, behind countryman Björn Otto and Frenchman Renaud Lavillenie.

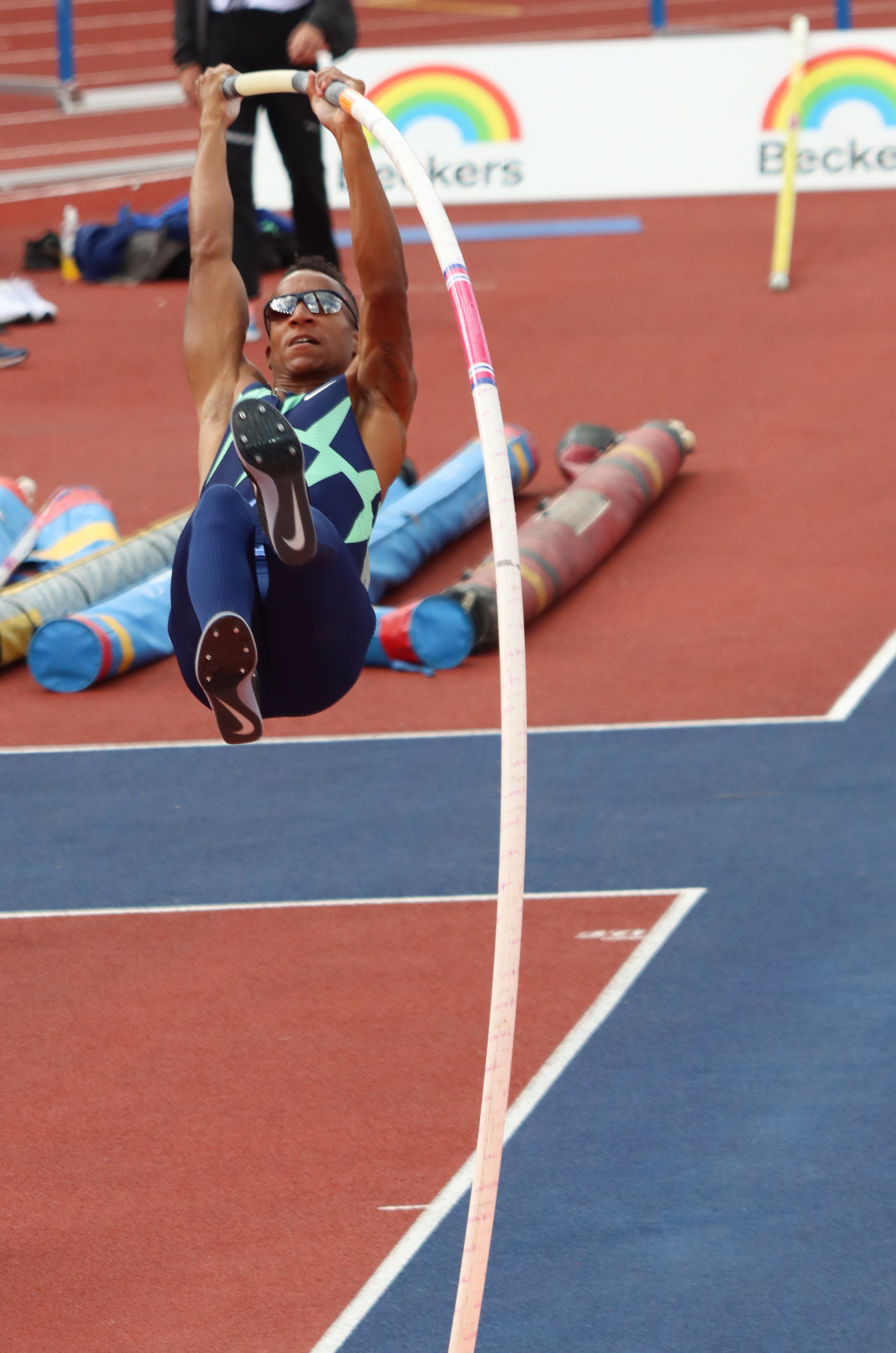
Raphael Holzdeppe at the 2020 Bauhaus Galan meeting in Stockholm

His personal best jump is 5.94 metres, achieved on 26 July 2015 set in Nuremberg. A previous personal best was 5.80 metres, achieved in June 2008, setting the world junior record. He holds the world junior indoor record with 5.68 metres, achieved in March 2008 in Halle, Saxony-Anhalt. As a result of this feat, he won the 2008 European Athletics Rising Star of the Year Award. Meanwhile, he finished his Abitur in the lyceum of Helmholtz in Zweibrücken.

Holzdeppe won his first senior world title at the 2013 World Championships in Athletics in Moscow with a jump of 5.89 m.

== Competition record ==
Year	Competition	Venue	Position	Notes
Representing Germany
2005	World Youth Championships	Marrakesh, Morocco	–	NM
2006	World Junior Championships	Beijing, China	5th	5.30 m
2007	European Junior Championships	Hengelo, Netherlands	–	NM
2008	World Junior Championships	Bydgoszcz, Poland	1st	5.50 m
2008	Olympic Games	Beijing, China	7th	5.60 m
2009	European U23 Championships	Kaunas, Lithuania	1st	5.65 m
2010	European Championships	Barcelona, Spain	9th	5.60 m
2011	European U23 Championships	Ostrava, Czech Republic	6th	5.50 m
2011	World Championships	Daegu, South Korea	20th (q)	5.50 m
2012	European Championships	Helsinki, Finland	3rd	5.77 m
2012	Olympic Games	London, United Kingdom	3rd	5.91 m
2013	European Indoor Championships	Gothenburg, Sweden	8th	5.61 m
2013	World Championships	Moscow, Russia	1st	5.89 m
2015	World Championships	Beijing, China	2nd	5.90 m
2016	Olympic Games	Rio de Janeiro, Brazil	26th (q)	5.45 m
2017	European Indoor Championships	Belgrade, Serbia	5th	5.80 m
2017	World Championships	London, United Kingdom	5th (q)	5.70 m^{1}
2018	World Indoor Championships	Birmingham, United Kingdom	5th	5.80 m
2018	European Championships	Berlin, Germany	–	NM
2019	World Championships	Doha, Qatar	6th	5.70 m

^{1}No mark in the final

== See also ==
- Germany all-time top lists – Pole vault
