= Naoki Kobayashi (sprinter) =

Japanese sprinter

Personal information
- Nationality: Japanese
- Born: 20 December 1990 (age 35) Hadano, Kanagawa, Japan
- Education: Tokai University
- Height: 1.70 m (5 ft 7 in)
- Weight: 65 kg (143 lb)

Sport
- Country: Japan
- Sport: Track and field
- Event: 400 metres
- Club: HULFT

Achievements and titles
- Personal best(s): 200 m: 20.97 (2014) 300 m: 33.29 (2014) 400 m: 45.79 (2014)
Medal record
Men's athletics
Representing Japan
East Asian Games
| Silver medal – second place | 2013 Tianjin | 4×400 m relay |
| Bronze medal – third place | 2013 Tianjin | 400 m |

Naoki Kobayashi (小林 直己, Kobayashi Naoki; born 20 December 1990 in Hadano, Kanagawa) is a Japanese track and field sprinter who specialises in the 400 metres. His personal best in the event is 45.79 seconds. He competed in the 4 × 400 metres relay at the 2015 World Championships without qualifying for the final.

== Personal bests ==
| Event | Time (s) | Competition | Venue | Date |
|---|---|---|---|---|
| 200 m | 20.97 (wind: 0.0 m/s) | Kanto University Championships | Yokohama, Japan | 24 May 2014 |
| 300 m | 33.29 | Izumo Meet | Izumo, Japan | 20 April 2014 |
| 400 m | 45.79 | Japan–China–Korea Friendship Meet | Jinhua, China | 6 July 2014 |

== International competition ==
| Year | Competition | Venue | Position | Event | Time |
Representing Japan
| 2013 | East Asian Games | Tianjin, China | 3rd | 400 m | 46.76 |
| 2013 | East Asian Games | Tianjin, China | 2nd | 4×400 m relay | 3:07.32 (relay leg: 2nd) |
| 2015 | World Relays | Nassau, Bahamas | 17th (h) | 4×400 m relay | 3:06.38 (relay leg: 1st) SB |
| 2015 | World Championships | Beijing, China | 15th (h) | 4×400 m relay | 3:02.97 (relay leg: 3rd) SB |
| 2017 | World Relays | Nassau, Bahamas | — (h) | 4×400 m relay | DNF (relay leg: 3rd) |

== National titles ==
| Year | Competition | Venue | Event | Time (s) |
Representing Tokai University and Kanagawa (National Sports Festival only)
| 2014 | National University Individual Championships | Hiratsuka, kanagawa | 400 m | 47.11 |
| 2015 | National Sports Festival | Wakayama, Wakayama | 400 m | 46.87 |
