= Kosuke Horii =

Japanese sprinter (born 1994)

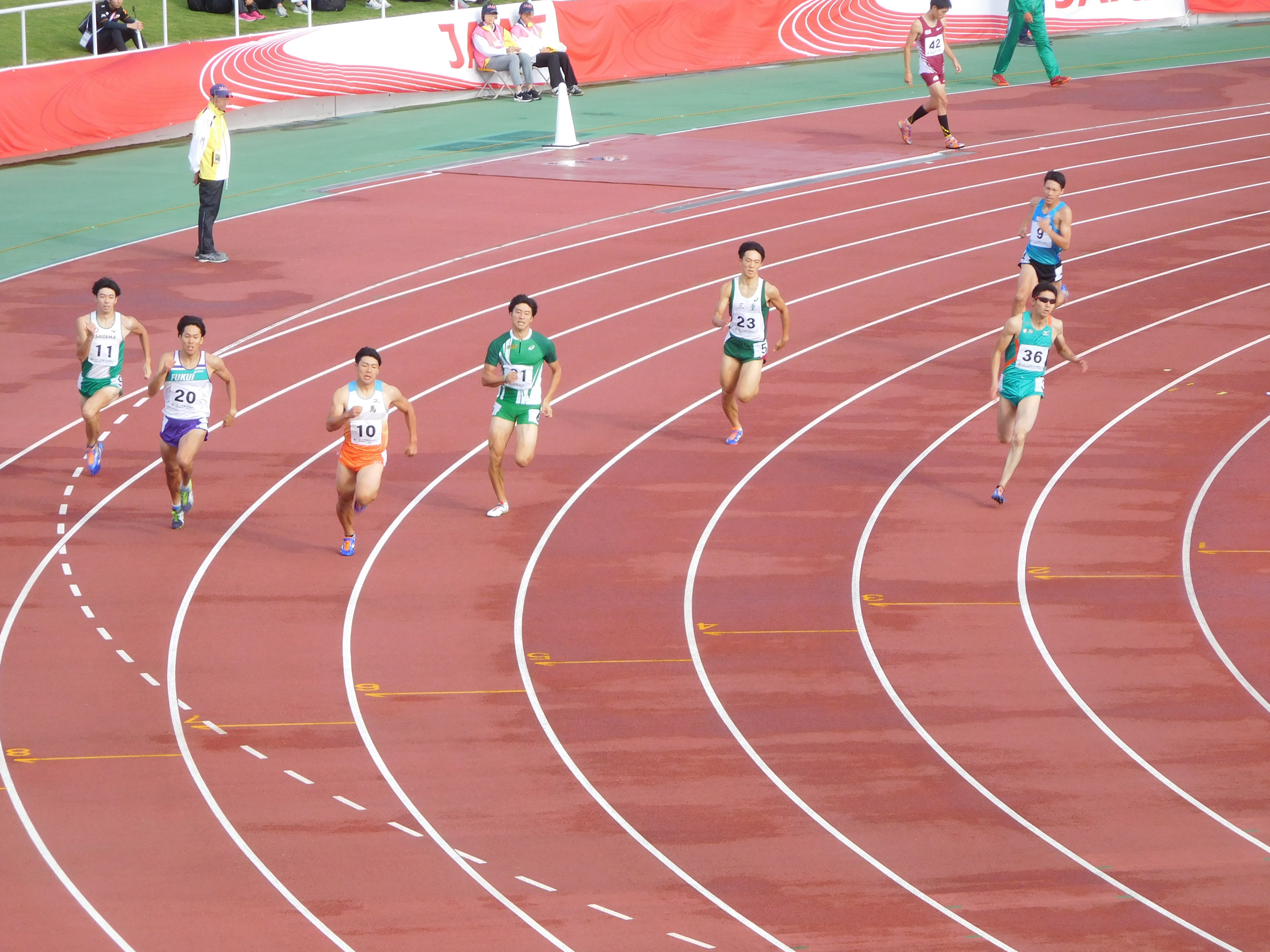
- Horii (No.11) at the 2019 National Sports Festival

Personal information
- Nationality: Japanese
- Born: 27 April 1994 (age 32) Saitama Prefecture, Japan
- Education: Josai University
- Height: 1.73 m (5 ft 8 in)
- Weight: 65 kg (143 lb)

Sport
- Country: Japan
- Sport: Track and field
- Event: 400 metres
- Club: Sumitomo Electric

Achievements and titles
- Personal best(s): 200 m: 21.46 (2018) 300 m: 33.43 (2019) 400 m: 45.85 (2015)

Kosuke Horii (堀井 浩介, Horii Kōsuke; born 27 April 1994 in Saitama Prefecture) is a Japanese track and field sprinter who specialises in the 400 metres. His personal best in the event is 45.85 seconds. He competed in the 4 × 400 metres relay at the 2017 World Championships.

== Personal bests ==
Event	Time (s)	Competition	Venue	Date
200 m	21.46 (wind: +0.7 m/s)	Kansai Corporate Championships	Osaka, Japan	12 May 2018
300 m	33.43	Izumo Meet	Izumo, Japan	21 April 2019
400 m	45.85	National Championships	Niigata, Japan	27 June 2015

== International competition ==
Year	Competition	Venue	Position	Event	Time
Representing Japan
2017	World Relays	Nassau, Bahamas	— (h)	4×400 m relay	DNF (relay leg: 4th)
2017	World Championships	London, United Kingdom	15th (h)	4×400 m relay	3:07.29 (relay leg: 4th)

== National titles ==
Year	Competition	Venue	Event	Time
Representing Sumitomo Electric
2018	National Corporate Championships	Osaka, Osaka	4×400 m relay	3:08.79 (relay leg: 3rd)
2018	National Championships	Kitakyushu, Fukuoka	4×400 m relay	3:09.35 (relay leg: 1st)
