= Tomoya Tamura =

Japanese sprinter

Personal information
- Born: 20 August 1992 (age 33) Toyoake, Japan
- Education: Chukyo University
- Height: 1.78 m (5 ft 10 in)
- Weight: 68 kg (150 lb)

Sport
- Country: Japan
- Sport: Athletics
- Event: 400 m
- Club: Sumitomo Electric Athletics Club

Achievements and titles
- Personal bests: 100 m: 10.49 (Kyoto 2018) 200 m: 20.67 (Osaka 2019) 400 m: 45.84 (Osaka 2017)

Tomoya Tamura (田村 朋也, Tamura Tomoya; born 20 August 1992) is a Japanese sprinter. He competed in the men's 4 × 400 metres relay at the 2016 Summer Olympics.

== Personal bests ==
Event	Time (s)	Wind (m/s)	Competition	Venue	Date	Notes
100 m	10.49	+0.4	Kinki Championships	Kyoto, Japan	1 September 2018	
200 m	20.67	-1.2	Kinki Championships	Osaka, Japan	8 September 2019	
400 m	45.84	n/a	Japanese Championships	Osaka, Japan	23 June 2017	

== National Record Holder ==
Event	Time	Member	Competition	Venue	Date	Notes
Mixed 4×400 m relay	3:18.77	Seika Aoyama; Kota Wakabayashi; Tomoya Tamura; Saki Takashima	World Championships	Doha, Qatar	28 September 2019	Current NR

== International competition ==
Year	Competition	Venue	Position	Event	Time	Notes
Representing Japan and Asia-Pacific (Continental Cup only)
2014	Continental Cup	Marrakech, Morocco	4th	4×400 m relay	3:03.77 (relay leg: 1st)	
2015	World Championships	Beijing, China	15th (h)	4×400 m relay	3:02.97 (relay leg: 1st)	SB
2015	DécaNation	Paris, France	4th	400 m	46.65	
2016	Olympic Games	Rio de Janeiro, Brazil	13th (h)	4×400 m relay	3:02.95 (relay leg: 2nd)	
2017	World Relays	Nassau, Bahamas	— (h)	4×400 m relay	DNF (relay leg: 2nd)	
2019	World Relays	Yokohama, Japan	5th	4×200 m relay	1:22.67 (relay leg: 3rd)	SB
2019	World Championships	Doha, Qatar	16th (h)	Mixed 4×400 m relay	3:18.77 (relay leg: 3rd)	NR
