= Pavel Prokopenko =

Russian pole vaulter (born 1987)

Pavel Prokopenko (Russian: Павел Прокопенко; born 24 September 1987 in Moscow) is a Russian pole vaulter.

He finished fifth at the 2006 World Junior Championships. He also competed at the 2007 World Championships, but no-heighted and did not reach the final.

His personal best jump is 5.75 metres, achieved in July 2007 in Debrecen.
