= Guo Zhongze =

Chinese sprinter (born 1996)

Personal information
- Born: 7 August 1996 (age 29)

Sport
- Country: China
- Sport: Track and field
- Event: 400 metres

Achievements and titles
- Personal bests: 200 m: 20.68 (Hangzhou 2017); 400 m: 45.14 NR (Tianjin 2017)
- Updated on 29 August 2015

Guo Zhongze (born 7 August 1996 in Fushun, Liaoning) is a Chinese sprinter specialising in the 400 metres. He competed at the 2015 World Championships in Beijing without advancing from the first round. Guo holds the Chinese national record for the 400 metres. His personal bests in the event are 45.14 seconds outdoors (Tianjin 2017) and 47.95 seconds indoors (Doha 2016).

Guo received a one-year ban for an anti-doping rule violation after failing to submit to a doping control in November 2018.

== International competitions ==
Year	Competition	Venue	Position	Event	Notes
Representing China
2015	World Championships	Beijing, China	42nd (h)	400 m	46.42
2016	Asian Indoor Championships	Doha, Qatar	5th	400 m	47.95
