= Shota Hara =

Japanese sprinter (born 1992)

Personal information
- Nationality: Japanese
- Born: 18 July 1992 (age 34) Ina, Nagano, Japan
- Education: Jobu University
- Height: 1.80 m (5 ft 11 in)
- Weight: 74 kg (163 lb)

Sport
- Country: Japan
- Sport: Track and field
- Events: 100 metres 200 metres
- Club: Suzuki Athlete Club

Achievements and titles
- Personal bests: 100 m: 10.13 (2017); 200 m: 20.33 (2016)
Medal record
Men's athletics
Representing Japan
Asian Games
Silver medal – second place	2014 Incheon	4×100 m relay

Shota Hara (原 翔太, Hara Shōta; born 18 July 1992 in Ina, Nagano) is a Japanese track and field sprinter who specialises in the 200 metres. He is the 2014 National champion in the event and has a personal best of 20.33 seconds. He has also 10.13 seconds in the 100 metres. He competed at the 2014 Asian Games and the 2015 Asian Championships.

== Personal bests ==
Event	Time (s)	Competition	Venue	Date
100 m	10.13 (wind: +1.9 m/s)	Fuse Sprint	Tottori, Japan	4 June 2017
200 m	20.33 (wind: +1.8 m/s)	National Championships	Nagoya, Japan	26 June 2016

== International competitions ==
Year	Competition	Venue	Position	Event	Time (s)
Representing Japan
2014	Asian Games	Incheon, South Korea	5th	200 m	20.89 (wind: +0.3 m/s)
2014	Asian Games	Incheon, South Korea	3rd (h) (Note: Did not compete in the final where Japan won the silver medal)	4×100 m relay	39.18 (relay leg: 4th)
2015	Asian Championships	Wuhan, China	7th	200 m	21.16 (wind: +1.0 m/s)
2016	DécaNation	Angers, France	2nd	200 m	20.63 (wind: -0.4 m/s)
2017	DécaNation	Angers, France	2nd	200 m	20.65 (wind: +0.4 m/s)

== National title ==
Year	Competition	Venue	Event	Time (s)
Representing Jobu University
2014	National Championships	Fukushima, Fukushima	200 m	20.62 (wind: +0.9 m/s)
