= Hiroki Sasase =

Japanese pole vaulter (born 1989)

Personal information
- Nationality: Japanese
- Born: 17 August 1989 (age 36) Shizuoka Prefecture, Japan
- Education: Waseda University
- Height: 1.73 m (5 ft 8 in)
- Weight: 63 kg (139 lb)

Sport
- Country: Japan
- Sport: Track and field
- Event: Pole vault

Achievements and titles
- Personal best: 5.51 m (Fukuroi 2015)
Medal record
Men's athletics
Representing Japan
East Asian Games
Silver medal – second place	2009 Hong Kong	Pole vault

Hiroki Sasase (笹瀬 弘樹, Sasase Hiroki; born 17 August 1989) is a Japanese pole vaulter. He finished eighth at the 2005 World Youth Championships, seventh at the 2008 World Junior Championships and won the silver medal at the 2009 East Asian Games. He is the former national junior high school record holder (4.92 metres) and former national high school record holder (5.41 metres).

== Personal bests ==
Event	Height	Competition	Venue	Date
Outdoor	5.51 m	Shizuoka Championships	Shizuoka, Japan	12 July 2015

== International competition ==
Year	Competition	Venue	Position	Event	Height
Representing Japan
2005	World Youth Championships	Marrakesh, Morocco	8th	Pole vault	4.85 m
2008	World Junior Championships	Bydgoszcz, Poland	7th	Pole vault	5.10 m
2009	East Asian Games	Hong Kong, China	2nd	Pole vault	5.30 m
2011	Universiade	Shenzhen, China	11th	Pole vault	5.20 m
