= Gimcheon Stadium =

Sports venue in Gimcheon, South Korea

Coordinates: 36°8′22.71″N 128°5′11.43″E

The Gimcheon Stadium is a multi-purpose stadium in Gimcheon, South Korea. It is currently used mostly for football matches and is the home stadium of the K League 1 team Gimcheon Sangmu FC. The stadium has a seating capacity for 25,000 spectators.

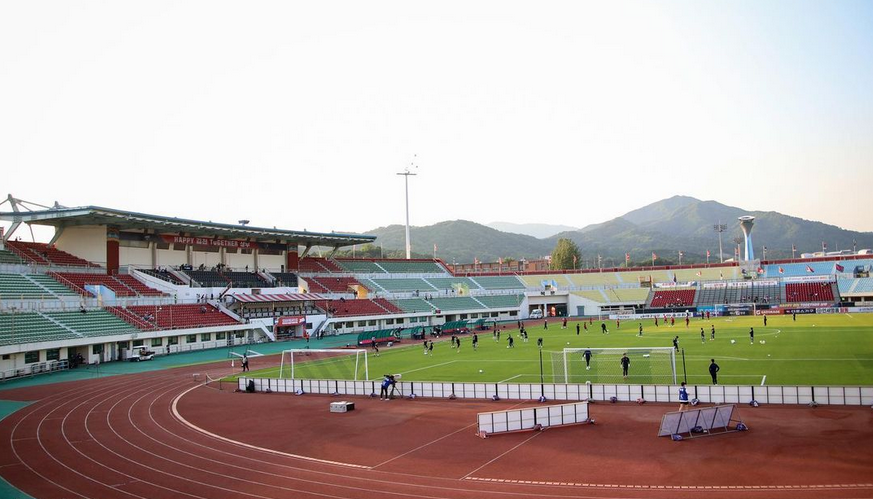
Gimcheon Stadium
