= 2011 Meeting Areva =

- Dates: 8 July 2011
- Host city: Saint-Denis, France
- Venue: Stade de France
- Level: 2011 Diamond League

The 2011 Meeting Areva was the 27th edition of the annual outdoor track and field meeting in Saint-Denis, France. Held on 8 July at Stade de France, it was the eighth leg of the 2011 Diamond League – the highest level international track and field circuit.

== Diamond events results ==
Podium finishers earned points towards a season leaderboard (4-2-1 respectively), points per event were then doubled in the Diamond League Finals. Athletes had to take part in the Diamond race during the finals to be eligible to win the Diamond trophy which is awarded to the athlete with the most points at the end of the season.

=== Men's ===
200 Metres
Rank	Athlete	Nation	Time	Points	Notes
1st place, gold medalist(s)	Usain Bolt	Jamaica	20.03	4	
2nd place, silver medalist(s)	Christophe Lemaitre	France	20.21	2	
3rd place, bronze medalist(s)	Darvis Patton	United States	20.59	1	
4	Mario Forsythe	Jamaica	20.61		
5	Rondel Sorrillo	Trinidad and Tobago	20.81		
6	Teddy Tinmar	France	21.15		
7	Shawn Crawford	United States	22.17		
			Wind: (−0.6 m/s)		

400 Metres
Rank	Athlete	Nation	Time	Points	Notes
1st place, gold medalist(s)	Chris Brown	Bahamas	44.94	4	SB
2nd place, silver medalist(s)	Jonathan Borlée	Belgium	45.05	2	
3rd place, bronze medalist(s)	Jermaine Gonzales	Jamaica	45.43	1	
4	Jeremy Wariner	United States	45.50		
5	Oscar Pistorius	South Africa	45.84		
6	Michael Bingham	Great Britain	45.84		
7	Calvin Smith Jr.	United States	45.88		
8	Yoann Décimus	France	46.88		

1500 Metres
Rank	Athlete	Nation	Time	Points	Notes
1st place, gold medalist(s)	Amine Laâlou	Morocco	3:32.15	4	
2nd place, silver medalist(s)	Asbel Kiprop	Kenya	3:33.04	2	
3rd place, bronze medalist(s)	Bernard Lagat	United States	3:33.11	1	SB
4	Nick Willis	New Zealand	3:33.22		SB
5	Mohamed Moustaoui	Morocco	3:33.59		SB
6	Leonel Manzano	United States	3:33.66		SB
7	Yoann Kowal	France	3:33.75		PB
8	Deresse Mekonnen	Ethiopia	3:33.84		
9	Andrew Wheating	United States	3:34.39		SB
10	Manuel Olmedo	Spain	3:34.44		PB
11	Matthew Centrowitz Jr.	United States	3:34.69		PB
12	Mekonnen Gebremedhin	Ethiopia	3:34.86		
13	Florian Carvalho	France	3:35.29		PB
14	Carsten Schlangen	Germany	3:35.74		SB
15	Andy Baddeley	Great Britain	3:36.47		SB
16	Abdalaati Iguider	Morocco	3:37.94		
—	Hillary Maiyo	Kenya	DNF		PM
—	Jeremy Jolivet	France	DNF		PM
—	~~Mohammed Shaween~~	~~Saudi Arabia~~	~~DNF~~		DQ (Note: Due to doping violations Shaween's results during this competition were disqualified.)

110 Metres hurdles
Rank	Athlete	Nation	Time	Points	Notes
1st place, gold medalist(s)	Dayron Robles	Cuba	13.09	4	
2nd place, silver medalist(s)	David Oliver	United States	13.09	2	
3rd place, bronze medalist(s)	Dwight Thomas	Jamaica	13.18	1	
4	Aries Merritt	United States	13.27		
5	Jason Richardson	United States	13.31		
6	Andy Turner	Great Britain	13.43		
7	Terrence Trammell	United States	13.57		
—	Dimitri Bascou	France	DQ		R 162.7
			Wind: (+1.3 m/s)		

3000 Metres steeplechase
Rank	Athlete	Nation	Time	Points	Notes
1st place, gold medalist(s)	Mahiedine Mekhissi-Benabbad	France	8:02.09	4	PB
2nd place, silver medalist(s)	Ezekiel Kemboi	Kenya	8:07.14	2	SB
3rd place, bronze medalist(s)	Benjamin Kiplagat	Uganda	8:08.43	1	SB
4	Roba Gari	Ethiopia	8:10.03		SB
5	Jairus Birech	Kenya	8:11.31		PB
6	Tarık Langat Akdağ	Kenya	8:13.14		
7	Ruben Ramolefi	South Africa	8:14.36		
8	Łukasz Parszczyński	Poland	8:15.47		PB
9	Nordine Gezzar	France	8:16.03		PB
10	Elijah Kipterege	Kenya	8:21.63		
11	Mohamed Khaled Belabbas	France	8:22.38		SB
12	Silas Kosgei Kitum	Kenya	8:25.44		
13	Abdelhakim Zilali	France	8:25.82		
14	Jukka Keskisalo	Finland	8:26.72		SB
15	Alberto Paulo	Portugal	8:35.39		
—	Hassan Oubassour	France	DNF		
—	Vincent Zouaoui-Dandrieux	France	DNF		
—	Haron Lagat	Kenya	DNF		PM
—	Abel Mutai	Kenya	DNF		PM

High jump
Rank	Athlete	Nation	Time	Points	Notes
1st place, gold medalist(s)	Jaroslav Bába	Czech Republic	2.32 m	4	SB
1st place, gold medalist(s)	Aleksey Dmitrik	Russia	2.32 m	4	
3rd place, bronze medalist(s)	Ivan Ukhov	Russia	2.30 m	1	
4	Dmytro Dem'yanyuk	Ukraine	2.30 m		
5	Donald Thomas	Bahamas	2.28 m		
6	Andrey Silnov	Russia	2.28 m		
7	Kyriakos Ioannou	Cyprus	2.28 m		
8	Yaroslav Rybakov	Russia	2.26 m		=SB
9	Raúl Spank	Germany	2.23 m		
10	Mathias Cianci	France	2.15 m		

Pole vault
Rank	Athlete	Nation	Height	Points	Notes
1st place, gold medalist(s)	Renaud Lavillenie	France	5.73 m	4	
2nd place, silver medalist(s)	Jérôme Clavier	France	5.63 m	2	=SB
3rd place, bronze medalist(s)	Konstantinos Filippidis	Greece	5.63 m	1	
4	Romain Mesnil	France	5.53 m		
4	Raphael Holzdeppe	Germany	5.53 m		
4	Malte Mohr	Germany	5.53 m		
4	Fabian Schulze	Germany	5.53 m		SB
8	Alexander Straub	Germany	5.33 m		
9	Mark Hollis	United States	5.33 m		
—	Brad Walker	United States	NM		
—	Damiel Dossevi	France	NM		

Long jump
Rank	Athlete	Nation	Distance	Points	Notes
1st place, gold medalist(s)	Irving Saladino	Panama	8.40 m (+0.2 m/s)	4	SB
2nd place, silver medalist(s)	Chris Tomlinson	Great Britain	8.35 m (+0.9 m/s)	2	NR
3rd place, bronze medalist(s)	Greg Rutherford	Great Britain	8.27 m (+0.3 m/s)	1	SB
4	Godfrey Khotso Mokoena	South Africa	8.25 m (+0.7 m/s)		SB
5	Yahya Berrabah	Morocco	8.10 m (−0.1 m/s)		
6	Louis Tsatoumas	Greece	8.03 m (−0.1 m/s)		
7	Christian Reif	Germany	7.99 m (±0.0 m/s)		
8	Fabrice Lapierre	Australia	7.97 m (−1.0 m/s)		
9	Ignisious Gaisah	Ghana	7.90 m (+0.6 m/s)		
10	Morten Jensen	Denmark	7.87 m (+0.3 m/s)		
11	Kafétien Gomis	France	7.55 m (+1.2 m/s)		

Discus throw
Rank	Athlete	Nation	Distance	Points	Notes
1st place, gold medalist(s)	Robert Harting	Germany	67.32 m	4	
2nd place, silver medalist(s)	Piotr Małachowski	Poland	67.26 m	2	
3rd place, bronze medalist(s)	Gerd Kanter	Estonia	67.24 m	1	
4	Zoltán Kővágó	Hungary	65.26 m		SB
5	Benn Harradine	Australia	64.98 m		
6	Martin Wierig	Germany	64.20 m		
7	Virgilijus Alekna	Lithuania	63.74 m		
8	Märt Israel	Estonia	60.33 m		
9	Jean-François Aurokiom	France	56.84 m		
—	Frank Casañas	Spain	NM		

=== Women's ===
100 Metres
Rank	Athlete	Nation	Time	Points	Notes
1st place, gold medalist(s)	Kelly-Ann Baptiste	Trinidad and Tobago	10.91	4	SB
2nd place, silver medalist(s)	Veronica Campbell Brown	Jamaica	10.95	2	
3rd place, bronze medalist(s)	Kerron Stewart	Jamaica	11.04	1	
4	Ivet Lalova-Collio	Bulgaria	11.18		
5	Shalonda Solomon	United States	11.19		SB
6	Sherone Simpson	Jamaica	11.33		
7	Véronique Mang	France	11.33		
8	Myriam Soumaré	France	11.36		
9	LaShauntea Moore	United States	11.39		
			Wind: (+0.6 m/s)		

800 Metres
Rank	Athlete	Nation	Time	Points	Notes
1st place, gold medalist(s)	Caster Semenya	South Africa	2:00.18	4	
2nd place, silver medalist(s)	Halima Hachlaf	Morocco	2:00.60	2	
3rd place, bronze medalist(s)	Jenny Meadows	Great Britain	2:00.74	1	
4	Alysia Montaño	United States	2:00.78		
5	Hind Dehiba	France	2:01.45		
6	Zahra Bouras	Algeria	2:01.73		
7	Sviatlana Usovich	Belarus	2:01.78		
8	Yusneysi Santiusti	Cuba	2:02.55		
9	Yvonne Hak	Netherlands	2:08.09		
—	Kenia Sinclair	Jamaica	DNF		
—	Clarisse Moh	France	DNF		PM

5000 Metres
Rank	Athlete	Nation	Time	Points	Notes
1st place, gold medalist(s)	Meseret Defar	Ethiopia	14:29.52	4	WL
2nd place, silver medalist(s)	Sentayehu Ejigu	Ethiopia	14:31.66	2	SB
3rd place, bronze medalist(s)	Mercy Cherono	Kenya	14:35.13	1	PB
4	Shalane Flanagan	United States	14:45.20		SB
5	Dolores Checa	Spain	14:46.89		
6	Sule Utura	Ethiopia	14:56.05		
7	Hiwot Ayalew	Ethiopia	14:57.62		
8	Emebet Anteneh	Ethiopia	14:57.66		
9	Azemra Gebru	Ethiopia	14:58.34		
10	Amy Cragg	United States	15:15.30		
11	Genet Yalew	Ethiopia	15:15.67		SB
12	Jennifer Rhines	United States	15:30.97		
—	Ana Dulce Félix	Portugal	DNF		
—	Genzebe Dibaba	Ethiopia	DNF		
—	Mary Wangari	Kenya	DNF		PM

400 Metres hurdles
Rank	Athlete	Nation	Time	Points	Notes
1st place, gold medalist(s)	Zuzana Hejnová	Czech Republic	53.29	4	NR, WL
2nd place, silver medalist(s)	Kaliese Spencer	Jamaica	53.45	2	=SB
3rd place, bronze medalist(s)	Natalya Antyukh	Russia	54.41	1	SB
4	Perri Shakes-Drayton	Great Britain	54.79		
5	Melaine Walker	Jamaica	55.06		
6	Vania Stambolova	Bulgaria	55.51		
7	Ristananna Bailey-Cole	Jamaica	56.32		
8	Phara Anacharsis	France	56.53		PB

Triple jump
Rank	Athlete	Nation	Distance	Points	Notes
1st place, gold medalist(s)	Yargelis Savigne	Cuba	14.99 m (−0.1 m/s)	4	WL
2nd place, silver medalist(s)	Olha Saladukha	Ukraine	14.81 m (±0.0 m/s)	2	
3rd place, bronze medalist(s)	Olga Rypakova	Kazakhstan	14.48 m (+0.2 m/s)	1	SB
4	Simona La Mantia	Italy	14.33 m (−0.3 m/s)		
5	Mabel Gay	Cuba	14.31 m (−0.7 m/s)		
6	Dana Velďáková	Slovakia	14.25 m (+0.4 m/s)		=SB
7	Katja Demut	Germany	14.06 m (+0.3 m/s)		
8	Baya Rahouli	Algeria	13.97 m (−0.2 m/s)		

Shot put
Rank	Athlete	Nation	Distance	Points	Notes
1st place, gold medalist(s)	Valerie Adams	New Zealand	20.78 m	4	MR
2nd place, silver medalist(s)	~~Nadzeya Astapchuk~~	~~Belarus~~	~~20.49 m~~	~~2~~	DQ (Note: Due to doping violations Astapchuk's results during this competition were disqualified.)
3rd place, bronze medalist(s)	Jillian Camarena-Williams	United States	20.18 m	1	=NR
4	Cleopatra Borel	Trinidad and Tobago	19.42 m		NR
5	Misleydis González	Cuba	18.87 m		SB
6	Michelle Carter	United States	18.38 m		
7	Nadine Kleinert	Germany	18.01 m		
8	Jessica Cérival	France	17.12 m		

Javelin throw
Rank	Athlete	Nation	Distance	Points	Notes
1st place, gold medalist(s)	Christina Obergföll	Germany	68.01 m	4	MR, WL
2nd place, silver medalist(s)	Barbora Špotáková	Czech Republic	67.57 m	2	SB
3rd place, bronze medalist(s)	~~Mariya Abakumova~~	~~Russia~~	~~65.12 m~~	~~1~~	DQ (Note: Due to doping violations Abakumova's results during this competition were disqualified.)
4	Goldie Sayers	Great Britain	62.14 m		
5	Kim Mickle	Australia	61.97 m		
6	Sunette Viljoen	South Africa	61.74 m		SB
7	Katharina Molitor	Germany	61.74 m		
8	Kara Winger	United States	58.21 m		

== See also ==
- 2011 Diamond League
