= 2011 Diamond League =

2011 IAAF Diamond League
- Edition: 2nd
- Dates: 6 May–16 September
- Events: 32
- Meetings: 14

The 2011 IAAF Diamond League (also known as the 2011 Samsung Diamond League for sponsorship purposes) was the second edition of the Diamond League, an annual series of fourteen one-day track and field meetings. The series began on 6 May in Doha, Qatar and ended on 16 September in Brussels, Belgium.

== Meeting calendar ==
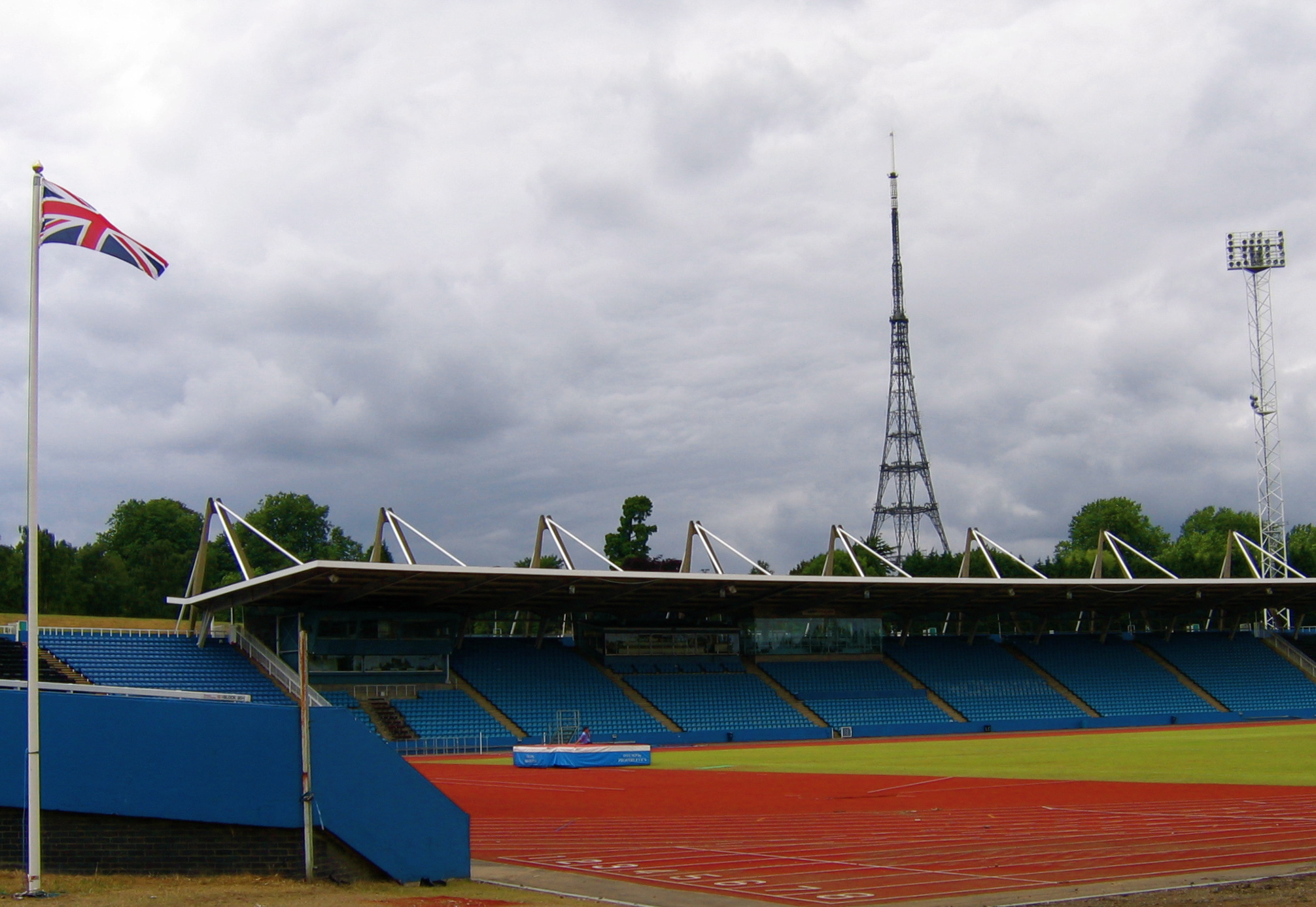
Crystal Palace in London. One of the venues for the series.

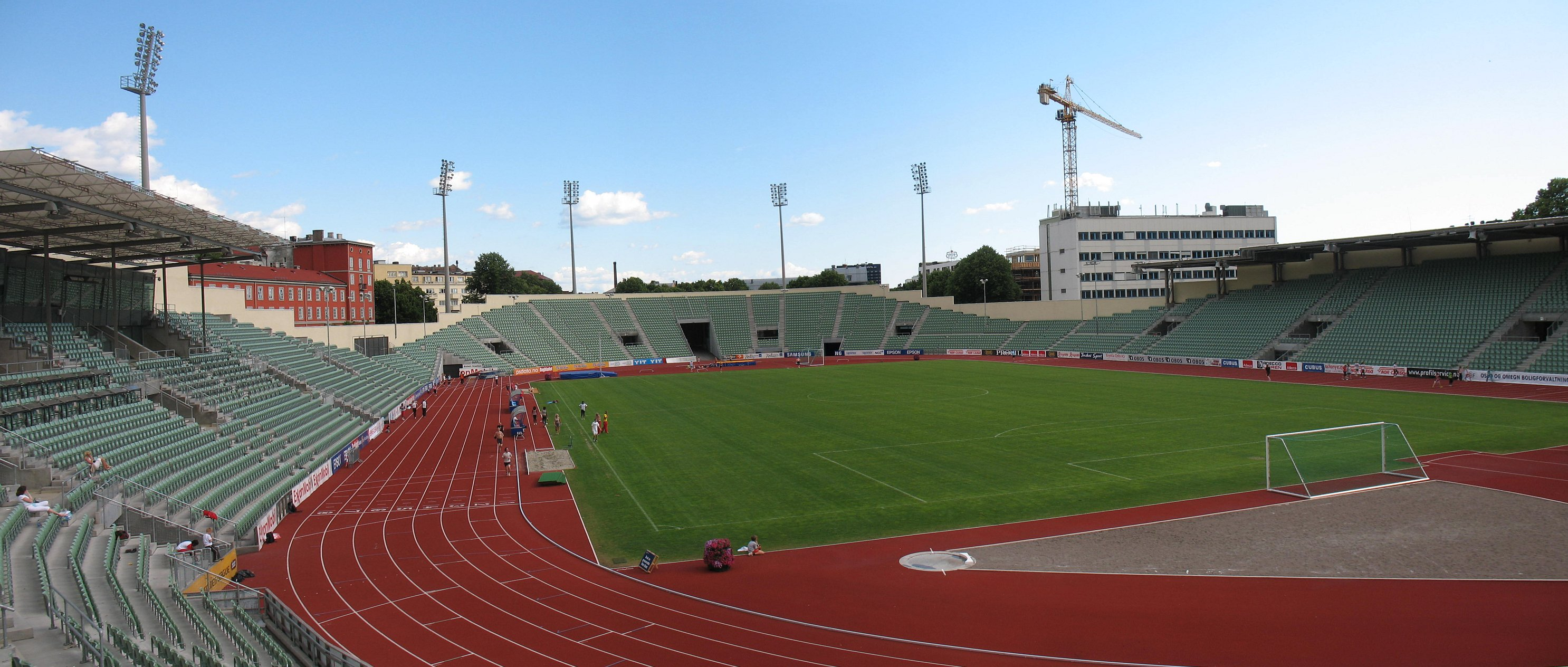
The Bislett Games have been held at Bislett Stadion since 1965.

Date	Meet	Stadium	City	Country
6 May	Qatar Athletic Super Grand Prix	Qatar SC Stadium	Doha	Qatar
15 May	Shanghai Golden Grand Prix	Shanghai Stadium	Shanghai	China
26 May	Golden Gala	Stadio Olimpico	Rome	Italy
4 June	Prefontaine Classic	Hayward Field	Eugene	United States
9 June	Bislett Games	Bislett Stadion	Oslo	Norway
11 June	Adidas Grand Prix	Icahn Stadium	New York City	United States
30 June	Athletissima	Stade Olympique de la Pontaise	Lausanne	Switzerland
8 July	Meeting Areva	Stade de France	Saint-Denis	France
10 July	Aviva British Grand Prix	Alexander Stadium	Birmingham	United Kingdom
22 July	Herculis	Stade Louis II	Fontvieille	Monaco
29 July	DN Galan	Stockholm Olympic Stadium	Stockholm	Sweden
5–6 August	London Grand Prix	Crystal Palace	London	United Kingdom
8 September	Weltklasse Zürich	Letzigrund	Zürich	Switzerland
16 September	Memorial van Damme	King Baudouin Stadium	Brussels	Belgium

== Ambassadors ==
A total of fourteen athletes were given Diamond League Ambassador status, with the intention of bringing attention to some of the sport's foremost competitors. There are seven male and seven female athletes, and the division between track and field specialists is also evenly divided.

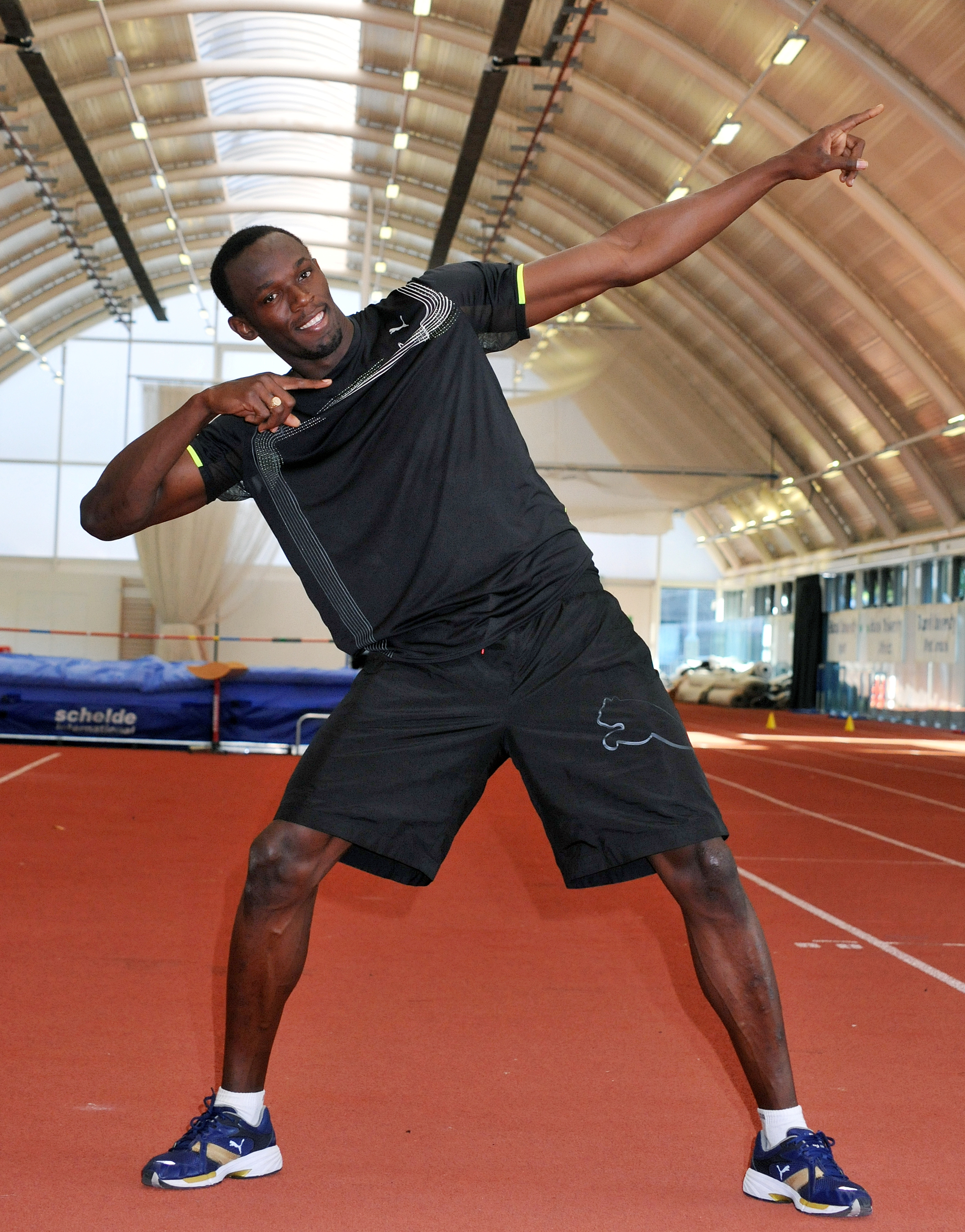
World record holder Usain Bolt is the most prominent ambassador.

Athlete	Country	Event(s)
Usain Bolt	Jamaica	100 metres/200 metres
Tyson Gay	United States	100 metres/200 metres
Asafa Powell	Jamaica	100 metres
Shelly-Ann Fraser	Jamaica	100 metres
Allyson Felix	United States	200 metres/400 metres
Sanya Richards	United States	400 metres
Kenenisa Bekele	Ethiopia	5000 metres/10,000 metres
Steven Hooker	Australia	Pole vault
Yelena Isinbayeva	Russia	Pole vault
Blanka Vlašić	Croatia	High jump
Valerie Vili	New Zealand	Shot put
Andreas Thorkildsen	Norway	Javelin throw
Tero Pitkämäki	Finland	Javelin throw
Barbora Špotáková	Czech Republic	Javelin throw

== Diamond Race winners ==
- Winners in blue defended their 2010 Diamond Race title

Track winners
Event	Men	Women
100 metres	Asafa Powell (JAM)	Carmelita Jeter (USA)
200 metres	Walter Dix (USA)	Carmelita Jeter (USA)
400 metres	Kirani James (GRN)	Amantle Montsho (BOT)
800 metres	David Rudisha (KEN)	Jenny Meadows (GBR)
1500 metres/ Mile run	Nixon Chepseba (KEN)	Morgan Uceny (USA)
5000 metres/ 3000 metres	Imane Merga (ETH)	Vivian Cheruiyot (KEN)
110 m hurdles/ 100 m hurdles	Dayron Robles (CUB)	Danielle Carruthers (USA)
400 m hurdles	Dai Greene (GBR)	Kaliese Spencer (JAM)
3000 m s'chase	Paul Kipsiele Koech (KEN)	Milcah Chemos Cheywa (KEN)

Field winners
Event	Men	Women
Long jump	Mitchell Watt (AUS)	Brittney Reese (USA)
Triple jump	Phillips Idowu (GBR)	Olha Saladukha (UKR)
High jump	Jesse Williams (USA)	Blanka Vlašić (CRO)
Pole vault	Renaud Lavillenie (FRA)	Silke Spiegelburg (GER)
Shot put	Dylan Armstrong (CAN)	Valerie Adams (NZL)
Discus throw	Virgilijus Alekna (LTU)	Yarelis Barrios (CUB)
Javelin throw	Matthias de Zordo (GER)	Christina Obergföll (GER)

== Winners ==
Diamond Race track events
Men	100 m	200 m	400 m	800 m	1500 m / Mile	5000 m	110 m hurdles	400 m hurdles	3000 m steeplechase
Women	100 m	200 m	400 m	800 m	1500 m	5000 m	100 m hurdles	400 m hurdles	3000 m steeplechase

Diamond Race field events
Men	Pole vault	High jump	Long jump	Triple jump	Shot put	Discus throw	Javelin throw
Women	Pole vault	High jump	Long jump	Triple jump	Shot put	Discus throw	Javelin throw

=== Men ===
==== Track ====
#	Meeting	100 m	200 m	400 m	800 m	1500 m	5000 m	110 m h	400 m h	3000 m st
1	Doha	–	Walter Dix (USA); 20.06 WL, =MR	–	Asbel Kiprop (KEN); 1:44.74 SB	–	Yenew Alamirew (ETH); 7:27.26 WL, MR	–	L. J. van Zyl (RSA); 48.11 MR	–
2	Shanghai	Asafa Powell (JAM); 9.95	–	Calvin Smith Jr. (USA); 45.47	–	Nixon Chepseba (KEN); 3:31.42 WL, MR	–	Liu Xiang (CHN); 13.07 WL	–	Brimin Kipruto (KEN); 8:02.28 WL, MR
3	Rome	Usain Bolt (JAM); 9.91	–	–	Khadevis Robinson (USA); 1:45.09 SB	–	Imane Merga (ETH); 12:54.21 WL	–	L. J. van Zyl (RSA); 47.91	–
4	Eugene	Steve Mullings (JAM); 9.80 MR	Walter Dix (USA); 20.19	Angelo Taylor (USA); 45.16 SB	–	Haron Keitany (KEN); 3:49.09 WL	–	David Oliver (USA); 12.94 WL	–	Ezekiel Kemboi (KEN); 8:08.34
5	Oslo	–	Usain Bolt (JAM); 19.86	–	–	Asbel Kiprop (KEN); 3:50.86	–	Aries Merritt (USA); 13.12 SB	–	Paul Kipsiele Koech (KEN); 8:01.83 WL, MR
6	New York	Steve Mullings (JAM); 10.26	–	Jeremy Wariner (USA); 45.13	Alfred Kirwa Yego (KEN); 1:46.57	–	Dejen Gebremeskel (ETH); 13:05.22	–	Javier Culson (PUR); 48.50 SB	–
7	Lausanne	Asafa Powell (JAM); 9.78 WL	–	–	David Rudisha (KEN); 1:44.15	–	Vincent Chepkok (KEN); 12:59.13 MR	–	Dai Greene (GBR); 48.41	–
8	Paris	–	Usain Bolt (JAM); 20.03	Chris Brown (BAH); 44.94 SB	–	Amine Laâlou (MAR); 3:32.15	–	Dayron Robles (CUB); 13.09	–	Mahiedine Mekhissi-Benabbad (FRA); 8:02.09 PB
9	Birmingham	Asafa Powell (JAM); 9.91	–	–	Abubaker Kaki Khamis (SUD); 1:44.54	–	Mo Farah (GBR); 13:06.14	–	Dai Greene (GBR); 48.20 SB	–
10	Monaco	Usain Bolt (JAM); 9.88	–	–	David Rudisha (KEN); 1:42.61 WL	–	Mo Farah (GBR); 12:53.11 WL, MR, NR	–	Angelo Taylor (USA); 47.97	Brimin Kipruto (KEN); 7:53.64 MR, AR
11	Stockholm	–	Usain Bolt (JAM); 20.03	Jermaine Gonzales (JAM); 44.69 SB	–	Silas Kiplagat (KEN); 3:33.94	–	Jason Richardson (USA); 13.17	–	Paul Kipsiele Koech (KEN); 8:05.92
12	London	–	Walter Dix (USA); 20.16	Kirani James (GRN); 44.61 WL	–	Leonel Manzano (USA); 3:51.24	–	Dayron Robles (CUB); 13.04 MR	–	–
13	Zürich	Yohan Blake (JAM); 9.82 PB	–	Kirani James (GRN); 44.36 NR	–	Nixon Chepseba (KEN); 3:32.74	–	Dayron Robles (CUB); 13.01 SB	–	Ezekiel Kemboi (KEN); 8:07.72
14	Brussels	Usain Bolt (JAM); 9.76 WL, MR	Yohan Blake (JAM); 19.26 WL, MR	–	David Rudisha (KEN); 1:43.96	–	Imane Merga (ETH); 12:58.32	–	Javier Culson (PUR); 48.32 SB	–
Overall winner		Asafa Powell (JAM)	Walter Dix (USA)	Kirani James (GRN)	David Rudisha (KEN)	Nixon Kiplimo Chepseba (KEN)	Imane Merga (ETH)	Dayron Robles (CUB)	Dai Greene (GBR)	Paul Kipsiele Koech (KEN)

- In Eugene, Oslo and London, mile races are counted to the Diamond League standings for the 1500 m.
- In Doha, 3000 metre race is counted to the Diamond League standings for the 5000 m.

==== Field ====
#	Meeting	Long jump	Triple jump	High jump	Pole vault	Shot put	Discus	Javelin
1	Doha	–	Teddy Tamgho (FRA); 17.49 WL, MR	Jesse Williams (USA); 2.33 =MR	Malte Mohr (GER); 5.81 WL, MR	Dylan Armstrong (CAN); 21.38	Gerd Kanter (EST); 67.49 WL	Petr Frydrych (CZE); 85.32
2	Shanghai	Mitchell Watt (AUS); 8.44 =WL, MR	–	–	–	–	–	Tero Pitkämäki (FIN); 85.33 =WL
3	Rome	–	Phillips Idowu (GBR); 17.59 WL	–	Renaud Lavillenie (FRA); 5.82 WL	Dylan Armstrong (CAN); 21.60	–	–
4	Eugene	Greg Rutherford (GBR); 8.32w	–	Raúl Spank (GER); 2.32 =SB	–	–	Robert Harting (GER); 68.40	–
5	Oslo	Godfrey Khotso Mokoena (RSA); 8.08	–	Kyriakos Ioannou (CYP); 2.28	–	–	Gerd Kanter (EST); 65.14	Matthias de Zordo (GER); 83.94
6	New York	–	Phillips Idowu (GBR); 16.67	–	Romain Mesnil (FRA); 5.52	–	–	–
7	Lausanne	–	Teddy Tamgho (FRA); 17.91 WL, MR	–	Renaud Lavillenie (FRA); 5.83 =SB	Christian Cantwell (USA); 21.83 MR	–	Andreas Thorkildsen (NOR); 88.19 SB
8	Paris	Irving Saladino (PAN); 8.40 SB	–	Jaroslav Bába (CZE); 2.32 SB; Aleksey Dmitrik (RUS); 2.32	Renaud Lavillenie (FRA); 5.73	–	Robert Harting (GER); 67.32	–
9	Birmingham	–	Phillips Idowu (GBR); 17.54	–	–	Dylan Armstrong (CAN); 21.55	–	Andreas Thorkildsen (NOR); 88.30 WL
10	Monaco	–	Phillips Idowu (GBR); 17.36	–	Renaud Lavillenie (FRA); 5.90 WL	Reese Hoffa (USA); 21.25 MR	–	–
11	Stockholm	Mitchell Watt (AUS); 8.54 AR	–	Ivan Ukhov (RUS); 2.34 =SB	–	–	Virgilijus Alekna (LTU); 65.05	Andreas Thorkildsen (NOR); 88.43 WL
12	London	Mitchell Watt (AUS); 8.45 MR	–	Andrey Silnov (RUS); 2.36 SB	–	–	Virgilijus Alekna (LTU); 66.71	–
13	Zürich	Ngonidzashe Makusha (ZIM); 8.00	–	Dimitrios Chondrokoukis (GRE); 2.32 =PB	–	Dylan Armstrong (CAN); 21.63	Robert Harting (GER); 67.02	–
14	Brussels	–	Benjamin Compaoré (FRA); 17.31 PB	–	Konstadinos Filippidis (GRE); 5.72	Reese Hoffa (USA); 22.09 SB	–	Matthias de Zordo (GER); 88.36 PB
Overall winner		Mitchell Watt (AUS)	Phillips Idowu (GBR)	Jesse Williams (USA)	Renaud Lavillenie (FRA)	Dylan Armstrong (CAN)	Virgilijus Alekna (LTU)	Matthias de Zordo (GER)

=== Women ===
==== Track ====
#	Meeting	100 m	200 m	400 m	800 m	1500 m	5000 m	100 m h	400 m h	3000 m st
1	Doha	–	LaShauntea Moore (USA); 22.83	Allyson Felix (USA); 50.33 WL	–	Anna Mishchenko (UKR); 4:03.00 WL	–	Kellie Wells (USA); 12.58 WL	–	Milcah Cheywa (KEN); 9:16.44 WL, MR
2	Shanghai	Veronica Campbell-Brown (JAM); 10.92	–	–	Jenny Meadows (GBR); 2:00.54	–	Vivian Cheruiyot (KEN); 14:31.92 WL	–	Kaliese Spencer (JAM); 54.20 WL	–
3	Rome	–	Bianca Knight (USA); 22.64 SB	Allyson Felix (USA); 49.81 WL	–	Maryam Yusuf Jamal (BHR); 4:01.60 WL	–	Dawn Harper (USA); 12.70 SB	–	Milcah Cheywa (KEN); 9:12.89 WL
4	Eugene	Carmelita Jeter (USA); 10.70 WL, MR	–	–	Kenia Sinclair (JAM); 1:58.29 WL	–	Vivian Cheruiyot (KEN); 14:33.96 MR	–	Lashinda Demus (USA); 53.31 WL	–
5	Oslo	Ivet Lalova (BUL); 11.01w	–	Amantle Montsho (BOT); 50.10 SB	Halima Hachlaf (MAR); 1:58.27 WL	–	Meseret Defar (ETH); 14:37.32	–	Zuzana Hejnová (CZE); 54.38	–
6	New York	–	Allyson Felix (USA); 22.92	–	–	Kenia Sinclair (JAM); 4:08.06	–	Danielle Carruthers (USA); 13.04	–	Milcah Cheywa (KEN); 9:27.29
7	Lausanne	–	Mariya Ryemyen (UKR); 22.85	Amantle Montsho (BOT); 50.23	–	Morgan Uceny (USA); 4:05.52	–	Sally Pearson (AUS); 12.47w	–	Milcah Cheywa (KEN); 9:19.87 MR
8	Paris	Kelly-Ann Baptiste (TRI); 10.91 SB	–	–	Caster Semenya (RSA); 2:00.18	–	Meseret Defar (ETH); 14:29.52 WL	–	Zuzana Hejnová (CZE); 53.29 WL, NR	–
9	Birmingham	–	Bianca Knight (USA); 22.59	Amantle Montsho (BOT); 50.20	–	Morgan Uceny (USA); 4:05.64	–	Sally Pearson (AUS); 12.48 WL, MR, AR	–	Sofia Assefa (ETH); 9:25.87 MR
10	Monaco	–	Carmelita Jeter (USA); 22.20 PB	Amantle Montsho (BOT); 49.71 NR	–	Maryam Yusuf Jamal (BHR); 4:00.59	–	Sally Pearson (AUS); 12.51	–	–
11	Stockholm	Carmelita Jeter (USA); 11.15	–	–	Kenia Sinclair (JAM); 1:58.21 SB	–	Vivian Cheruiyot (KEN); 14:20.87 WL, NR	–	Kaliese Spencer (JAM); 53.74 MR	–
12	London	Carmelita Jeter (USA); 10.93	–	–	Jenny Meadows (GBR); 1:58.60 SB	–	Lauren Fleshman (USA); 15:00.57 SB	–	Kaliese Spencer (JAM); 52.79 WL, MR	Milcah Cheywa (KEN); 9:22.80
13	Zürich	–	Carmelita Jeter (USA); 22.27	–	Alysia Johnson (USA); 1:58.41	–	Vivian Cheruiyot (KEN); 14:30.10 MR	–	Kaliese Spencer (JAM); 53.36	–
14	Brussels	Carmelita Jeter (USA); 10.78	–	Amantle Montsho (BOT); 50.16	–	Morgan Uceny (USA); 4:00.06 WL	–	Danielle Carruthers (USA); 12.65	–	Yuliya Zaripova (RUS); 9:15.43 MR
Overall winner		Carmelita Jeter (USA)	Carmelita Jeter (USA)	Amantle Montsho (BOT)	Jenny Meadows (GBR)	Morgan Uceny (USA)	Vivian Cheruiyot (KEN)	Danielle Carruthers (USA)	Kaliese Spencer (JAM)	Milcah Cheywa (KEN)

==== Field ====
#	Meeting	Long jump	Triple jump	High jump	Pole vault	Shot put	Discus	Javelin
1	Doha	Funmi Jimoh (USA); 6.88 WL	–	–	–	–	–	–
2	Shanghai	–	Yargelis Savigne (CUB); 14.68	Blanka Vlašić (CRO); 1.94 =WL	Silke Spiegelburg (GER); 4.55 SB	Gong Lijiao (CHN); 19.94 SB	Li Yanfeng (CHN); 62.73	–
3	Rome	Brittney Reese (USA); 6.94 SB	–	Blanka Vlašić (CRO); 1.95 SB	–	–	Yarelys Barrios (CUB); 64.18	Christina Obergföll (GER); 63.97
4	Eugene	–	Olha Saladuha (UKR); 14.98 WL, MR	–	Anna Rogowska (POL); 4.68	Jillian Camarena (USA); 19.76 (PB) WL, MR	–	Christina Obergföll (GER); 65.48 SB
5	Oslo	–	Yargelis Savigne (CUB); 14.81	–	Fabiana Murer (BRA); 4.60	Valerie Adams (NZL); 20.26 MR	–	–
6	New York	Funmi Jimoh (USA); 6.48	–	Emma Green Tregaro (SWE); 1.94 SB	–	–	Stephanie Brown Trafton (USA); 62.94	Christina Obergföll (GER); 64.43 MR
7	Lausanne	Brittney Reese (USA); 6.85	–	Anna Chicherova (RUS); 1.95	–	–	Yarelys Barrios (CUB); 64.29 SB	–
8	Paris	–	Yargelis Savigne (CUB); 14.99 WL	–	–	Valerie Adams (NZL); 20.78 =MR	–	Christina Obergföll (GER); 68.01 WL, MR
9	Birmingham	Janay DeLoach (USA); 6.78	–	Blanka Vlašić (CRO); 1.99	Silke Spiegelburg (GER); 4.66	–	Nadine Müller (GER); 65.75	–
10	Monaco	Brittney Reese (USA); 6.82	–	Blanka Vlašić (CRO); 1.97	–	–	Nadine Müller (GER); 65.90	Barbora Špotáková (CZE); 69.45 WL, MR
11	Stockholm	–	Olha Saladuha (UKR); 15.06w	–	Yelena Isinbayeva (RUS); 4.76 SB	Valerie Adams (NZL); 20.57	–	–
12	London	–	Olha Saladuha (UKR); 14.80	–	Jenn Suhr (USA); 4.79	Valerie Adams (NZL); 20.07	–	Christina Obergföll (GER); 66.74 MR
13	Zürich	Brittney Reese (USA); 6.72	–	–	Jenn Suhr (USA); 4.72	Valerie Adams (NZL); 20.51	–	Christina Obergföll (GER); 69.57 MR
14	Brussels	–	Olha Saladuha (UKR); 14.67	Anna Chicherova (RUS); 2.05	–	–	Li Yanfeng (CHN); 66.27	–
Overall winner		Brittney Reese (USA)	Olha Saladuha (UKR)	Blanka Vlašić (CRO)	Silke Spiegelburg (GER)	Valerie Adams (NZL)	Yarelys Barrios (CUB)	Christina Obergföll (GER)

== Results ==
Doha
Event	1st +4 pts	2nd +2 pts	3rd +1 pts	4th ⠀	5th ⠀	6th ⠀	7th ⠀	8th ⠀
Men's 200m (+0.5 m/s)	Walter Dix; USA | 20.06	Femi Ogunode; QAT | 20.30	Jaysuma Saidy Ndure; NOR | 20.55	Jordan Boase; USA | 20.60	Mario Forsythe; JAM | 20.86	Ainsley Waugh; JAM | 20.90	Omar Jouma Bilal al Salfa; UAE | 21.32	
Men's 800m	Asbel Kiprop; KEN | 1:44.74	Michael Rimmer; GBR | 1:45.12	Alfred Kirwa Yego; KEN | 1:45.17	Richard Kiplagat; KEN | 1:45.48	Antonio Manuel Reina; ESP | 1:45.55	Marcin Lewandowski; POL | 1:46.42	Hamza Driouch; QAT | 1:50.25	Belal Mansoor Ali; BRN | DNS
Men's 3000m	Yenew Alamirew; ETH | 7:27.26	Edwin Cheruiyot Soi; KEN | 7:27.55	Eliud Kipchoge; KEN | 7:27.66	Augustine Kiprono Choge; KEN | 7:28.76	Vincent Kiprop Chepkok; KEN | 7:30.15	Daniel Kipchirchir Komen; KEN | 7:31.41	Moses Ndiema Kipsiro; UGA | 7:31.83	Tariku Bekele; ETH | 7:33.50
Men's 400mH	LJ van Zyl; RSA | 48.11	Cornel Fredericks; RSA | 48.43	Bershawn Jackson; USA | 48.44	Kurt Leone Couto; MOZ | 50.03	LaRon Bennett; USA | 50.28	Richard Yates; GBR | 50.34	Georg Fleischhauer; GER | 50.46	
Men's High Jump	Jesse Williams; USA | 2.33 m	Kyriakos Ioannou; CYP | 2.33 m	Mutaz Essa Barshim; QAT | 2.31 m	Donald Thomas; BAH | 2.29 m	Dusty Jonas; USA | 2.29 m	Aleksey Dmitrik; RUS | 2.29 m	Konstantinos Baniotis; GRE | 2.26 m	Tom Parsons; GBR | 2.23 m
Men's Pole Vault	Malte Mohr; GER | 5.81 m	Maksym Mazuryk; UKR | 5.70 m	Lázaro Borges; CUB | 5.60 m	Renaud Lavillenie; FRA | 5.50 m	Alhaji Jeng; SWE | 5.40 m	Mark Hollis; USA | 5.40 m	Mateusz Didenkow; POL | 5.40 m	Fabian Schulze; GER | 5.40 m
Men's Triple Jump	Teddy Tamgho; FRA | 17.49 m	Leevan Sands; BAH | 17.09 m	Alexis Copello; CUB | 17.05 m	Yoann Rapinier; FRA | 16.21 m	Sief El Islem Temacini; ALG | 16.03 m	Mohammed Abbas Darwish; UAE | 15.90 m	Randy Lewis; GRN | 15.83 m	Tosin Oke; NGR | DNS m
Men's Shot Put	Dylan Armstrong; CAN | 21.38 m	Reese Hoffa; USA | 21.27 m	Ryan Whiting; USA | 21.23 m	Māris Urtāns; LAT | 20.82 m	Christian Cantwell; USA | 20.79 m	Tomasz Majewski; POL | 20.68 m	Maksim Sidorov; RUS | 20.17 m	Pavel Lyzhyn; BLR | 20.11 m
Men's Discus Throw	Gerd Kanter; EST | 67.49 m	Virgilijus Alekna; LTU | 65.92 m	Frank Casanas; ESP | 64.22 m	Ehsan Hadadi; IRI | 64.16 m	Piotr Małachowski; POL | 63.59 m	Bogdan Pishchalnikov; RUS | 61.08 m	Jason Young; USA | 60.45 m	Zoltán Kővágó; HUN | 60.24 m
Men's Javelin Throw	Petr Frydrych; CZE | 85.32 m	Robert Oosthuizen; RSA | 84.38 m	Tero Pitkämäki; FIN | 83.91 m	Sergey Makarov; RUS | 83.78 m	Andreas Thorkildsen; NOR | 83.63 m	Vítězslav Veselý; CZE | 83.59 m	Vadims Vasiļevskis; LAT | 82.65 m	Matthias de Zordo; GER | 82.45 m
Women's 200m (+0.3 m/s)	LaShauntea Moore; USA | 22.83	Charonda Williams; USA | 22.95	Patricia Hall; JAM | 23.16	Blessing Okagbare; NGR | 23.19	Aleksandra Fedoriva-Spayer; RUS | 23.31	Consuella Moore; USA | 23.85	Yelizaveta Demirova; RUS | 23.98	Alexandria Anderson; USA | DNS
Women's 400m	Allyson Felix; USA | 50.33	Amantle Montsho; BOT | 50.41	Patricia Hall; JAM | 51.74	Muriel Hurtis; FRA | 52.30	Davita Prendergast; JAM | 52.43	Monica Hargrove; USA | 52.49	Amy Mbacké Thiam; SEN | 52.82	Floria Guei; FRA | 54.00
Women's 1500m	Anna Mishchenko; UKR | 4:03.00	Irene Jelagat; KEN | 4:04.89	Siham Hilali; MAR | 4:05.18	Viola Jelagat Kibiwot; KEN | 4:05.54	Kalkidan Gezahegne; ETH | 4:06.52	Ibtissam Lakhouad; MAR | 4:07.60	Renata Pliś; POL | 4:09.51	Malika Akkaoui; MAR | 4:09.88
Women's 100mH (+1.3 m/s)	Kellie Wells; USA | 12.58	Danielle Carruthers; USA | 12.64	Lolo Jones; USA | 12.67	Ginnie Crawford; USA | 12.73	Nichole Denby; USA | 12.98	Yvette Lewis; USA | 13.07	Celriece Law; USA | 13.19	Sandra Gomis; FRA | 13.23
Women's 3000mSC	Milcah Chemos; KEN | 9:16.44	Mercy Wanjiku Njoroge; KEN | 9:16.94	Lydia Chebet Rotich; KEN | 9:19.20	Sofia Assefa; ETH | 9:25.08	Birtukan Fente Alemu; ETH | 9:38.29	Mardrea Hyman; JAM | 10:04.57	Cristina Casandra; ROU | 10:06.45	Oxana Juravel; MDA | DNF
Women's Long Jump	Funmi Jimoh; USA | 6.88 m	Maurren Higa Maggi; BRA | 6.87 m	Anna Klyashtornaya; RUS | 6.77 m	Tatyana Kotova; RUS | 6.74 m	Éloyse Lesueur-Aymonin; FRA | 6.66 m	Ivana Vuleta; SRB | 6.63 m	Yuliya Pidluzhnaya; RUS | 6.59 m	Ineta Radēviča; LAT | 6.55 m

Shanghai
Event	1st +4 pts	2nd +2 pts	3rd +1 pts	4th ⠀	5th ⠀	6th ⠀	7th ⠀	8th ⠀
Men's 100m (+0.3 m/s)	Asafa Powell; JAM | 9.95	Michael Rodgers; USA | 10.01	Mario Forsythe; JAM | 10.12	Churandy Martina; NED | 10.19	Rae Monzavous Edwards; USA | 10.31	Peimeng Zhang; CHN | 10.36	Yi Lao; CHN | 10.37	Shinji Takahira; JPN | 10.51
Men's 400m	Calvin Smith; USA | 45.47	Greg Nixon; USA | 45.50	David Neville; USA | 45.58	Yuzo Kanemaru; JPN | 45.85	Nery Brenes; CRC | 45.99	Rabah Yousif; SUD | 46.03	Sean Wroe; AUS | 46.88	Chen Jianxin; CHN | 46.97
Men's 1500m	Nixon Kiplimo Chepseba; KEN | 3:31.42	Asbel Kiprop; KEN | 3:31.76	Mekonnen Gebremedhin; ETH | 3:32.36	Silas Kiplagat; KEN | 3:32.70	Augustine Kiprono Choge; KEN | 3:33.38	Daniel Kipchirchir Komen; KEN | 3:33.41	Bethwell Birgen; KEN | 3:34.59	Geoffrey Kipkoech Rono; KEN | 3:35.07
Men's 110mH (+0.2 m/s)	Xiang Liu; CHN | 13.07	David Oliver; USA | 13.18	Aries Merritt; USA | 13.24	Dwight Thomas; JAM | 13.31	Dongpeng Shi; CHN | 13.52	Joel Brown; USA | 13.59	Ryan Wilson; USA | 13.63	Wenjun Xie; CHN | 13.63
Men's 3000mSC	Brimin Kiprop Kipruto; KEN | 8:02.28	Paul Kipsiele Koech; KEN | 8:02.42	Hilal Yego; KEN | 8:07.71	Tarik Langat Akdag; KEN | 8:08.59	Richard Kipkemboi Mateelong; KEN | 8:11.07	Benjamin Kiplagat; UGA | 8:12.87	Elijah Chelimo; KEN | 8:20.53	Silas Kosgei Kitum; KEN | 8:20.87
Men's Long Jump	Mitchell Watt; AUS | 8.44 m	Xiongfeng Su; CHN | 8.19 m	Ignisious Gaisah; GHA | 8.12 m	Dwight Phillips; USA | 8.07 m	Xiaoyi Zhang; CHN | 8.04 m	Wilfredo Martínez; CUB | 7.96 m	Tyrone Smith; BER | 7.86 m	Kafétien Gomis; FRA | 7.73 m
Men's Javelin Throw	Tero Pitkämäki; FIN | 85.33 m	Andreas Thorkildsen; NOR | 85.12 m	Robert Oosthuizen; RSA | 83.73 m	Teemu Wirkkala; FIN | 82.39 m	Igor Janik; POL | 82.09 m	Petr Frydrych; CZE | 79.40 m	Qiang Qin; CHN | 79.22 m	Chen Qi; CHN | 78.08 m
Women's 100m (+1.2 m/s)	Veronica Campbell-Brown; JAM | 10.92	Carmelita Jeter; USA | 10.95	Blessing Okagbare; NGR | 11.23	LaShauntea Moore; USA | 11.25	Sherone Simpson; JAM | 11.28	Ruddy Zang Milama; GAB | 11.29	Gloria Asumnu; USA | 11.39	Jiabei Ye; CHN | 11.83
Women's 800m	Jennifer Meadows; GBR | 2:00.54	Malika Akkaoui; MAR | 2:01.45	Angelika Cichocka; POL | 2:01.75	Lenka Masná; CZE | 2:02.21	Renata Pliś; POL | 2:02.67	Ewelina Sętowska-Dryk; POL | 2:03.00	Eunice Jepkoech Sum; KEN | 2:03.09	Heather Kampf; USA | 2:03.85
Women's 5000m	Vivian Jepkemei Cheruiyot; KEN | 14:31.92	Sentayehu Ejigu; ETH | 14:32.87	Linet Chepkwemoi Masai; KEN | 14:32.95	Viola Jelagat Kibiwot; KEN | 14:34.86	Mercy Cherono; KEN | 14:37.17	Priscah Jepleting Cherono; KEN | 14:40.86	Pauline Chemning Korikwiang; KEN | 14:41.28	Sule Utura; ETH | 14:46.32
Women's 400mH	Kaliese Carter; JAM | 54.20	Lashinda Demus; USA | 54.58	Melaine Walker; JAM | 54.96	Ajoke Odumosu; NGR | 56.39	Lauren Boden; AUS | 56.57	Satomi Kubokura; JPN | 56.94	Qi Yang; CHN | 57.23	Nicole Leach; USA | 58.41
Women's High Jump	Blanka Vlašić; CRO | 1.94 m	Xingjuan Zheng; CHN | 1.90 m	Vita Styopina; UKR | 1.90 m	Nadiya Dusanova; UZB | 1.90 m	Marina Aitova; KAZ | 1.90 m	Anna Ustinova; KAZ | 1.85 m	Ruth Beitia; ESP | 1.85 m	Svetlana Radzivil; UZB | 1.85 m
Women's Pole Vault	Silke Spiegelburg; GER | 4.55 m	Carolin Hingst; GER | 4.50 m	Mary Saxer; USA | 4.50 m	Aleksandra Kiryashova; RUS | 4.40 m	Jillian Schwartz; ISR | 4.40 m	Anastasiya Savchenko; RUS | 4.40 m	Li Ling; CHN | 4.40 m	Yarisley Silva; CUB | 4.20 m
Women's Triple Jump	Yargelis Savigne; CUB | 14.68 m	Yanmei Li; CHN | 14.35 m	Olga Rypakova; KAZ | 14.17 m	Natalya Alekseyeva; RUS | 14.05 m	Athanasia Perra; GRE | DQ (Note: Disqualified after competition due to antidoping rule violation)	Snežana Vukmirovič; SLO | 13.92 m	Mabel Gay; CUB | 13.91 m	Anna Pyatykh; RUS | 13.86 m
Women's Shot Put	Lijiao Gong; CHN | 19.94 m	Jillian Camarena-Williams; USA | 19.35 m	Li Ling; CHN | 19.30 m	Xiangrong Liu; CHN | 18.54 m	Natalya Mikhnevich; BLR | 17.79 m	Michelle Carter; USA | 17.71 m	Jessica Cérival; FRA | 16.90 m	Alena Abramchuk; BLR | 16.82 m
Women's Discus Throw	Yanfeng Li; CHN | 62.73 m	Dani Stevens; AUS | 61.98 m	Aretha D. Thurmond; USA | 60.98 m	Gia Lewis-Smallwood; USA | 60.64 m	Tan Jian; CHN | 60.50 m	Taifeng Sun; CHN | 60.04 m	Żaneta Glanc; POL | 59.68 m	Becky Breisch; USA | 57.05 m

Rome
Event	1st +4 pts	2nd +2 pts	3rd +1 pts	4th ⠀	5th ⠀	6th ⠀	7th ⠀	8th ⠀
Men's 100m (+0.6 m/s)	Usain Bolt; JAM | 9.91	Asafa Powell; JAM | 9.93	Christophe Lemaitre; FRA | 10.00	Kim Collins; SKN | 10.12	Richard Thompson; TTO | 10.13	Rae Monzavous Edwards; USA | 10.20	Mario Forsythe; JAM | 10.21	Lerone Clarke; JAM | 10.31
Men's 800m	Khadevis Robinson; USA | 1:45.09	Mbulaeni Mulaudzi; RSA | 1:45.50	Mohammed Khalaf al Azemi; KUW | DQ	Asbel Kiprop; KEN | 1:46.02	Boaz Kiplagat Lalang; KEN | 1:46.10	David Mutinda Mutua; KEN | 1:46.64	Richard Kiplagat; KEN | 1:46.88	Duane Solomon; USA | 1:47.27
Men's 5000m	Imane Merga; ETH | 12:54.21	Isiah Kiplangat Koech; KEN | 12:54.59	Vincent Kiprop Chepkok; KEN | 12:55.29	Dejen Gebremeskel; ETH | 12:55.89	Sileshi Sihine; ETH | 12:57.86	Mark Kosgei Kiptoo; KEN | 12:59.91	Lucas Kimeli Rotich; KEN | 13:00.02	Abera Kuma; ETH | 13:00.15
Men's 400mH	LJ van Zyl; RSA | 47.91	David Greene; GBR | 48.24	Angelo Taylor; USA | 48.66	Javier Culson; PUR | 48.86	Jehue Gordon; TTO | 49.09	Justin Gaymon; USA | 49.31	Johnny Dutch; USA | 49.43	Rhys Williams; GBR | 49.94
Men's Pole Vault	Renaud Lavillenie; FRA | 5.82 m	Malte Mohr; GER | 5.72 m	Maksym Mazuryk; UKR | 5.62 m	Romain Mesnil; FRA | 5.42 m	Raphael Holzdeppe; GER | 5.42 m	Tim Lobinger; GER | 5.42 m	Jérôme Clavier; FRA | 5.42 m	Derek Miles; USA | 5.42 m
Men's Triple Jump	Phillips Idowu; GBR | 17.59 m	Christian Olsson; SWE | 17.29 m	Alexis Copello; CUB | 17.14 m	Leevan Sands; BAH | 17.13 m	Fabrizio Schembri; ITA | 17.08 m	Benjamin Compaoré; FRA | 16.91 m	Fabrizio Donato; ITA | 16.77 m	Marian Oprea; ROU | 16.70 m
Men's Shot Put	Dylan Armstrong; CAN | 21.60 m	Tomasz Majewski; POL | 21.20 m	Reese Hoffa; USA | 21.13 m	Christian Cantwell; USA | 21.09 m	Ryan Whiting; USA | 20.88 m	Adam Nelson; USA | 20.70 m	Pavel Lyzhyn; BLR | 20.21 m	Cory Martin; USA | 20.04 m
Women's 200m (+0.9 m/s)	Bianca Knight; USA | 22.64	Kerron Stewart; JAM | 22.74	Debbie Ferguson-McKenzie; BAH | 22.76	Allyson Felix; USA | 22.81	Sanya Richards-Ross; USA | 22.88	Charonda Williams; USA | 23.20	LaShauntea Moore; USA | 23.26	Aleksandra Fedoriva-Spayer; RUS | 23.26
Women's 400m	Allyson Felix; USA | 49.81	Amantle Montsho; BOT | 50.47	Francena McCorory; USA | 50.70	Debbie Dunn; USA | 50.79	Sanya Richards-Ross; USA | 50.98	Perri Shakes-Drayton; GBR | 51.47	Shericka Williams; JAM | 51.53	Marta Milani; ITA | 52.75
Women's 1500m	Maryam Yusuf Jamal; BRN | 4:01.60	Meskerem Assefa; ETH | 4:02.12	Gelete Burka; ETH | 4:03.28	Anna Mishchenko; UKR | 4:03.53	Nancy Jebet Langat; KEN | 4:03.66	Christin Wurth-Thomas; USA | 4:03.72	Irene Jelagat; KEN | 4:04.79	Janeth Jepkosgei; KEN | 4:04.87
Women's 100mH (+1.1 m/s)	Dawn Harper-Nelson; USA | 12.70	Kellie Wells; USA | 12.73	Danielle Carruthers; USA | 12.80	Lisa Urech; SUI | 12.84	Christina Vukicevic; NOR | 12.86	Perdita Felicien; CAN | 12.88	Ginnie Crawford; USA | 12.89	Tiffany Porter; GBR | 12.91
Women's 3000mSC	Milcah Chemos; KEN | 9:12.89	Sofia Assefa; ETH | 9:15.04	Habiba Ghribi; TUN | 9:20.33	Birtukan Adamu; ETH | 9:20.37	Lydia Chebet Rotich; KEN | 9:25.16	Hatti Archer; GBR | 9:37.95	Sara Hall; USA | 9:39.48	Bridget Franek; USA | 9:48.24
Women's High Jump	Blanka Vlašić; CRO | 1.95 m	Levern Spencer; LCA | 1.92 m	Mélanie Melfort; FRA | 1.92 m	Vita Styopina; UKR | 1.92 m	Svetlana Shkolina; RUS | 1.92 m	Emma Green; SWE | 1.89 m	Ruth Beitia; ESP | 1.89 m	Nadiya Dusanova; UZB | 1.85 m
Women's Long Jump	Brittney Reese; USA | 6.94 m	Funmi Jimoh; USA | 6.87 m	Éloyse Lesueur-Aymonin; FRA | 6.64 m	Shara Proctor; GBR | 6.62 m	Concepción Montaner; ESP | 6.60 m	Tatyana Kotova; RUS | 6.58 m	Ivana Vuleta; SRB | 6.51 m	Ineta Radēviča; LAT | 6.41 m
Women's Discus Throw	Yarelis Barrios; CUB | 64.18 m	Nadine Müller; GER | 63.17 m	Yanfeng Li; CHN | 62.55 m	Aretha D. Thurmond; USA | 61.68 m	Żaneta Glanc; POL | 59.91 m	Nicoleta Grasu; ROU | 59.63 m	Laura Bordignon; ITA | 55.42 m	Becky Breisch; USA | 53.86 m
Women's Javelin Throw	Mariya Abakumova; RUS | DQ	Christina Obergföll; GER | 63.97 m	Barbora Špotáková; CZE | 63.32 m	Kara Winger; USA | 62.76 m	Martina Ratej; SLO | 60.84 m	Sunette Viljoen; RSA | 60.61 m	Zahra Bani; ITA | 59.28 m	Madara Palameika; LAT | 58.75 m

Eugene
Event	1st +4 pts	2nd +2 pts	3rd +1 pts	4th ⠀	5th ⠀	6th ⠀	7th ⠀	8th ⠀
Men's 200m (+1.1 m/s)	Walter Dix; USA | 20.19	Jaysuma Saidy Ndure; NOR | 20.26	Churandy Martina; NED | 20.39	Rondel Sorrillo; TTO | 20.51	Xavier Carter; USA | 20.55	Emmanuel Callender; TTO | 20.67	Trell Kimmons; USA | 20.71	Leroy Dixon; USA | 20.79
Men's 400m	Angelo Taylor; USA | 45.16	Jeremy Wariner; USA | 45.43	Kévin Borlée; BEL | 45.51	David Neville; USA | 45.70	Michael Bingham; GBR | 45.74	Bershawn Jackson; USA | 45.91	Josh Scott; USA | 46.16	Oscar Pistorius; RSA | 46.33
Men's Mile	Haron Keitany; KEN | 3:49.09	Silas Kiplagat; KEN | 3:49.39	Asbel Kiprop; KEN | 3:49.55	Mekonnen Gebremedhin; ETH | 3:49.70	Caleb Mwangangi Ndiku; KEN | 3:49.77	Daniel Kipchirchir Komen; KEN | 3:50.29	Yenew Alamirew; ETH | 3:50.43	Mohamed Moustaoui; MAR | 3:50.67
Men's 110mH (+1.8 m/s)	David Oliver; USA | 12.94	Xiang Liu; CHN | 13.00	Aries Merritt; USA | 13.18	Andrew Turner; GBR | 13.33	Ashton Eaton; USA | 13.35	Ryan Wilson; USA | 13.41	Dongpeng Shi; CHN | 13.44	Ronnie Ash; USA | 13.49
Men's 3000mSC	Ezekiel Kemboi; KEN | 8:08.34	Paul Kipsiele Koech; KEN | 8:10.13	Roba Gari; ETH | 8:11.34	Ruben Ramolefi; RSA | 8:24.95	Daniel Huling; USA | 8:25.95	Kyle Alcorn; USA | 8:26.88	Billy Nelson; USA | 8:28.67	Ben Bruce; USA | 8:37.27
Men's High Jump	Raul Spank; GER | 2.32 m	Andrey Silnov; RUS | 2.32 m	Jesse Williams; USA | 2.32 m	Dusty Jonas; USA | 2.29 m	Mutaz Essa Barshim; QAT | 2.29 m	Ivan Ukhov; RUS | 2.29 m	Kyriakos Ioannou; CYP | 2.26 m	Donald Thomas; BAH | 2.21 m
Men's Long Jump	Greg Rutherford; GBR | 8.32 m	Godfrey Khotso Mokoena; RSA | 8.31 m	Sebastian Bayer; GER | 8.03 m	Tyrone Smith; BER | 8.00 m	Fabrice Lapierre; AUS | 7.94 m	Ashton Eaton; USA | 7.93 m	Jeremy Hicks; USA | 7.78 m	Godfrey Khotso Mokoena; RSA | 8.19 m
Men's Discus Throw	Robert Harting; GER | 68.40 m	Virgilijus Alekna; LTU | 67.19 m	Piotr Małachowski; POL | 65.95 m	Gerd Kanter; EST | 65.51 m	Jason Young; USA | 63.20 m	Ian Waltz; USA | 62.32 m	Zoltán Kővágó; HUN | 61.67 m	Casey Malone; USA | 60.37 m
Women's 100m (+2.0 m/s)	Carmelita Jeter; USA | 10.70	Marshevet Hooker; USA | 10.86	Kerron Stewart; JAM | 10.87	Shelly-Ann Fraser-Pryce; JAM | 10.95	Sherone Simpson; JAM | 11.00	Alexandria Anderson; USA | 11.02	Blessing Okagbare; NGR | 11.08	Lauryn Williams; USA | 11.15
Women's 800m	Kenia Sinclair; JAM | 1:58.29	Caster Semenya; RSA | 1:58.88	Janeth Jepkosgei; KEN | 1:59.15	Alysia Montaño; USA | 1:59.40	Yuliya Stepanova; RUS | DQ	Geena Gall; USA | 1:59.76	Phoebe Wright; USA | 2:00.05	Anna Willard; USA | 2:00.19
Women's 5000m	Vivian Jepkemei Cheruiyot; KEN | 14:33.96	Linet Chepkwemoi Masai; KEN | 14:35.44	Mercy Cherono; KEN | 14:37.01	Sally Kipyego; KEN | 14:39.71	Pauline Chemning Korikwiang; KEN | 14:47.71	Shalane Flanagan; USA | 14:49.68	Wude Ayalew; ETH | 14:59.71	Esther Chemtai; KEN | 15:00.08
Women's 400mH	Lashinda Demus; USA | 53.31	Kaliese Carter; JAM | 53.45	Melaine Walker; JAM | 53.56	Zuzana Hejnová; CZE | 54.26	Perri Shakes-Drayton; GBR | 55.36	Ajoke Odumosu; NGR | 56.36	Sheena Johnson-Tosta; USA | 57.42	Josanne Lucas; TTO | 57.76
Women's Pole Vault	Anna Rogowska; POL | 4.68 m	Svetlana Feofanova; RUS | 4.58 m	Fabiana Murer; BRA | 4.48 m	Lacy Janson; USA | 4.38 m	Carolin Hingst; GER | 4.38 m	Kylie Hutson; USA | 4.38 m	Becky Holliday Ward; USA | 4.28 m	Mary Saxer; USA | 4.28 m
Women's Triple Jump	Olha Saladukha; UKR | 14.98 m	Blessing Ufodiama; USA | 14.06 m	Anna Pyatykh; RUS | 13.98 m	Nadezhda Alyokhina; RUS | 13.94 m	Anastasiya Potapova; RUS | 13.78 m	Shakeema Walker-Welsch; USA | 13.72 m	Toni Smith; USA | 13.62 m	Yekaterina Kayukova-Chernenko; RUS | 13.44 m
Women's Shot Put	Nadezhda Ostapchuk; BLR | DQ	Jillian Camarena-Williams; USA | 19.76 m	Cleopatra Borel; TTO | 18.85 m	Anna Avdeyeva; RUS | 18.78 m	Natalya Mikhnevich; BLR | 18.48 m	Michelle Carter; USA | 18.43 m	Sarah Stevens-Walker; USA | 17.80 m	
Women's Javelin Throw	Christina Obergföll; GER | 65.48 m	Mariya Abakumova; RUS | DQ	Barbora Špotáková; CZE | 64.87 m	Martina Ratej; SLO | 61.16 m	Sunette Viljoen; RSA | 60.09 m	Kara Winger; USA | 58.39 m	Rachel Buciarski; USA | 56.39 m	Madara Palameika; LAT | 54.98 m

Oslo
Event	1st +4 pts	2nd +2 pts	3rd +1 pts	4th ⠀	5th ⠀	6th ⠀	7th ⠀	8th ⠀
Men's 200m (+0.7 m/s)	Usain Bolt; JAM | 19.86	Jaysuma Saidy Ndure; NOR | 20.43	Mario Forsythe; JAM | 20.49	Kim Collins; SKN | 20.56	Christian Malcolm; GBR | 20.57	Sebastian Ernst; GER | 20.70	Patrick van Luijk; NED | 20.73	Brian Dzingai; ZIM | 20.88
Men's Mile	Asbel Kiprop; KEN | 3:50.86	Haron Keitany; KEN | 3:51.02	Mekonnen Gebremedhin; ETH | 3:51.30	Mohammed Shaween; KSA | 3:52.00	Jeffrey Riseley; AUS | 3:52.53	Nixon Kiplimo Chepseba; KEN | 3:53.36	Augustine Kiprono Choge; KEN | 3:53.81	Andrew Baddeley; GBR | 3:54.29
Men's 110mH (+0.1 m/s)	Aries Merritt; USA | 13.12	Dwight Thomas; JAM | 13.15	Joel Brown; USA | 13.20	Andrew Turner; GBR | 13.32	Tyron Akins; USA | 13.34	Ryan Wilson; USA | 13.36	Dominic Berger; USA | 13.39	Jason Richardson; USA | 13.78
Men's 3000mSC	Paul Kipsiele Koech; KEN | 8:01.83	Brimin Kiprop Kipruto; KEN | 8:05.40	Roba Gari; ETH | 8:10.41	Mahiedine Mekhissi; FRA | 8:14.38	Tarik Langat Akdag; KEN | 8:16.17	Hilal Yego; KEN | 8:20.75	Benjamin Kiplagat; UGA | 8:21.76	Bjørnar Ustad Kristensen; NOR | 8:23.19
Men's High Jump	Kyriakos Ioannou; CYP | 2.28 m	Andrey Silnov; RUS | 2.28 m	Raul Spank; GER | 2.28 m	Jaroslav Bába; CZE | 2.24 m	Jesse Williams; USA | 2.24 m	Osku Torro; FIN | 2.24 m	Donald Thomas; BAH | 2.24 m	Aleksandr Shustov; RUS | 2.24 m
Men's Long Jump	Godfrey Khotso Mokoena; RSA | 8.08 m	Morten Jensen; DEN | 8.01 m	Louis Tsatoumas; GRE | 7.96 m	Michel Tornéus; SWE | 7.95 m	Ignisious Gaisah; GHA | 7.93 m	Greg Rutherford; GBR | 7.89 m	Chris Tomlinson; GBR | 7.87 m	Fabrice Lapierre; AUS | 7.74 m
Men's Discus Throw	Gerd Kanter; EST | 65.14 m	Frank Casanas; ESP | 64.54 m	Virgilijus Alekna; LTU | 64.00 m	Märt Israel; EST | 63.30 m	Zoltán Kővágó; HUN | 62.81 m	Niklas Arrhenius; SWE | 62.03 m	Erik Cadée; NED | 61.84 m	Martin Wierig; GER | 61.16 m
Men's Javelin Throw	Matthias de Zordo; GER | 83.94 m	Robert Oosthuizen; RSA | 82.07 m	Petr Frydrych; CZE | 81.09 m	Vadims Vasiļevskis; LAT | 80.50 m	Tero Pitkämäki; FIN | 80.22 m	Oleksandr Pyatnytsya; UKR | 79.55 m	Ari Mannio; FIN | 79.51 m	Till Wöschler; GER | 78.72 m
Women's 100m (+2.2 m/s)	Ivet Lalova-Collio; BUL | 11.01	Olesya Povh; UKR | 11.14	Ezinne Okparaebo; NOR | 11.17	Mariya Ryemyen; UKR | 11.18	Ruddy Zang Milama; GAB | 11.19	Stephanie Durst; USA | 11.33	Verena Sailer; GER | 11.46	Georgia Kokloni; GRE | DQ
Women's 400m	Amantle Montsho; BOT | 50.10	Denisa Rosolová; CZE | 51.04	Novlene Williams-Mills; JAM | 51.17	Kseniya Zadorina; RUS | 51.26	Antonina Krivoshapka; RUS | 51.36	Tatyana Firova; RUS | DQ	Janin Lindenberg; GER | 52.82	Anna Ryzhykova; UKR | 53.31
Women's 800m	Halima Hachlaf; MAR | 1:58.27	Mariya Savinova; RUS | DQ	Caster Semenya; RSA | 1:58.61	Janeth Jepkosgei; KEN | 1:59.05	Jennifer Meadows; GBR | 1:59.27	Lucia Hrivnák Klocová; SVK | 1:59.92	Yuliya Stepanova; RUS | DQ	Yvonne Hak; NED | 2:00.30
Women's 5000m	Meseret Defar; ETH | 14:37.32	Sentayehu Ejigu; ETH | 14:37.50	Genzebe Dibaba; ETH | 14:37.56	Meselech Melkamu; ETH | 14:39.44	Emebet Anteneh; ETH | 14:43.29	Priscah Jepleting Cherono; KEN | 14:43.30	Dolores Checa; ESP | 14:46.30	Hiwot Ayalew; ETH | 14:49.36
Women's 400mH	Zuzana Hejnová; CZE | 54.38	Perri Shakes-Drayton; GBR | 54.77	Natalya Antyukh; RUS | 55.45	Queen Claye; USA | 55.87	Nickiesha Wilson; JAM | 56.01	Nicole Leach; USA | 56.08	Christine Spence; USA | 56.12	Josanne Lucas; TTO | 57.08
Women's Pole Vault	Fabiana Murer; BRA | 4.60 m	Aleksandra Kiryashova; RUS | 4.50 m	Anna Rogowska; POL | 4.40 m	Monika Pyrek; POL | 4.30 m	Carolin Hingst; GER | NH m	Minna Nikkanen; FIN | NH m	Cathrine Larsåsen; NOR | NH m	
Women's Triple Jump	Yargelis Savigne; CUB | 14.81 m	Olha Saladukha; UKR | 14.71 m	Mabel Gay; CUB | 14.31 m	Katja Demut; GER | 14.17 m	Olga Rypakova; KAZ | 14.04 m	Anna Pyatykh; RUS | 13.93 m	Nadezhda Alyokhina; RUS | 13.93 m	Khaddi Sagnia; SWE | 12.84 m
Women's Shot Put	Valerie Adams; NZL | 20.26 m	Nadezhda Ostapchuk; BLR | DQ	Lijiao Gong; CHN | 19.57 m	Jillian Camarena-Williams; USA | 19.14 m	Nadine Kleinert; GER | 18.50 m	Xiangrong Liu; CHN | 18.08 m	Helena Engman; SWE | 16.91 m	Kristin Sundsteigen; NOR | 13.97 m

New
Event	1st ⠀	2nd ⠀	3rd ⠀	4th ⠀	5th ⠀	6th ⠀	7th ⠀	8th ⠀
Men's 100m (-3.4 m/s)	Steve Mullings; JAM | 10.26	Tyson Gay; USA | 10.26	Keston Bledman; TTO | 10.33	Nickel Ashmeade; JAM | 10.36	Michael Rodgers; USA | 10.38	Trell Kimmons; USA | 10.51	Rae Monzavous Edwards; USA | DQ	Richard Thompson; TTO | DQ
Men's 400m	Jeremy Wariner; USA | 45.13	Jermaine Gonzales; JAM | 45.16	Rondell Bartholomew; GRN | 45.17	Christopher Brown; BAH | 45.50	Oscar Pistorius; RSA | 45.69	Kévin Borlée; BEL | 45.86	Renny Quow; TTO | 46.39	Ricardo Chambers; JAM | 46.74
Men's 800m	Alfred Kirwa Yego; KEN | 1:46.57	Mbulaeni Mulaudzi; RSA | 1:46.68	Boaz Kiplagat Lalang; KEN | 1:46.75	Lachlan Renshaw; AUS | 1:47.33	Bram Som; NED | 1:47.34	Karjuan Williams; USA | 1:47.59	Rob Novak; USA | 1:47.67	Matthew Scherer; USA | DNF
Men's 5000m	Dejen Gebremeskel; ETH | 13:05.22	Bernard Lagat; USA | 13:05.46	Tariku Bekele; ETH | 13:06.06	Isiah Kiplangat Koech; KEN | 13:07.22	Juan Luis Barrios; MEX | 13:09.81	Edwin Cheruiyot Soi; KEN | 13:11.75	Kaan Kigen Özbilen; KEN | 13:12.07	Alistair Ian Cragg; IRL | 13:12.21
Men's 400mH	Javier Culson; PUR | 48.50	Bershawn Jackson; USA | 48.55	David Greene; GBR | 49.07	LJ van Zyl; RSA | 49.09	Justin Gaymon; USA | 49.24	Michael Tinsley; USA | 49.46	Jehue Gordon; TTO | 49.79	Johnny Dutch; USA | 50.24
Men's Pole Vault	Romain Mesnil; FRA | 5.52 m	Brad Walker; USA | 5.52 m	Jérôme Clavier; FRA | 5.42 m	Damiel Dossevi; FRA | 5.42 m	Derek Miles; USA | 5.22 m	Fabian Schulze; GER | 5.22 m	Jeremy Scott; USA | 5.22 m	Alhaji Jeng; SWE | NH m
Men's Triple Jump	Phillips Idowu; GBR | 16.67 m	Christian Olsson; SWE | 16.29 m	Leevan Sands; BAH | 16.28 m	Marian Oprea; ROU | 16.22 m	Walter Davis; USA | 16.09 m	Tosin Oke; NGR | 15.90 m	Teddy Tamgho; FRA | 15.55 m	Kenta Bell; USA | 15.02 m
Women's 200m (-2.8 m/s)	Allyson Felix; USA | 22.92	Bianca Knight; USA | 22.96	Shalonda Solomon; USA | 23.03	Carmelita Jeter; USA | 23.15	Debbie Ferguson-McKenzie; BAH | 23.25	Charonda Williams; USA | 23.45	Shelly-Ann Fraser-Pryce; JAM | 23.52	
Women's 1500m	Kenia Sinclair; JAM | 4:08.06	Morgan Uceny; USA | 4:08.42	Kalkidan Gezahegne; ETH | 4:08.46	Gelete Burka; ETH | 4:09.84	Anna Willard; USA | 4:10.38	Treniere Moser; USA | 4:10.40	Malindi Elmore; CAN | 4:10.48	Brianna Felnagle; USA | 4:11.85
Women's 100mH (-3.7 m/s)	Danielle Carruthers; USA | 13.04	Kellie Wells; USA | 13.06	Tiffany Porter; GBR | 13.11	Lolo Jones; USA | 13.22	Ginnie Crawford; USA | 13.23	Perdita Felicien; CAN | 13.27	Jessica Ennis-Hill; GBR | 13.27	Delloreen Ennis; JAM | 15.32
Women's 3000mSC	Milcah Chemos; KEN | 9:27.29	Sofia Assefa; ETH | 9:27.37	Gulnara Galkina; RUS | 9:29.75	Lydia Chebet Rotich; KEN | 9:35.19	Fionnuala McCormack; IRL | 9:37.60	Bridget Franek; USA | 9:38.92	Stephanie Reilly; IRL | 9:42.91	Beverly Ramos; PUR | 9:45.78
Women's High Jump	Emma Green; SWE | 1.94 m	Blanka Vlašić; CRO | 1.90 m	Sheree Ruff; JAM | 1.82 m	Mélanie Melfort; FRA | 1.82 m	Levern Spencer; LCA | 1.82 m	Becky Christensen; USA | 1.77 m	Sheena Gordon; USA | 1.77 m	Elizabeth Patterson; USA | 1.70 m
Women's Long Jump	Funmi Jimoh; USA | 6.48 m	Janay Deloach; USA | 6.41 m	Brittney Reese; USA | 6.35 m	Viktoriya Rybalko; UKR | 6.33 m	Brianna Glenn; USA | 6.29 m	Jovanee Jarrett; JAM | 6.18 m	Tianna Madison; USA | 6.18 m	Jessica Ennis-Hill; GBR | 6.03 m
Women's Discus Throw	Stephanie Brown-Trafton; USA | 62.94 m	Gia Lewis-Smallwood; USA | 59.89 m	Aretha D. Thurmond; USA | 59.38 m	Joanna Wiśniewska; POL | 58.73 m	Żaneta Glanc; POL | 57.97 m	Suzy Powell-Roos; USA | 57.69 m	Summer Pierson; USA | 55.13 m	Becky Breisch; USA | NM m
Women's Javelin Throw	Christina Obergföll; GER | 64.43 m	Sunette Viljoen; RSA | 60.39 m	Rachel Buciarski; USA | 58.43 m	Jarmila Jurkovičová; CZE | 57.17 m	Alicia Deshasier; USA | 55.70 m	Kara Winger; USA | 54.62 m		

Lausanne
Event	1st +4 pts	2nd +2 pts	3rd +1 pts	4th ⠀	5th ⠀	6th ⠀	7th ⠀	8th ⠀
Men's 100m (+1.0 m/s)	Asafa Powell; JAM | 9.78	Michael Frater; JAM | 9.88	Christophe Lemaitre; FRA | 9.95	Nesta Carter; JAM | 9.99	Jaysuma Saidy Ndure; NOR | 9.99	Churandy Martina; NED | 10.21	Felix Göltl; GER | 10.49	Pascal Mancini; SUI | 10.58
Men's 800m	David Rudisha; KEN | 1:44.15	Marcin Lewandowski; POL | 1:45.01	Amine Laalou; MAR | 1:45.11	Jackson Mumbwa Kivuva; KEN | 1:45.45	Alfred Kirwa Yego; KEN | 1:46.49	Richard Kiplagat; KEN | 1:47.43	Bram Som; NED | 1:47.70	Mbulaeni Mulaudzi; RSA | 1:48.44
Men's 5000m	Vincent Kiprop Chepkok; KEN | 12:59.13	Imane Merga; ETH | 12:59.47	Eliud Kipchoge; KEN | 12:59.71	Chesari Kirui Jacob; KEN | 13:03.73	Dejen Gebremeskel; ETH | 13:05.52	Abera Kuma; ETH | 13:07.27	Mark Kosgei Kiptoo; KEN | 13:10.96	Tariku Bekele; ETH | 13:17.74
Men's 400mH	David Greene; GBR | 48.41	Javier Culson; PUR | 48.73	Justin Gaymon; USA | 49.21	Jack Green; GBR | 49.44	Kerron Clement; USA | 49.79	Félix Sánchez; DOM | 50.28	Cornel Fredericks; RSA | 51.12	Kurt Leone Couto; MOZ | 51.55
Men's Pole Vault	Renaud Lavillenie; FRA | 5.83 m	Malte Mohr; GER | 5.73 m	Lázaro Borges; CUB | 5.63 m	Raphael Holzdeppe; GER | 5.53 m	Fabian Schulze; GER | 5.43 m	Damiel Dossevi; FRA | 5.43 m	Igor Pavlov; RUS | 5.43 m	Giuseppe Gibilisco; ITA | NH m
Men's Triple Jump	Teddy Tamgho; FRA | 17.91 m	Phillips Idowu; GBR | 17.52 m	Alexis Copello; CUB | 17.06 m	Marian Oprea; ROU | 17.00 m	David Girat; CUB | 16.97 m	Christian Olsson; SWE | 16.86 m	Leevan Sands; BAH | 16.83 m	Benjamin Compaoré; FRA | 16.82 m
Men's Shot Put	Christian Cantwell; USA | 21.83 m	Ryan Whiting; USA | 21.76 m	Tomasz Majewski; POL | 21.55 m	Reese Hoffa; USA | 21.19 m	Andrei Mikhnevich; BLR | DQ	Māris Urtāns; LAT | 20.24 m	Adam Nelson; USA | DNS m	
Men's Javelin Throw	Andreas Thorkildsen; NOR | 88.19 m	Sergey Makarov; RUS | 87.12 m	Matthias de Zordo; GER | 83.65 m	Vítězslav Veselý; CZE | 82.03 m	Petr Frydrych; CZE | 78.94 m	Tero Pitkämäki; FIN | 78.35 m	Vadims Vasiļevskis; LAT | 76.27 m	
Women's 200m (+0.2 m/s)	Mariya Ryemyen; UKR | 22.85	Debbie Ferguson-McKenzie; BAH | 22.93	Olesya Povh; UKR | 23.04	Cydonie Mothersill; CAY | 23.08	LaShauntea Moore; USA | 23.16	Myriam Soumaré; FRA | 23.19	Yuliya Gushchina; RUS | 23.23	Natalia Pohrebniak; UKR | 23.56
Women's 400m	Amantle Montsho; BOT | 50.23	Sanya Richards-Ross; USA | 50.61	Natasha Hastings; USA | 51.07	Antonina Yefremova; UKR | 51.12	Debbie Dunn; USA | 51.63	Novlene Williams-Mills; JAM | 51.73	Shericka Williams; JAM | 51.86	Kaliese Carter; JAM | DNS
Women's 1500m	Morgan Uceny; USA | 4:05.52	Anna Mishchenko; UKR | 4:06.00	Hind Dehiba Chahyd; FRA | 4:06.58	Viola Jelagat Kibiwot; KEN | 4:06.67	Kalkidan Gezahegne; ETH | 4:06.87	Janeth Jepkosgei; KEN | 4:07.00	Irene Jelagat; KEN | 4:08.22	Meskerem Assefa; ETH | 4:08.75
Women's 100mH (+3.3 m/s)	Sally Pearson; AUS | 12.47	Danielle Carruthers; USA | 12.48	Tiffany Porter; GBR | 12.64	Ginnie Crawford; USA | 12.65	Lisa Urech; SUI | 12.72	Kellie Wells; USA | 12.76	Derval O'Rourke; IRL | 12.98	Delloreen Ennis; JAM | 13.58
Women's 3000mSC	Milcah Chemos; KEN | 9:19.87	Sofia Assefa; ETH | 9:20.50	Mercy Wanjiku Njoroge; KEN | 9:20.51	Habiba Ghribi; TUN | 9:21.02	Birtukan Adamu; ETH | 9:26.31	Birtukan Fente Alemu; ETH | 9:28.27	Lydia Chebet Rotich; KEN | 9:35.83	Fionnuala McCormack; IRL | 9:38.88
Women's High Jump	Anna Chicherova; RUS | 1.95 m	Svetlana Shkolina; RUS | 1.90 m	Vita Styopina; UKR | 1.90 m	Mélanie Melfort; FRA | 1.90 m	Emma Green; SWE | 1.90 m	Blanka Vlašić; CRO | 1.90 m	Irina Gordeyeva; RUS | 1.85 m	Beatrice Lundmark; SUI | 1.85 m
Women's Long Jump	Brittney Reese; USA | 6.85 m	Darya Klishina; RUS | 6.76 m	Shara Proctor; GBR | 6.66 m	Funmi Jimoh; USA | 6.66 m	Janay Deloach; USA | 6.60 m	Ineta Radēviča; LAT | 6.56 m	Veronika Shutkova; BLR | 6.55 m	Concepción Montaner; ESP | 6.27 m
Women's Discus Throw	Yarelis Barrios; CUB | 64.29 m	Aretha D. Thurmond; USA | 63.85 m	Nadine Müller; GER | 63.58 m	Stephanie Brown-Trafton; USA | 61.94 m	Kateryna Karsak; UKR | 60.99 m	Nicoleta Grasu; ROU | 60.54 m	Melina Robert-Michon; FRA | 59.37 m	Yarisley Collado; CUB | 58.88 m

Paris
Event	1st +4 pts	2nd +2 pts	3rd +1 pts	4th ⠀	5th ⠀	6th ⠀	7th ⠀	8th ⠀
Men's 200m (-0.6 m/s)	Usain Bolt; JAM | 20.03	Christophe Lemaitre; FRA | 20.21	Darvis Patton; USA | 20.59	Mario Forsythe; JAM | 20.61	Rondel Sorrillo; TTO | 20.81	Teddy Tinmar; FRA | 21.15	Shawn Crawford; USA | 22.17	Alonso Edward; PAN | DNS
Men's 400m	Christopher Brown; BAH | 44.94	Jonathan Borlée; BEL | 45.05	Jermaine Gonzales; JAM | 45.43	Jeremy Wariner; USA | 45.50	Oscar Pistorius; RSA | 45.84	Michael Bingham; GBR | 45.84	Calvin Smith; USA | 45.88	Yoann Décimus; FRA | 46.88
Men's 1500m	Amine Laalou; MAR | 3:32.15	Asbel Kiprop; KEN | 3:33.04	Bernard Lagat; USA | 3:33.11	Nick Willis; NZL | 3:33.22	Mohamed Moustaoui; MAR | 3:33.59	Leonel Manzano; USA | 3:33.66	Yoann Kowal; FRA | 3:33.75	Deresse Mekonnen; ETH | 3:33.84
Men's 110mH (+1.3 m/s)	Dayron Robles; CUB | 13.09	David Oliver; USA | 13.09	Dwight Thomas; JAM | 13.18	Aries Merritt; USA | 13.27	Jason Richardson; USA | 13.31	Andrew Turner; GBR | 13.43	Terrence Trammell; USA | 13.57	Garfield Darien; FRA | DNS
Men's 3000mSC	Mahiedine Mekhissi; FRA | 8:02.09	Ezekiel Kemboi; KEN | 8:07.14	Benjamin Kiplagat; UGA | 8:08.43	Roba Gari; ETH | 8:10.03	Jairus Kipchoge Birech; KEN | 8:11.31	Tarik Langat Akdag; KEN | 8:13.14	Ruben Ramolefi; RSA | 8:14.36	Łukasz Parszczyński; POL | 8:15.47
Men's Pole Vault	Renaud Lavillenie; FRA | 5.73 m	Jérôme Clavier; FRA | 5.63 m	Konstantinos Filippidis; GRE | 5.63 m	Raphael Holzdeppe; GER | 5.53 m	Romain Mesnil; FRA | 5.53 m	Malte Mohr; GER | 5.53 m	Fabian Schulze; GER | 5.53 m	Alexander Straub; GER | 5.33 m
Men's Long Jump	Irving Saladino; PAN | 8.40 m	Chris Tomlinson; GBR | 8.35 m	Greg Rutherford; GBR | 8.27 m	Godfrey Khotso Mokoena; RSA | 8.25 m	Yahya Berrabah; MAR | 8.10 m	Louis Tsatoumas; GRE | 8.03 m	Christian Reif; GER | 7.99 m	Fabrice Lapierre; AUS | 7.97 m
Men's Discus Throw	Robert Harting; GER | 67.32 m	Piotr Małachowski; POL | 67.26 m	Gerd Kanter; EST | 67.24 m	Zoltán Kővágó; HUN | 65.26 m	Benn Harradine; AUS | 64.98 m	Martin Wierig; GER | 64.20 m	Virgilijus Alekna; LTU | 63.74 m	Märt Israel; EST | 60.33 m
Women's 100m (+0.6 m/s)	Kelly-Ann Baptiste; TTO | 10.91	Veronica Campbell-Brown; JAM | 10.95	Kerron Stewart; JAM | 11.04	Ivet Lalova-Collio; BUL | 11.18	Shalonda Solomon; USA | 11.19	Sherone Simpson; JAM | 11.33	Véronique Mang; FRA | 11.33	Myriam Soumaré; FRA | 11.36
Women's 800m	Caster Semenya; RSA | 2:00.18	Halima Hachlaf; MAR | 2:00.60	Jennifer Meadows; GBR | 2:00.74	Alysia Montaño; USA | 2:00.78	Hind Dehiba Chahyd; FRA | 2:01.45	Zahra Bouras; ALG | 2:01.73	Svetlana Usovich; BLR | 2:01.78	Yuneysi Santiusti; CUB | 2:02.55
Women's 5000m	Meseret Defar; ETH | 14:29.52	Sentayehu Ejigu; ETH | 14:31.66	Mercy Cherono; KEN | 14:35.13	Shalane Flanagan; USA | 14:45.20	Dolores Checa; ESP | 14:46.89	Sule Utura; ETH | 14:56.05	Hiwot Ayalew; ETH | 14:57.62	Emebet Anteneh; ETH | 14:57.66
Women's 400mH	Zuzana Hejnová; CZE | 53.29	Kaliese Carter; JAM | 53.45	Natalya Antyukh; RUS | 54.41	Perri Shakes-Drayton; GBR | 54.79	Melaine Walker; JAM | 55.06	Vanya Stambolova; BUL | 55.51	Ristananna Tracey; JAM | 56.32	Phara Anacharsis; FRA | 56.53
Women's Triple Jump	Yargelis Savigne; CUB | 14.99 m	Olha Saladukha; UKR | 14.81 m	Olga Rypakova; KAZ | 14.48 m	Simona la Mantia; ITA | 14.33 m	Mabel Gay; CUB | 14.31 m	Dana Velďáková; SVK | 14.25 m	Katja Demut; GER | 14.06 m	Baya Rahouli; ALG | 13.97 m
Women's Shot Put	Valerie Adams; NZL | 20.78 m	Nadezhda Ostapchuk; BLR | DQ	Jillian Camarena-Williams; USA | 20.18 m	Cleopatra Borel; TTO | 19.42 m	Misleydis González; CUB | 18.87 m	Michelle Carter; USA | 18.38 m	Nadine Kleinert; GER | 18.01 m	Jessica Cérival; FRA | 17.12 m
Women's Javelin Throw	Christina Obergföll; GER | 68.01 m	Barbora Špotáková; CZE | 67.57 m	Mariya Abakumova; RUS | DQ	Goldie Sayers; GBR | 62.14 m	Kimberley Mickle; AUS | 61.97 m	Sunette Viljoen; RSA | 61.74 m	Katharina Molitor; GER | 61.74 m	Kara Winger; USA | 58.21 m

Birmingham
Event	1st +4 pts	2nd +2 pts	3rd +1 pts	4th ⠀	5th ⠀	6th ⠀	7th ⠀	8th ⠀
Men's 100m (+0.4 m/s)	Asafa Powell; JAM | 9.91	Nesta Carter; JAM | 9.93	Michael Frater; JAM | 10.01	Richard Thompson; TTO | 10.05	Keston Bledman; TTO | 10.22	Marlon Devonish; GBR | 10.25	Jaysuma Saidy Ndure; NOR | DQ	Michael Rodgers; USA | DNS
Men's 800m	Abubaker Kaki; SUD | 1:44.54	Marcin Lewandowski; POL | 1:45.47	Amine Laalou; MAR | 1:45.77	Mukhtar Mohammed; GBR | 1:46.66	James Shane; GBR | 1:46.70	Nick Willis; NZL | 1:46.89	Michael Rimmer; GBR | 1:47.14	Gareth Warburton; GBR | 1:47.19
Men's 5000m	Mo Farah; GBR | 13:06.14	Galen Rupp; USA | 13:06.86	Imane Merga; ETH | 13:07.63	Yenew Alamirew; ETH | 13:08.78	Jesús España; ESP | 13:10.19	Craig Mottram; AUS | 13:11.51	Abera Kuma; ETH | 13:12.36	Collis Birmingham; AUS | 13:15.70
Men's 400mH	David Greene; GBR | 48.20	Bershawn Jackson; USA | 48.22	Javier Culson; PUR | 48.34	Jack Green; GBR | 48.98	Jehue Gordon; TTO | 49.21	Michael Tinsley; USA | 49.44	Félix Sánchez; DOM | 49.59	Johnny Dutch; USA | 50.18
Men's Triple Jump	Phillips Idowu; GBR | 17.54 m	Alexis Copello; CUB | 17.12 m	David Girat; CUB | 17.08 m	Leevan Sands; BAH | 16.96 m	Teddy Tamgho; FRA | 16.74 m	Fabrizio Schembri; ITA | 16.40 m	Marian Oprea; ROU | 16.11 m	Nkosinza Balumbu; USA | 16.06 m
Men's Shot Put	Dylan Armstrong; CAN | 21.55 m	Tomasz Majewski; POL | 20.90 m	Christian Cantwell; USA | 20.86 m	Ryan Whiting; USA | 20.55 m	Marco Fortes; POR | 20.42 m	Adam Nelson; USA | 20.15 m	Reese Hoffa; USA | 20.09 m	Dan Taylor; USA | 19.77 m
Men's Javelin Throw	Andreas Thorkildsen; NOR | 88.30 m	Matthias de Zordo; GER | 83.42 m	Jarrod Bannister; AUS | 82.01 m	Stuart Farquhar; NZL | 81.47 m	Robert Oosthuizen; RSA | 78.55 m	Ari Mannio; FIN | 78.43 m	James Campbell; GBR | 75.96 m	Petr Frydrych; CZE | 67.91 m
Women's 200m (+1.0 m/s)	Bianca Knight; USA | 22.59	Marshevet Hooker; USA | 22.59	Carmelita Jeter; USA | 22.62	Alexandria Anderson; USA | 22.87	Debbie Ferguson-McKenzie; BAH | 22.93	Ivet Lalova-Collio; BUL | 23.00	Anyika Onuora; GBR | 23.06	Natasha Hastings; USA | 23.11
Women's 400m	Amantle Montsho; BOT | 50.20	Rose-Marie Whyte-Robinson; JAM | 50.82	Novlene Williams-Mills; JAM | 50.85	Sanya Richards-Ross; USA | 51.11	Debbie Dunn; USA | 51.28	Francena McCorory; USA | 51.46	Denisa Rosolová; CZE | 51.61	Shana Cox; GBR | 51.63
Women's 1500m	Morgan Uceny; USA | 4:05.64	Kalkidan Gezahegne; ETH | 4:05.96	Maryam Yusuf Jamal; BRN | 4:06.39	Helen Clitheroe; GBR | 4:06.49	Stacey Smith; GBR | 4:06.81	Ingvill Måkestad Bovim; NOR | 4:06.82	Hannah England; GBR | 4:07.79	Christin Wurth-Thomas; USA | 4:08.10
Women's 100mH (+0.7 m/s)	Sally Pearson; AUS | 12.48	Danielle Carruthers; USA | 12.52	Ginnie Crawford; USA | 12.79	Kellie Wells; USA | 12.80	Kristi Castlin; USA | 12.91	Tiffany Porter; GBR | 12.93	Christina Vukicevic; NOR | 12.95	Loreal Smith; USA | 13.06
Women's 3000mSC	Sofia Assefa; ETH | 9:25.87	Almaz Ayana; ETH | 9:30.27	Fionnuala McCormack; IRL | 9:37.93	Barbara Parker; GBR | 9:37.95	Delilah DiCrescenzo; USA | 9:40.63	Hanane Ouhaddou; MAR | DQ	Birtukan Adamu; ETH | 9:41.95	Sophie Duarte; FRA | 9:44.18
Women's High Jump	Blanka Vlašić; CRO | 1.99 m	Anna Chicherova; RUS | 1.99 m	Emma Green; SWE | 1.90 m	Mélanie Melfort; FRA | 1.87 m	Levern Spencer; LCA | 1.83 m	Ebba Jungmark; SWE | 1.83 m	Elizabeth Patterson; USA | 1.83 m	Beatrice Lundmark; SUI | 1.83 m
Women's Pole Vault	Silke Spiegelburg; GER | 4.66 m	Holly Bradshaw; GBR | 4.61 m	Fabiana Murer; BRA | 4.46 m	Svetlana Feofanova; RUS | 4.46 m	Kristina Gadschiew; GER | 4.46 m	Kylie Hutson; USA | 4.46 m	Kate Dennison; GBR | 4.31 m	Jiřina Ptáčníková; CZE | NH m
Women's Long Jump	Janay Deloach; USA | 6.78 m	Brittney Reese; USA | 6.67 m	Darya Klishina; RUS | 6.64 m	Naide Gomes; POR | 6.58 m	Funmi Jimoh; USA | 6.55 m	Blessing Okagbare; NGR | 6.42 m	Shara Proctor; GBR | 6.42 m	Brianna Glenn; USA | 6.40 m
Women's Discus Throw	Nadine Müller; GER | 65.75 m	Aretha D. Thurmond; USA | 62.65 m	Dani Stevens; AUS | 62.33 m	Nicoleta Grasu; ROU | 61.18 m	Stephanie Brown-Trafton; USA | 60.25 m	Joanna Wiśniewska; POL | 59.60 m	Jade Lally; GBR | 58.64 m	Melina Robert-Michon; FRA | 57.80 m

Monaco
Event	1st +4 pts	2nd +2 pts	3rd +1 pts	4th ⠀	5th ⠀	6th ⠀	7th ⠀	8th ⠀
Men's 100m (+1.0 m/s)	Usain Bolt; JAM | 9.88	Nesta Carter; JAM | 9.90	Michael Rodgers; USA | DQ	Michael Frater; JAM | 10.01	Christophe Lemaitre; FRA | 10.03	Jaysuma Saidy Ndure; NOR | 10.07	Francis Obikwelu; POR | 10.21	Churandy Martina; NED | 10.24
Men's 800m	David Rudisha; KEN | 1:42.61	Asbel Kiprop; KEN | 1:43.15	Nick Symmonds; USA | 1:43.83	David Mutinda Mutua; KEN | 1:43.99	Khadevis Robinson; USA | 1:44.03	Boaz Kiplagat Lalang; KEN | 1:44.22	Alfred Kirwa Yego; KEN | 1:44.55	Jeff Lastennet; FRA | 1:46.68
Men's 5000m	Mo Farah; GBR | 12:53.11	Bernard Lagat; USA | 12:53.60	Isiah Kiplangat Koech; KEN | 12:54.18	Imane Merga; ETH | 12:55.47	Thomas Pkemei Longosiwa; KEN | 12:56.08	Eliud Kipchoge; KEN | 12:59.01	Tariku Bekele; ETH | 12:59.25	Yenew Alamirew; ETH | 13:00.46
Men's 400mH	Angelo Taylor; USA | 47.97	Bershawn Jackson; USA | 48.22	David Greene; GBR | 48.43	LJ van Zyl; RSA | 48.72	Cornel Fredericks; RSA | 48.96	Jeshua Anderson; USA | 49.43	Kerron Clement; USA | 49.48	Johnny Dutch; USA | 50.17
Men's 3000mSC	Brimin Kiprop Kipruto; KEN | 7:53.64	Ezekiel Kemboi; KEN | 7:55.76	Paul Kipsiele Koech; KEN | 7:57.32	Bouabdellah Tahri; FRA | 8:05.72	Richard Kipkemboi Mateelong; KEN | 8:07.41	Jonathan Muia Ndiku; KEN | 8:07.75	Hilal Yego; KEN | 8:08.22	Roba Gari; ETH | 8:12.10
Men's Pole Vault	Renaud Lavillenie; FRA | 5.90 m	Malte Mohr; GER | 5.75 m	Romain Mesnil; FRA | 5.60 m	Konstantinos Filippidis; GRE | 5.60 m	Damiel Dossevi; FRA | 5.60 m	Derek Miles; USA | 5.60 m	Daichi Sawano; JPN | 5.45 m	Steven Hooker; AUS | 5.45 m
Men's Triple Jump	Phillips Idowu; GBR | 17.36 m	Alexis Copello; CUB | 17.30 m	David Girat; CUB | 17.29 m	Will Claye; USA | 16.99 m	Christian Olsson; SWE | 16.98 m	Benjamin Compaoré; FRA | 16.97 m	Christian Taylor; USA | 16.74 m	Seref Osmanoglu; UKR | 16.67 m
Men's Shot Put	Reese Hoffa; USA | 21.25 m	Christian Cantwell; USA | 21.23 m	Dylan Armstrong; CAN | 20.98 m	Marco Fortes; POR | 20.39 m	Dan Taylor; USA | 19.58 m			
Women's 200m (-0.4 m/s)	Carmelita Jeter; USA | 22.20	Allyson Felix; USA | 22.32	Shalonda Solomon; USA | 22.63	Bianca Knight; USA | 22.71	Kerron Stewart; JAM | 22.76	Jeneba Tarmoh; USA | 22.93	Debbie Ferguson-McKenzie; BAH | 23.02	Myriam Soumaré; FRA | 23.37
Women's 400m	Amantle Montsho; BOT | 49.71	Francena McCorory; USA | 50.29	Novlene Williams-Mills; JAM | 50.61	Rose-Marie Whyte-Robinson; JAM | 50.87	Davita Prendergast; JAM | 51.11	Denisa Rosolová; CZE | 51.38	Debbie Dunn; USA | 52.05	Muriel Hurtis; FRA | 52.73
Women's 1500m	Maryam Yusuf Jamal; BRN | 4:00.59	Ibtissam Lakhouad; MAR | 4:01.09	Morgan Uceny; USA | 4:01.51	Siham Hilali; MAR | 4:02.75	Jenny Simpson; USA | 4:03.54	Irene Jelagat; KEN | 4:04.01	Meskerem Assefa; ETH | 4:04.48	Lisa Dobriskey; GBR | 4:04.76
Women's 100mH (+0.9 m/s)	Sally Pearson; AUS | 12.51	Kellie Wells; USA | 12.58	Tiffany Porter; GBR | 12.60	Danielle Carruthers; USA | 12.76	Dawn Harper-Nelson; USA | 12.79	Nia Ali; USA | 12.98	Yvette Lewis; USA | 13.05	Sandra Gomis; FRA | 13.07
Women's High Jump	Blanka Vlašić; CRO | 1.97 m	Doreen Amata; NGR | 1.92 m	Mélanie Melfort; FRA | 1.89 m	Marina Aitova; KAZ | 1.89 m	Brigetta Barrett; USA | 1.85 m	Elizabeth Patterson; USA | 1.85 m	Ebba Jungmark; SWE | 1.85 m	Emma Green; SWE | 1.85 m
Women's Long Jump	Brittney Reese; USA | 6.82 m	Darya Klishina; RUS | 6.79 m	Éloyse Lesueur-Aymonin; FRA | 6.74 m	Irene Pusterla; SUI | 6.70 m	Carolina Klüft; SWE | 6.65 m	Funmi Jimoh; USA | 6.65 m	Janay Deloach; USA | 6.62 m	Naide Gomes; POR | 6.48 m
Women's Discus Throw	Nadine Müller; GER | 65.90 m	Yarelis Barrios; CUB | 65.44 m	Stephanie Brown-Trafton; USA | 62.07 m	Aretha D. Thurmond; USA | 60.71 m	Dani Stevens; AUS | 60.59 m	Nicoleta Grasu; ROU | 59.60 m	Melina Robert-Michon; FRA | 58.51 m	Kateryna Karsak; UKR | 58.04 m
Women's Javelin Throw	Barbora Špotáková; CZE | 69.45 m	Christina Obergföll; GER | 64.86 m	Madara Palameika; LAT | 62.06 m	Goldie Sayers; GBR | 60.97 m	Sunette Viljoen; RSA | 59.94 m	Vera Markaryan; UKR | 59.45 m	Zahra Bani; ITA | 57.04 m	Kara Winger; USA | 55.67 m

Stockholm
Event	1st +4 pts	2nd +2 pts	3rd +1 pts	4th ⠀	5th ⠀	6th ⠀	7th ⠀	8th ⠀
Men's 200m (-1.2 m/s)	Usain Bolt; JAM | 20.03	Alonso Edward; PAN | 20.47	Ainsley Waugh; JAM | 20.56	Jaysuma Saidy Ndure; NOR | 20.67	Richard Thompson; TTO | 20.85	Trell Kimmons; USA | 20.94	Jeremy Dodson; USA | 21.32	Marvin Anderson; JAM | DQ
Men's 400m	Jermaine Gonzales; JAM | 44.69	LaShawn Merritt; USA | 44.74	Christopher Brown; BAH | 44.79	Angelo Taylor; USA | 44.82	Rondell Bartholomew; GRN | 45.32	Jonathan Borlée; BEL | 45.45	Renny Quow; TTO | 45.99	Johan Wissman; SWE | 46.16
Men's 1500m	Silas Kiplagat; KEN | 3:33.94	Asbel Kiprop; KEN | 3:34.42	Nick Willis; NZL | 3:34.49	Daniel Kipchirchir Komen; KEN | 3:34.51	Collins Cheboi; KEN | 3:35.07	Nixon Kiplimo Chepseba; KEN | 3:35.83	Lopez Lomong; USA | 3:35.87	Jeffrey Riseley; AUS | 3:36.16
Men's 110mH (-2.3 m/s)	Jason Richardson; USA | 13.17	David Oliver; USA | 13.28	Dwight Thomas; JAM | 13.40	Aries Merritt; USA | 13.41	Tyron Akins; USA | 13.61	Omoghan Osaghae; USA | 13.65	Joel Brown; USA | 13.71	
Men's 3000mSC	Paul Kipsiele Koech; KEN | 8:05.92	Benjamin Kiplagat; UGA | 8:14.42	Jonathan Muia Ndiku; KEN | 8:17.77	Hilal Yego; KEN | 8:19.30	Jairus Kipchoge Birech; KEN | 8:19.41	Elijah Chelimo; KEN | 8:24.98	Richard Kipkemboi Mateelong; KEN | 8:30.46	Abubaker Ali Kamal; QAT | 8:38.36
Men's High Jump	Ivan Ukhov; RUS | 2.34 m	Jesse Williams; USA | 2.32 m	Andrey Silnov; RUS | 2.30 m	Mutaz Essa Barshim; QAT | 2.30 m	Aleksandr Shustov; RUS | 2.30 m	Jaroslav Bába; CZE | 2.27 m	Aleksey Dmitrik; RUS | 2.22 m	Raul Spank; GER | 2.22 m
Men's Long Jump	Mitchell Watt; AUS | 8.54 m	Yahya Berrabah; MAR | 8.40 m	Irving Saladino; PAN | 8.19 m	Robert Crowther; AUS | 8.12 m	Ignisious Gaisah; GHA | 7.99 m	Will Claye; USA | 7.98 m	Morten Jensen; DEN | 7.98 m	Tyrone Smith; BER | 7.92 m
Men's Discus Throw	Virgilijus Alekna; LTU | 65.05 m	Piotr Małachowski; POL | 64.96 m	Frank Casanas; ESP | 63.42 m	Erik Cadée; NED | 63.21 m	Gerd Kanter; EST | 62.98 m	Märt Israel; EST | 62.11 m	Benn Harradine; AUS | 61.99 m	Martin Wierig; GER | 61.92 m
Men's Javelin Throw	Andreas Thorkildsen; NOR | 88.43 m	Matthias de Zordo; GER | 84.37 m	Stuart Farquhar; NZL | 84.21 m	Vítězslav Veselý; CZE | 83.44 m	Sergey Makarov; RUS | 82.26 m	Oleksandr Pyatnytsya; UKR | 79.83 m	Tero Pitkämäki; FIN | 77.82 m	Harri Haatainen; FIN | 76.10 m
Women's 100m (-2.4 m/s)	Carmelita Jeter; USA | 11.15	Marshevet Hooker; USA | 11.21	Kerron Stewart; JAM | 11.27	Candyce McGrone; USA | 11.49	Mikele Barber; USA | 11.49	Debbie Ferguson-McKenzie; BAH | 11.52	Schillonie Calvert-Powell; JAM | 11.58	Ezinne Okparaebo; NOR | 11.61
Women's 800m	Kenia Sinclair; JAM | 1:58.21	Malika Akkaoui; MAR | 1:59.75	Yuneysi Santiusti; CUB | 2:00.06	Alice Schmidt; USA | 2:00.25	Alysia Montaño; USA | 2:00.69	Halima Hachlaf; MAR | 2:00.70	Caster Semenya; RSA | 2:01.28	Yelena Kotulskaya; RUS | 2:01.43
Women's 5000m	Vivian Jepkemei Cheruiyot; KEN | 14:20.87	Sally Kipyego; KEN | 14:43.87	Sylvia Jebiwot Kibet; KEN | 14:45.31	Shalane Flanagan; USA | 14:46.80	Priscah Jepleting Cherono; KEN | 14:51.55	Pauline Chemning Korikwiang; KEN | 14:52.51	Mercy Cherono; KEN | 14:58.66	Dolores Checa; ESP | 15:02.24
Women's 400mH	Kaliese Carter; JAM | 53.74	Melaine Walker; JAM | 54.71	Nickiesha Wilson; JAM | 55.80	Anna Ryzhykova; UKR | 56.22	T'erea Brown; USA | 56.58	Lauren Boden; AUS | 56.60	Queen Claye; USA | 56.99	Anna Jesień; POL | 58.09
Women's Pole Vault	Yelena Isinbayeva; RUS | 4.76 m	Silke Spiegelburg; GER | 4.70 m	Jennifer Suhr; USA | 4.64 m	Svetlana Feofanova; RUS | 4.64 m	Fabiana Murer; BRA | 4.51 m	Martina Strutz; GER | 4.51 m	Monika Pyrek; POL | 4.51 m	Angelica Bengtsson; SWE | 4.41 m
Women's Triple Jump	Olha Saladukha; UKR | 15.06 m	Yargelis Savigne; CUB | 14.87 m	Caterine Ibarguen; COL | 14.83 m	Mabel Gay; CUB | 14.57 m	Dana Velďáková; SVK | 14.21 m	Anna Krylova; RUS | 14.06 m	Małgorzata Trybańska; POL | 14.02 m	Katja Demut; GER | 13.85 m
Women's Shot Put	Valerie Adams; NZL | 20.57 m	Nadezhda Ostapchuk; BLR | DQ	Jillian Camarena-Williams; USA | 19.87 m	Cleopatra Borel; TTO | 19.15 m	Christina Schwanitz; GER | 19.14 m	Michelle Carter; USA | 19.06 m	Nadine Kleinert; GER | 18.98 m	Misleydis González; CUB | 18.53 m

London
Event	1st +4 pts	2nd +2 pts	3rd +1 pts	4th ⠀	5th ⠀	6th ⠀	7th ⠀	8th ⠀
Men's 200m (-2.0 m/s)	Walter Dix; USA | 20.16	Warren Weir; JAM | 20.43	Alonso Edward; PAN | 20.55	Marvin Anderson; JAM | 20.60	Mario Forsythe; JAM | 20.76	Christian Malcolm; GBR | 20.90	James Ellington; GBR | 21.03	Robin Erewa; GER | 21.60
Men's 400m	Kirani James; GRN | 44.61	Jermaine Gonzales; JAM | 44.85	Christopher Brown; BAH | 45.04	Angelo Taylor; USA | 45.04	Kévin Borlée; BEL | 45.50	Tabarie Henry; ISV | 45.67	Rondell Bartholomew; GRN | 45.86	Martyn Rooney; GBR | 45.87
Men's Mile	Leonel Manzano; USA | 3:51.24	Bernard Lagat; USA | 3:51.38	Augustine Kiprono Choge; KEN | 3:51.50	Lopez Lomong; USA | 3:55.20	Bethwell Birgen; KEN | 3:56.22	Bartosz Nowicki; POL | 3:57.19	James Kaan; AUS | 3:57.70	Nick McCormick; GBR | 3:58.78
Men's 110mH (-0.6 m/s)	Dayron Robles; CUB | 13.04	Jason Richardson; USA | 13.08	David Oliver; USA | 13.19	Dwight Thomas; JAM | 13.29	Joel Brown; USA | 13.31	Aries Merritt; USA | 13.32	Andrew Turner; GBR | 13.46	Kevin Craddock; USA | 13.73
Men's High Jump	Andrey Silnov; RUS | 2.36 m	Jesse Williams; USA | 2.34 m	Aleksandr Shustov; RUS | 2.31 m	Donald Thomas; BAH | 2.31 m	Mutaz Essa Barshim; QAT | 2.28 m	Tom Parsons; GBR | 2.28 m	Jaroslav Bába; CZE | 2.25 m	Martyn Bernard; GBR | 2.25 m
Men's Long Jump	Mitchell Watt; AUS | 8.45 m	Chris Tomlinson; GBR | 8.30 m	Greg Rutherford; GBR | 8.19 m	Irving Saladino; PAN | 8.14 m	Marquise Goodwin; USA | 8.02 m	Godfrey Khotso Mokoena; RSA | 7.93 m	Julian Reid; GBR | 7.84 m	Ignisious Gaisah; GHA | 7.82 m
Men's Discus Throw	Virgilijus Alekna; LTU | 66.71 m	Zoltán Kővágó; HUN | 66.29 m	Ehsan Hadadi; IRI | 64.76 m	Gerd Kanter; EST | 64.56 m	Frank Casanas; ESP | 64.36 m	Martin Wierig; GER | 63.99 m	Erik Cadée; NED | 62.24 m	Brett Morse; GBR | 61.96 m
Women's 100m (-0.4 m/s)	Carmelita Jeter; USA | 10.93	Kelly-Ann Baptiste; TTO | 10.97	Shelly-Ann Fraser-Pryce; JAM | 11.10	Schillonie Calvert-Powell; JAM | 11.23	Blessing Okagbare; NGR | 11.25	Alexandria Anderson; USA | 11.26	Aleen Bailey; JAM | 11.36	Ivet Lalova-Collio; BUL | 11.38
Women's 800m	Jennifer Meadows; GBR | 1:58.60	Kenia Sinclair; JAM | 1:59.16	Lucia Hrivnák Klocová; SVK | 1:59.65	Marilyn Okoro; GBR | 1:59.85	Emma Jackson; GBR | 1:59.97	Molly Ludlow; USA | 2:00.18	Hellen Obiri; KEN | 2:00.54	Ingvill Måkestad Bovim; NOR | 2:00.68
Women's 5000m	Lauren Fleshman; USA | 15:00.57	Helen Clitheroe; GBR | 15:06.75	Grace Momanyi; KEN | 15:07.49	Desiree Linden; USA | 15:08.64	Jennifer Rhines; USA | 15:10.44	Genet Yalew; ETH | 15:12.42	Amy Cragg; USA | 15:17.22	Jessica Augusto; POR | 15:19.60
Women's 400mH	Kaliese Carter; JAM | 52.79	Melaine Walker; JAM | 53.90	Perri Shakes-Drayton; GBR | 54.62	Zuzana Hejnová; CZE | 54.74	Queen Claye; USA | 55.51	Eilidh Doyle; GBR | 55.76	Ristananna Tracey; JAM | 56.07	T'erea Brown; USA | 57.13
Women's 3000mSC	Milcah Chemos; KEN | 9:22.80	Hiwot Ayalew; ETH | 9:23.88	Mercy Wanjiku Njoroge; KEN | 9:27.45	Lydia Chebet Rotich; KEN | 9:32.95	Lidya Chepkurui; KEN | 9:35.13	Gesa Felicitas Krause; GER | 9:35.97	Mekdes Bekele; ETH | 9:36.85	Emma Coburn; USA | 9:37.16
Women's Pole Vault	Jennifer Suhr; USA | 4.79 m	Fabiana Murer; BRA | 4.71 m	Svetlana Feofanova; RUS | 4.71 m	Nikoleta Kyriakopoulou; GRE | 4.71 m	Silke Spiegelburg; GER | 4.63 m	Martina Strutz; GER | 4.63 m	Holly Bradshaw; GBR | 4.55 m	Carolin Hingst; GER | 4.55 m
Women's Triple Jump	Olha Saladukha; UKR | 14.80 m	Olga Rypakova; KAZ | 14.49 m	Dana Velďáková; SVK | 14.48 m	Paraskevi Papachristou; GRE | 14.17 m	Nathalie Marie-Nely; FRA | 14.12 m	Yasmine Regis; GBR | 13.76 m	Laura Samuel; GBR | 13.52 m	Andriyana Banova; BUL | 13.35 m
Women's Shot Put	Valerie Adams; NZL | 20.07 m	Nadezhda Ostapchuk; BLR | DQ	Nadine Kleinert; GER | 19.06 m	Christina Schwanitz; GER | 18.80 m	Cleopatra Borel; TTO | 18.56 m	Michelle Carter; USA | 18.23 m	Josephine Terlecki; GER | 17.94 m	Chiara Rosa; ITA | 17.92 m
Women's Javelin Throw	Christina Obergföll; GER | 66.74 m	Barbora Špotáková; CZE | 66.41 m	Goldie Sayers; GBR | 63.41 m	Madara Palameika; LAT | 60.72 m	Kara Winger; USA | 58.25 m	Jarmila Jurkovičová; CZE | 58.05 m	Ásdís Hjálmsdóttir; ISL | 57.77 m	Esther Eisenlauer; GER | 56.50 m

Zurich
Event	1st +8 pts	2nd +4 pts	3rd +2 pts	4th ⠀	5th ⠀	6th ⠀	7th ⠀	8th ⠀
Men's 100m (0.0 m/s)	Yohan Blake; JAM | 9.82	Asafa Powell; JAM | 9.95	Walter Dix; USA | 10.04	Michael Frater; JAM | 10.06	Kim Collins; SKN | 10.09	Nesta Carter; JAM | 10.12	Jaysuma Saidy Ndure; NOR | 10.20	Richard Thompson; TTO | 10.23
Men's 400m	Kirani James; GRN | 44.36	LaShawn Merritt; USA | 44.67	Jermaine Gonzales; JAM | 45.39	Rondell Bartholomew; GRN | 45.43	Christopher Brown; BAH | 45.47	Martyn Rooney; GBR | 45.63	Greg Nixon; USA | 45.85	Angelo Taylor; USA | 46.33
Men's 1500m	Nixon Kiplimo Chepseba; KEN | 3:32.74	Silas Kiplagat; KEN | 3:33.56	Haron Keitany; KEN | 3:34.37	Mohamed Moustaoui; MAR | 3:34.61	Augustine Kiprono Choge; KEN | 3:34.67	Mekonnen Gebremedhin; ETH | 3:34.75	Asbel Kiprop; KEN | 3:34.89	Daniel Kipchirchir Komen; KEN | 3:36.78
Men's 110mH (+0.1 m/s)	Dayron Robles; CUB | 13.01	Jason Richardson; USA | 13.10	David Oliver; USA | 13.26	Aries Merritt; USA | 13.35	Andrew Turner; GBR | 13.41	Dwight Thomas; JAM | 13.49	Andreas Kundert; SUI | 13.99	William Sharman; GBR | 14.12
Men's 3000mSC	Ezekiel Kemboi; KEN | 8:07.72	Paul Kipsiele Koech; KEN | 8:07.89	Benjamin Kiplagat; UGA | 8:12.08	Ruben Ramolefi; RSA | 8:15.40	Jonathan Muia Ndiku; KEN | 8:16.15	Hilal Yego; KEN | 8:20.31	Ivan Lukyanov; MDA | 8:22.24	Richard Kipkemboi Mateelong; KEN | 8:28.81
Men's High Jump	Dimitrios Chondrokoukis; GRE | 2.32 m	Trevor Barry; BAH | 2.30 m	Ivan Ukhov; RUS | 2.28 m	Jesse Williams; USA | 2.28 m	Dmytro Demyanyuk; UKR | 2.28 m	Mutaz Essa Barshim; QAT | 2.28 m	Raul Spank; GER | 2.25 m	Kyriakos Ioannou; CYP | 2.25 m
Men's Long Jump	Ngonidzashe Makusha; ZIM | 8.00 m	Aleksandr Menkov; RUS | 7.94 m	Marcos Chuva; POR | 7.88 m	Dwight Phillips; USA | 7.87 m	Sebastian Bayer; GER | 7.78 m	Will Claye; USA | 7.34 m	Mitchell Watt; AUS | 6.97 m	
Men's Shot Put indoor	Dylan Armstrong; CAN | 21.63 m	Ryan Whiting; USA | 21.52 m	Reese Hoffa; USA | 21.39 m	Tomasz Majewski; POL | 21.38 m	David Storl; GER | 21.23 m	Marco Fortes; POR | 20.78 m	Ralf Bartels; GER | 20.05 m	Carlos Véliz; CUB | 20.00 m
Men's Discus Throw	Robert Harting; GER | 67.02 m	Virgilijus Alekna; LTU | 66.69 m	Zoltán Kővágó; HUN | DQ	Gerd Kanter; EST | 65.52 m	Martin Wierig; GER | 65.47 m	Piotr Małachowski; POL | 64.49 m	Erik Cadée; NED | 62.86 m	Ehsan Hadadi; IRI | 62.67 m
Women's 200m (-0.1 m/s)	Carmelita Jeter; USA | 22.27	Allyson Felix; USA | 22.40	Shelly-Ann Fraser-Pryce; JAM | 22.59	Shalonda Solomon; USA | 22.63	Debbie Ferguson-McKenzie; BAH | 22.82	Bianca Knight; USA | 23.05	Sherone Simpson; JAM | 23.30	Kerron Stewart; JAM | 23.54
Women's 800m	Mariya Savinova; RUS | DQ	Alysia Montaño; USA | 1:58.41	Jennifer Meadows; GBR | 1:58.92	Janeth Jepkosgei; KEN | 1:59.71	Caster Semenya; RSA | 1:59.77	Yekaterina Kostetskaya; RUS | DQ	Morgan Uceny; USA | 2:00.59	Malika Akkaoui; MAR | 2:01.47
Women's 5000m	Vivian Jepkemei Cheruiyot; KEN | 14:30.10	Sally Kipyego; KEN | 14:30.42	Linet Chepkwemoi Masai; KEN | 14:35.11	Sylvia Jebiwot Kibet; KEN | 14:35.43	Priscah Jepleting Cherono; KEN | 14:44.82	Meselech Melkamu; ETH | 14:45.76	Sentayehu Ejigu; ETH | 14:55.28	Viola Jelagat Kibiwot; KEN | 15:03.97
Women's 400mH	Kaliese Carter; JAM | 53.36	Melaine Walker; JAM | 53.43	Lashinda Demus; USA | 54.04	Natalya Antyukh; RUS | 54.50	Zuzana Hejnová; CZE | 54.89	Anastasiya Rabchenyuk; UKR | 55.27	Queen Claye; USA | 55.54	Yelena Churakova; RUS | 55.72
Women's Pole Vault	Jennifer Suhr; USA | 4.72 m	Silke Spiegelburg; GER | 4.72 m	Fabiana Murer; BRA | 4.62 m	Yelena Isinbayeva; RUS | 4.62 m	Yarisley Silva; CUB | 4.62 m	Svetlana Feofanova; RUS | 4.52 m	Anna Rogowska; POL | 4.42 m	Nicole Büchler; SUI | 4.42 m
Women's Long Jump	Brittney Reese; USA | 6.72 m	Nastassia Mironchyk-Ivanova; BLR | 6.67 m	Ineta Radēviča; LAT | 6.61 m	Irene Pusterla; SUI | 6.60 m	Olga Kucherenko; RUS | DQ	Janay Deloach; USA | 6.53 m	Carolina Klüft; SWE | 6.43 m	Funmi Jimoh; USA | 6.23 m
Women's Shot Put indoor	Valerie Adams; NZL | 20.51 m	Nadezhda Ostapchuk; BLR | DQ	Jillian Camarena-Williams; USA | 19.64 m	Natalya Mikhnevich; BLR | 18.95 m	Cleopatra Borel; TTO | 18.92 m	Michelle Carter; USA | 18.82 m	Yevgeniya Kolodko; RUS | 18.65 m	Nadine Kleinert; GER | 18.56 m
Women's Javelin Throw	Christina Obergföll; GER | 69.57 m	Sunette Viljoen; RSA | 67.46 m	Mariya Abakumova; RUS | DQ	Barbora Špotáková; CZE | 63.56 m	Goldie Sayers; GBR | 62.25 m	Katharina Molitor; GER | 61.85 m	Martina Ratej; SLO | 61.46 m	Madara Palameika; LAT | 59.76 m

Brussels
Event	1st +8 pts	2nd +4 pts	3rd +2 pts	4th ⠀	5th ⠀	6th ⠀	7th ⠀	8th ⠀
Men's 200m (+0.7 m/s)	Yohan Blake; JAM | 19.26	Walter Dix; USA | 19.53	Nickel Ashmeade; JAM | 19.91	Jaysuma Saidy Ndure; NOR | 19.97	Rondel Sorrillo; TTO | 20.41	Ainsley Waugh; JAM | 20.57	Jonathan Åstrand; FIN | 20.73	Rytis Sakalauskas; LTU | 20.74
Men's 800m	David Rudisha; KEN | 1:43.96	Mohammed Aman; ETH | 1:44.29	Asbel Kiprop; KEN | 1:44.46	Marcin Lewandowski; POL | 1:44.53	Alfred Kirwa Yego; KEN | 1:44.98	Andreas Bube; DEN | 1:45.04	Jackson Mumbwa Kivuva; KEN | 1:45.27	Bram Som; NED | 1:45.81
Men's 5000m	Imane Merga; ETH | 12:58.32	Thomas Pkemei Longosiwa; KEN | 12:58.70	Vincent Kiprop Chepkok; KEN | 12:59.50	Tariku Bekele; ETH | 13:01.85	Alistair Ian Cragg; IRL | 13:03.53	Albert Rop; KEN | 13:03.70	Polat Kemboi Arikan; TUR | 13:05.98	Patrick Mutunga Mwikya; KEN | 13:19.13
Men's 400mH	Javier Culson; PUR | 48.32	David Greene; GBR | 48.78	Cornel Fredericks; RSA | 48.96	Jehue Gordon; TTO | 48.98	Félix Sánchez; DOM | 49.00	Georg Fleischhauer; GER | 49.28	Isa Phillips; JAM | 49.41	Aleksandr Derevyagin; RUS | 49.94
Men's Pole Vault	Konstantinos Filippidis; GRE | 5.72 m	Renaud Lavillenie; FRA | 5.72 m	Malte Mohr; GER | 5.62 m	Dmitriy Starodubtsev; RUS | 5.62 m	Mateusz Didenkow; POL | 5.52 m	Romain Mesnil; FRA | 5.42 m	Björn Otto; GER | 5.42 m	Łukasz Michalski; POL | 5.42 m
Men's Triple Jump	Benjamin Compaoré; FRA | 17.31 m	Seref Osmanoglu; UKR | 16.93 m	Alexis Copello; CUB | 16.89 m	Fabrizio Schembri; ITA | 16.63 m	Phillips Idowu; GBR | 16.29 m	Gaetan Saku Bafuanga; FRA | 14.85 m	Will Claye; USA | DNS m	Fabrizio Donato; ITA | DNS m
Men's Shot Put	Reese Hoffa; USA | 22.09 m	Christian Cantwell; USA | 22.07 m	Andrei Mikhnevich; BLR | DQ	Dylan Armstrong; CAN | 21.47 m	Ryan Whiting; USA | 21.19 m	Tomasz Majewski; POL | 21.15 m	Marco Fortes; POR | 19.83 m	Pavel Lyzhyn; BLR | 19.76 m
Men's Javelin Throw	Matthias de Zordo; GER | 88.36 m	Vadims Vasiļevskis; LAT | 85.06 m	Fatih Avan; TUR | 84.79 m	Vítězslav Veselý; CZE | 82.20 m	Andreas Thorkildsen; NOR | 81.86 m	Roman Avramenko; UKR | 80.53 m	Ari Mannio; FIN | 79.88 m	Dmitriy Tarabin; RUS | 78.52 m
Women's 100m (+0.4 m/s)	Carmelita Jeter; USA | 10.78	Veronica Campbell-Brown; JAM | 10.85	Kelly-Ann Baptiste; TTO | 10.90	Shalonda Solomon; USA | 11.08	Debbie Ferguson-McKenzie; BAH | 11.30	Ezinne Okparaebo; NOR | 11.32	Mikele Barber; USA | 11.33	Mariya Ryemyen; UKR | 11.33
Women's 400m	Amantle Montsho; BOT | 50.16	Novlene Williams-Mills; JAM | 50.72	Tatyana Firova; RUS | DQ	Antonina Krivoshapka; RUS | 51.06	Christine Ohuruogu; GBR | 51.37	Davita Prendergast; JAM | 52.12	Muriel Hurtis; FRA | 54.40	Antonina Yefremova; UKR | DQ
Women's 1500m	Morgan Uceny; USA | 4:00.06	Mariem Alaoui Selsouli; MAR | 4:00.77	Maryam Yusuf Jamal; BRN | 4:01.40	Anna Mishchenko; UKR | 4:01.73	Hannah England; GBR | 4:02.03	Janeth Jepkosgei; KEN | 4:02.32	Hellen Obiri; KEN | 4:02.42	Natalia Rodríguez; ESP | 4:02.57
Women's 100mH (+0.4 m/s)	Danielle Carruthers; USA | 12.65	Yvette Lewis; USA | 12.77	Kellie Wells; USA | 12.77	Nia Ali; USA | 12.79	Brigitte Ann Foster-Hylton; JAM | 12.91	Phylicia George; CAN | 12.96	Nikkita Holder; CAN | 13.00	Anne Zagré; BEL | 13.20
Women's 3000mSC	Yuliya Zaripova; RUS | DQ	Habiba Ghribi; TUN | 9:16.57	Mercy Wanjiku Njoroge; KEN | 9:20.09	Sofia Assefa; ETH | 9:21.20	Milcah Chemos; KEN | 9:21.41	Hiwot Ayalew; ETH | 9:26.25	Mekdes Bekele; ETH | 9:26.51	Lydia Chebet Rotich; KEN | 9:35.21
Women's High Jump	Anna Chicherova; RUS | 2.05 m	Yelena Slesarenko; RUS | DQ	Ebba Jungmark; SWE | 1.93 m	Svetlana Shkolina; RUS | 1.93 m	Blanka Vlašić; CRO | 1.93 m	Antonietta di Martino; ITA | 1.93 m	Mélanie Melfort; FRA | 1.90 m	Oksana Okuneva; UKR | 1.90 m
Women's Triple Jump	Olha Saladukha; UKR | 14.67 m	Mabel Gay; CUB | 14.58 m	Olga Rypakova; KAZ | 14.49 m	Yamilé Aldama; GBR | 14.29 m	Simona la Mantia; ITA | 14.27 m	Dana Velďáková; SVK | 14.07 m	Anna Krylova; RUS | 13.53 m	Małgorzata Trybańska; POL | 13.21 m
Women's Discus Throw	Yanfeng Li; CHN | 66.27 m	Yarelis Barrios; CUB | 65.33 m	Żaneta Glanc; POL | 62.78 m	Tan Jian; CHN | 61.64 m	Stephanie Brown-Trafton; USA | 60.82 m	Nadine Müller; GER | 59.50 m	Aretha D. Thurmond; USA | 59.01 m	Kateryna Karsak; UKR | 58.24 m
