= Nixon Chepseba =

Kenyan middle distance runner

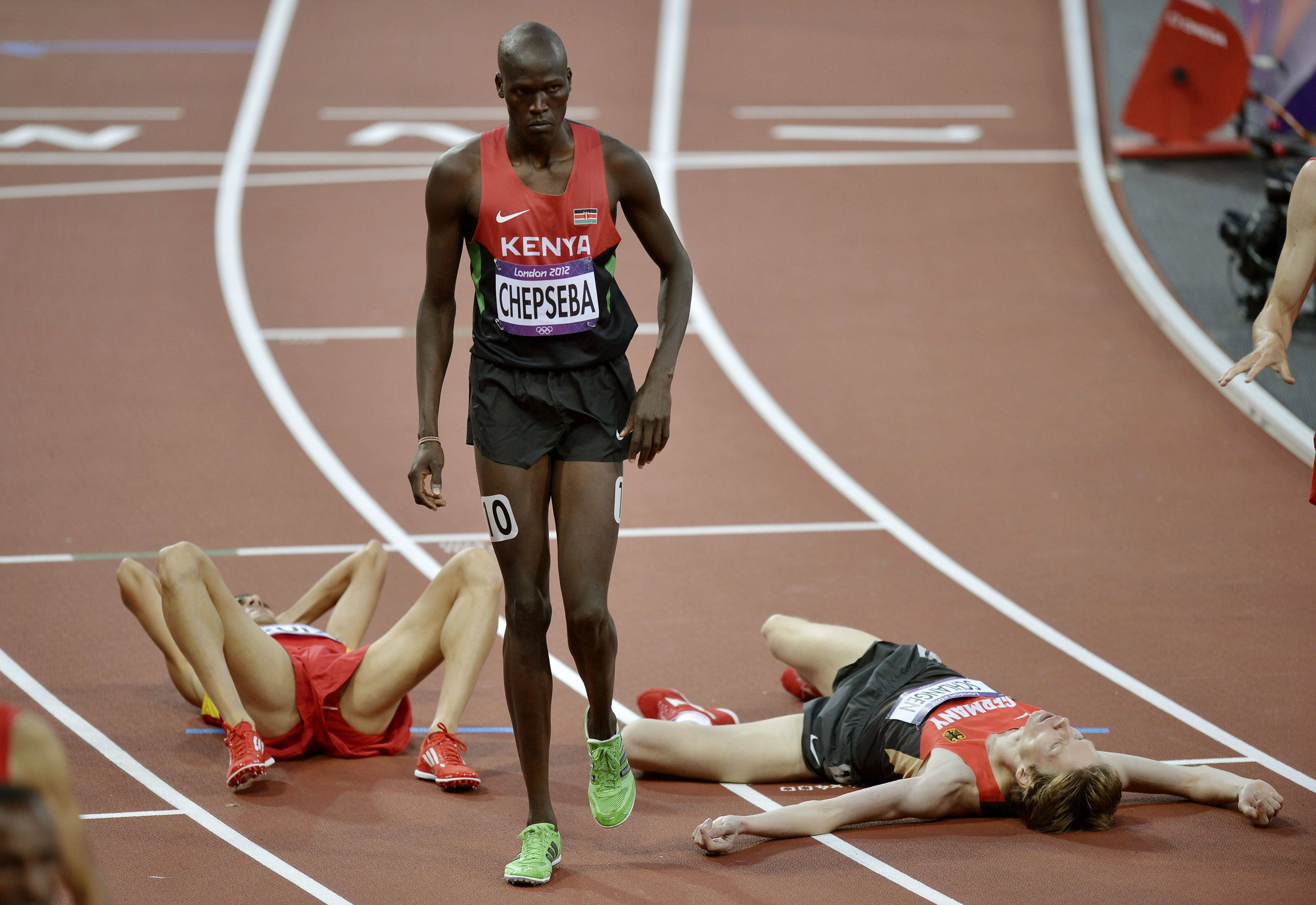
Chepseba in 2012

Nixon Kiplimo Chepseba (born 12 December 1990) (Keiyo in Kenya) is a Kenyan middle-distance runner (1.84m) who specializes in the 1500 metres. He was the 2011 Diamond League series winner of that event and has a personal best of 3:29.90 minutes.

Chepseba gained his first international selection for the 2009 African Junior Athletics Championships via a trial event at Nyayo National Stadium. At the competitions, he took the silver medal in the 1500 m behind fellow Kenyan James Magut (who ran a championship record). He made his European debut later that year, winning at the Antwerp Gala and setting a meet record of 2:18.61 min for the 1000 m at the Athletics Bridge in Slovakia. He trains in Kaptagat.

He moved up to the senior ranks the year after and ran an indoor best of 3:35.82 min for the 1500 m in Leipzig in February 2010. Another personal best (3:33.99 min) came at the Shanghai Golden Grand Prix in his first Diamond League appearance. He also ran at the Golden Gala and Memorial van Damme meetings that year and finished his season with a personal best run of 3:32.42 min for third at the Rieti Meeting.

Chepseba established himself as a top-level competitor during the 2011 indoor season. He defeated Deresse Mekonnen and Silas Kiplagat at the Meeting Pas de Calais with a world-leading time, then improved further at the PSD Bank Meeting to defeat Augustine Choge with a world-leading and meet record time of 3:34.63 min. He continued his winning streak outdoors with consecutive 2011 Diamond League victories in Doha and Shanghai, setting a meet record of 3:31.42 min to beat the Olympic champion Asbel Kiprop at the latter event. He came sixth in the Oslo Dream Mile and was fifth at the Kenyan Championships, missing out on a place for the 2011 World Championships in Athletics. He turned his attention to the Diamond League circuit instead and a win at the Weltklasse Zurich meet saw him top the rankings to become the 2011 Diamond League winner over 1500 m. He ended his year on a high, setting a meet record and personal best of 3:30.94 min to win at the Hanžeković Memorial.

In May 2012, he won the 1500m at the Hengelo meeting in a new personal best time of 3:29.90, making him only the 22nd runner in history to better the 3:30 barrier, and making him the 8th fastest Kenyan 1500m runner in history.

He finished fourth in the 1500 m at the 2013 World Championships.

== Career Legacy and later activity ==
By 2020, Chepseba had largely transitioned away from elite international Diamond League competition. Although he remains an active figure in the Kenyan athletics community, training alongside elite groups in Kaptagat, he has not recorded a competitive result at the world-class level since the mid-2010s. His career is noted for his 2011 Diamond League title and his sub-3:30 personal best in the 1500 metres, which maintains his standing among the fastest Kenyan middle-distance runners in history.

== Personal bests ==
- 800 metres: 1:46.82 min
- 1500 metres: 3:29.77 min
- Mile run: 3:50.95 min
