= Danielle Carruthers =

American hurdler (born 1979)

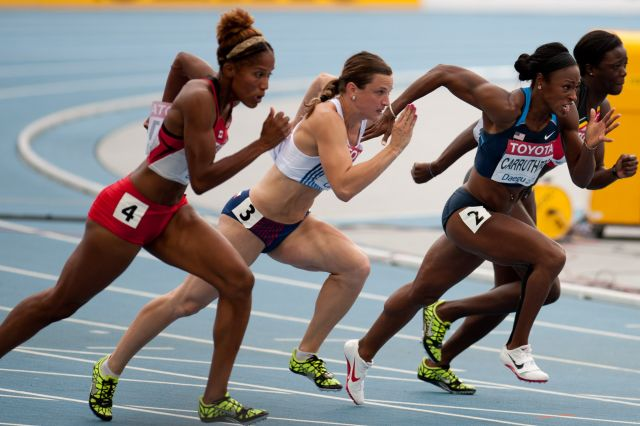
- Carruthers at the 13th World Championships in Athletics in Daegu.
Medal record
Women's athletics
Representing the United States
World Championships
Silver medal – second place	2011 Daegu	100 m hudrles

Danielle Carruthers (born December 22, 1979) is an American hurdler who was a silver medalist in the 100-meter hurdles at the 2011 World Championships in Athletics. Her personal best time is 12.47 seconds, set at that competition.

Hailing from Paducah, Kentucky, she first became well known on the Indiana University track team. She had won the 60-meter hurdles at the 2005 and 2006 NCAA Women's Indoor Track and Field Championships.

She finished eighth at the 2001 Summer Universiade, fourth at the 2006 World Indoor Championships and seventh at the 2006 World Athletics Final.

Carruthers finished second behind Sally Pearson of Australia at the World Athletics Championships in 2011, in the 100 m hurdles where Carruthers set a new personal best of 12.47 in front of compatriot Dawn Harper, the reigning Olympic champion at the event. It was there that Pearson set a new championship record of 12.28. Carruthers won the 2011 Diamond League trophy over Pearson.

Carruthers did not compete in the 2013 and 2014 seasons.

Carruthers was inducted into the Indiana University Athletics Hall of Fame November 3, 2017.
