= Elijah Kipterege =

Kenyan long-distance runner (born 1987)

Elijah Chelimo Kipterege (born 20 April 1987) is a Kenyan long-distance runner who specializes in the 3000 metres steeplechase.

He finished eleventh at the 2009 World Athletics Final. His personal best time is 8:10.63 minutes, achieved in May 2009 in Doha.
