= Dolores Checa =

Spanish runner (born 1982)

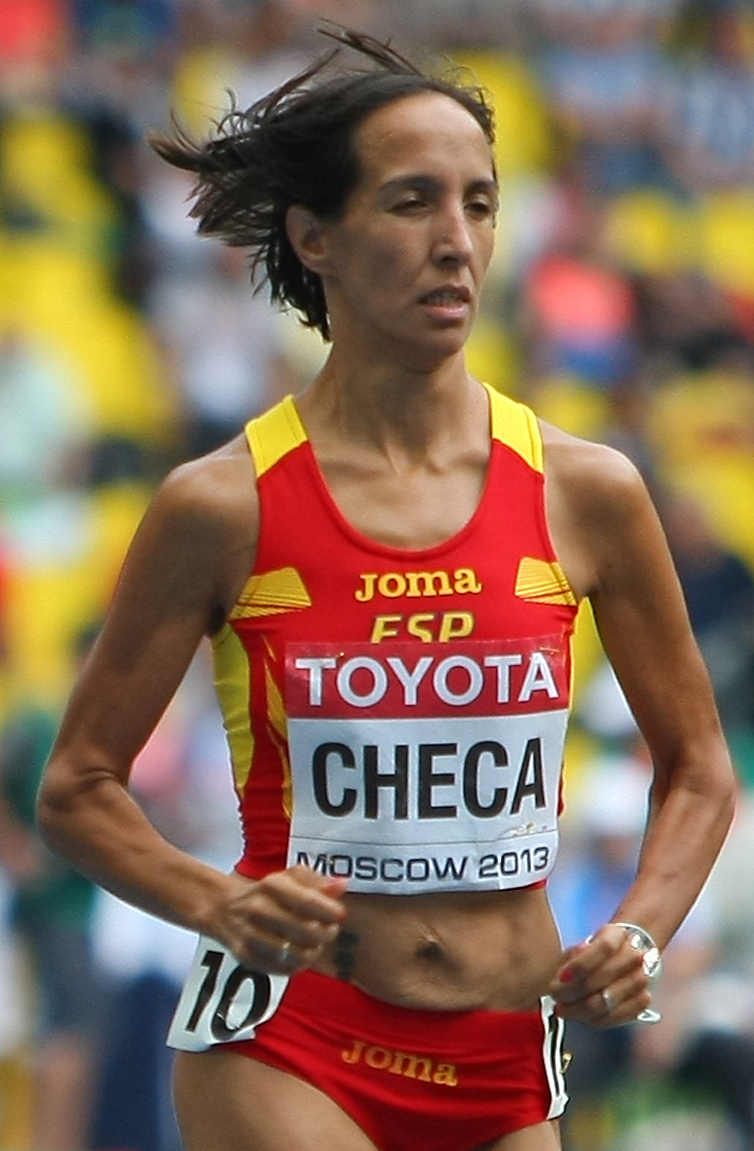
2013

Dolores Checa (born December 27, 1982, in Valencia) is a Spanish middle-distance and long-distance runner. She represented her country at the 2008 Beijing Olympics and the 2007 World Championships in Athletics.

Her international debut came at the 1999 World Youth Championships in Athletics, where she competed in the 1500 metres. She was the 3000 metres gold medallist at the 2008 Ibero-American Championships and won the 5000 metres at the 2009 European Team Championships. She won the 5000 m title for a second time at the 2011 European Team Championships. She has also represented Spain over 3000 m at the European Athletics Indoor Championships, coming eighth in 2007 and fifth in 2011.

She also occasionally competes in cross country running and was third at the 2011 Cross Internacional de la Constitución.

== International competitions ==
| Year | Competition | Venue | Position | Event | Notes |
Representing Spain
| 1999 | World Youth Championships | Bydgoszcz, Poland | 22nd (h) | 1500 m | 4:51.56 |
| 2007 | World Championships | Osaka, Japan | 10th (sf) | 1500 m | 4:20.44 |
| 2008 | Olympic Games | Beijing, China | 13th (h) | 5000 m | 15:31.22 |
| 2008 | Ibero-American Championships | Iquique, Chile | 1st | 3000 m | 9:16.53 |
| 2009 | European Team Championships | Leiria, Portugal | 1st | 5000 m | 15:28.87 |
| 2011 | European Indoor Championships | Paris, France | 4th | 3000 m | 9:02.18 |
| 2013 | World Championships | Moscow, Russia | 10th | 5000 m | 15:30.42 |
