= Mario Forsythe =

Jamaican sprinter

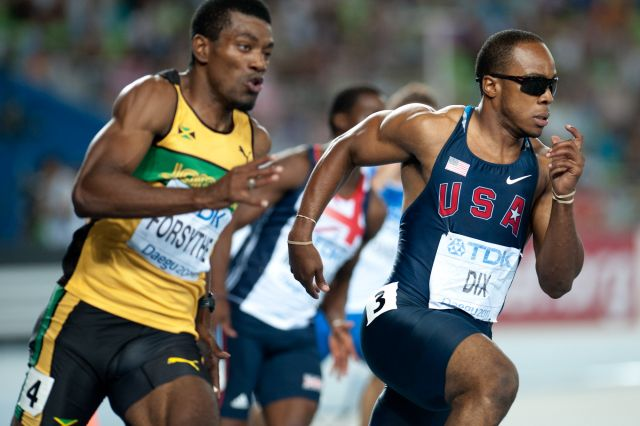
- Mario Forsythe (left) and Walter Dix during 2011 World Championships in Athletics in Daegu

Personal information
- Nationality: Jamaica
- Born: 30 October 1985 (age 40)

Sport
- Sport: Running
- Event(s): 100 metres, 200 metres

Achievements and titles
- Personal best(s): 100 m: 9.95 s (Rieti 2010); 200 m: 20.29 s (Reims 2011)

Mario Forsythe (born 30 October 1985) is a Jamaican sprinter who specialises in the 100 and 200 metres. He ran a 9.95 in Rieti, Italy, in August 2010, becoming the 74th runner to break the 10-second barrier.

== Personal best ==
Distance	Time	venue
100 m	9.95 s	Rieti, Italy (29 August 2010)
200 m	20.29 s	Reims, France (5 July 2011)
