= Athletics at the 2012 Summer Olympics – Men's pole vault =

Men's pole vault at the Games of the XXX Olympiad
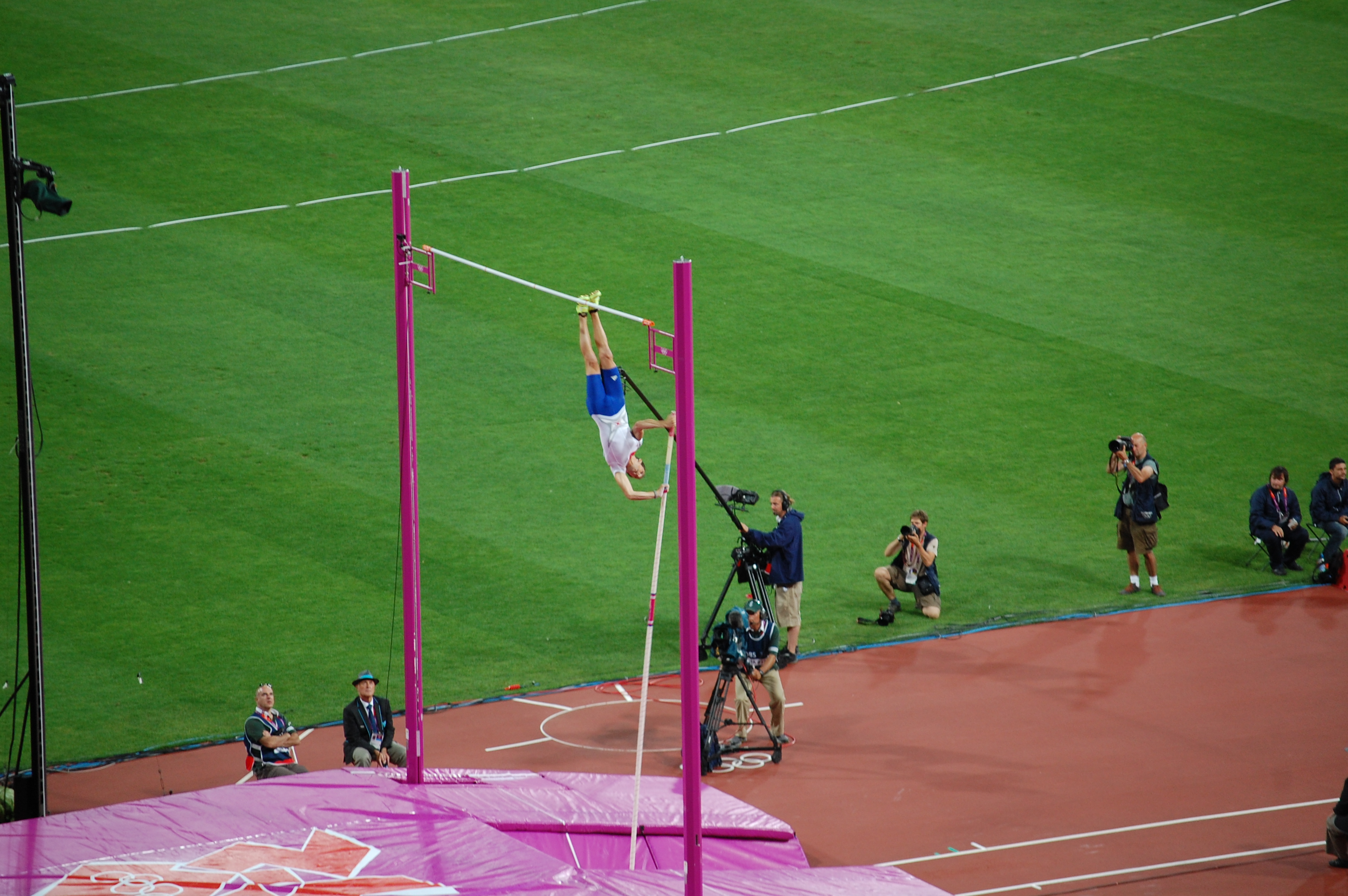
- Venue: Olympic Stadium
- Date: 8–10 August
- Competitors: 32 from 23 nations
- Winning height: 5.97 OR

Medalists
1st place, gold medalist(s)		Renaud Lavillenie; France
2nd place, silver medalist(s)		Björn Otto; Germany
3rd place, bronze medalist(s)		Raphael Holzdeppe; Germany

Official Video Highlights

The men's pole vault was a competition at the 2012 Summer Olympics in London, United Kingdom. The event was held at the Olympic Stadium on 8–10 August. Thirty-two athletes from 23 nations competed. The event was won by Renaud Lavillenie of France, the nation's first victory in the event since 1996 and third overall. Björn Otto and Raphael Holzdeppe of Germany took silver and bronze, respectively; like France, it was the first time since 1996 that Germany reached the men's pole vault podium.

== Summary ==
Nobody took an attempt at the auto-qualifying mark. As it turned out, it took a clean round through 5.50 to make the final.

Four of the 14 finalists only cleared 5.50. Four passed to 5.65 where defending champion, oft injured Steven Hooker and former world champion Brad Walker failed to clear their opening height. The medals were decided at 5.85, Renaud Lavillenie clearing on his first attempt, Björn Otto on the second and Raphael Holzdeppe on his third. The two Germans cleared 5.91 on their first attempt, while Lavillenie missed. So Lavillenie strategically passed to 5.97. On his second attempt, it was all or nothing. Lavillenie cleared it cleanly. In silver medal position on fewer misses, Otto passed to hope for a miracle at 6.02 while Holzdeppe failed at 5.97 and took the bronze. Otto's attempt at 6.02 was close but a failure. With the gold in hand Lavillenie took his remaining couple of attempts at 6.07.

During one part of the competition, Cuban Lázaro Borges was attempting to mark 5.35 metres when his pole broke into three large pieces (and at least two small ones). The incident has been used in several Olympic bloopers videos.

== Background ==
This was the 27th appearance of the event, which is one of 12 athletics events to have been held at every Summer Olympics. The top five finalists from the 2008 Games returned: gold medalist Steven Hooker of Australia, silver medalist Yevgeny Lukyanenko of Russia, bronze medalist (later stripped) Denys Yurchenko of Ukraine, fourth-place finisher (later upgraded to bronze medalist) Derek Miles of the United States, and fifth-place finisher Dmitry Starodubtsev of Russia. Other returning finalists were Raphael Holzdeppe of Germany and Jan Kudlička of the Czech Republic. Renaud Lavillenie of France had taken third at the last two world championships and was favored to win, over reigning world champion Paweł Wojciechowski of Poland.

Croatia made its men's pole vaulting debut. The United States made its 26th appearance, most of any nation, having missed only the boycotted 1980 Games.

== Qualification ==
A National Olympic Committee (NOC) could enter up to 3 qualified athletes in the men's pole vault event if all athletes met the A standard, or 1 athlete if they met the B standard. The maximum number of athletes per nation had been set at 3 since the 1930 Olympic Congress. The qualifying height standards could be obtained in various meets during the qualifying period that had the approval of the IAAF. Both outdoor and indoor meets were eligible. The A standard for the 2012 men's pole vault was 5.72 metres; the B standard was 5.60 metres. The qualifying period for was from 1 May 2011 to 8 July 2012. NOCs could also have an athlete enter the pole vault through a universality place. NOCs could enter one male athlete in an athletics event, regardless of height, if they had no male athletes meeting the qualifying A or B standards in any men's athletic event.

== Competition format ==
The competition consisted of two rounds, qualification and final. In qualification, each athlete had three attempts at each height and was eliminated if he failed to clear any height. Athletes who successfully jumped the qualifying height moved on the final. If fewer than 12 reached that height, the best 12 moved on. Cleared heights reset for the final, which followed the same three-attempts-per-height format until all athletes reached a height they could not jump.

== Records ==
Prior to this competition, the existing world and Olympic records were as follows:

World record	Sergey Bubka (UKR)	6.14	Sestriere, Italy	31 July 1994
Olympic record	Steven Hooker (AUS)	5.96	Beijing, China	22 August 2008

2012 World leading	Renaud Lavillenie (FRA)	5.97 m	Helsinki, Finland	1 July 2012

Renaud Lavillenie cleared 5.97 metres to win the gold medal and set a new Olympic record.

== Schedule ==
All times are British Summer Time (UTC+1)

Date	Time	Round
Wednesday, 8 August 2012	10:00	Qualifying
Friday, 10 August 2012	19:00	Finals

== Results ==
Key

- o = Height cleared
- x = Height failed
- – = Height passed
- r = Retired
- SB = Season's best
- PB = Personal best
- NR = National record
- AR = Area record
- OR = Olympic record
- WR = World record
- WL = World lead
- NM = No mark
- DNS = Did not start
- DQ = Disqualified

=== Qualifying round ===
Qual. rule: qualification standard 5.70m (Q) or at least best 12 (q) qualified.

Rank	Group	Athlete	Nation	5.20	5.35	5.50	5.60	5.65	Height	Notes
1	B	Raphael Holzdeppe	Germany	–	–	–	xo	o	5.65	q
1	B	Renaud Lavillenie	France	–	–	xo	—	o	5.65	q
3	A	Konstadinos Filippidis	Greece	–	o	o	o	—	5.60	q
4	A	Yevgeny Lukyanenko	Russia	–	–	xxo	o	—	5.60	q
4	A	Romain Mesnil	France	–	xo	o	xo	—	5.60	q
4	B	Brad Walker	United States	–	–	xxo	o	—	5.60	q
~~7~~	B	Dmitry Starodubtsev	Russia	–	xo	xo	xo	—	~~5.60~~	q, DPG
8	A	Łukasz Michalski	Poland	–	xo	xxo	xo	—	5.60	q
9	B	Igor Bychkov	Spain	o	—	o	xx-	x	5.50	q
9	A	Steve Hooker	Australia	—	—	o	—	—	5.50	q
9	B	Jan Kudlička	Czech Republic	–	o	o	—	—	5.50	q
9	A	Steven Lewis	Great Britain	–	–	o	—	—	5.50	q
9	A	Malte Mohr	Germany	—	—	o	—	—	5.50	q
9	A	Björn Otto	Germany	–	–	o	—	—	5.50	q
15	A	Jeremy Scott	United States	–	o	xo	xxx	—N/a	5.50	
16	B	Lázaro Borges	Cuba	–	xxo	xo	xxx	—N/a	5.50	
16	B	Sergey Kucheryanu	Russia	–	xxo	xo	xxx	—N/a	5.50	
18	B	Nikita Filippov	Kazakhstan	o	o	xxx	—N/a		5.35	
~~18~~	A	Maksym Mazuryk	Ukraine	—	o	xxx	—N/a		~~5.35~~	DPG
20	A	Ivan Horvat	Croatia	o	xo	xxx	—N/a		5.35	
20	B	Yang Yansheng	China	—	xo	xxx	—N/a		5.35	
22	B	Mareks Ārents	Latvia	xo	xo	xxx	—N/a		5.35	
~~23~~	B	Stanislau Tsivonchyk	Belarus	xo	xxx	—N/a			~~5.20~~	DPG
24	A	Edi Maia	Portugal	xxo	xxx	—N/a			5.20	
—	B	Jere Bergius	Finland	—	xxx	—N/a			No mark	
—	A	Fábio Gomes da Silva	Brazil	–	–	xxx	—N/a		No mark	
—	B	Alhaji Jeng	Sweden	—	xxx	—N/a			No mark	
—	A	Kim Yoo-Suk	South Korea	xxx	—N/a				No mark	
—	B	Derek Miles	United States	xxx	—N/a				No mark	
—	B	Paweł Wojciechowski	Poland	—	xxx	—N/a			No mark	
—	A	Seito Yamamoto	Japan	—	xxx	—N/a			No mark	
—	B	Denys Yurchenko	Ukraine	—	xxx	—N/a			No mark	

=== Final ===
Rank	Athlete	Nation	5.50	5.65	5.75	5.85	5.91	5.97	6.02	6.07	Height	Notes
1st place, gold medalist(s)	Renaud Lavillenie	France	–	o	o	o	x-	xo	x-	xx	5.97	OR
2nd place, silver medalist(s)	Björn Otto	Germany	o	o	xo	xo	o	xx-	x	—N/a	5.91	
3rd place, bronze medalist(s)	Raphael Holzdeppe	Germany	–	xo	xo	xxo	o	xxx	—N/a		5.91	PB
4	Steven Lewis	Great Britain	xo	–	xo	xxx	—N/a				5.75	
4	Yevgeny Lukyanenko	Russia	xo	–	xo	xxx	—N/a				5.75	SB
6	Konstadinos Filippidis	Greece	o	xo	xxx	—N/a					5.65	
7	Jan Kudlička	Czech Republic	o	xxo	xxx	—N/a					5.65	
8	Malte Mohr	Germany	o	–	xxx	—N/a					5.50	
8	Romain Mesnil	France	o	xxx	—N/a						5.50	
10	Łukasz Michalski	Poland	xo	xxx	—N/a						5.50	
11	Igor Bychkov	Spain	xxo	xxx	—N/a						5.50	
—	Brad Walker	United States	–	xxx	—N/a						No mark	
—	Steve Hooker	Australia	–	xxx	—N/a						No mark	
—	Dmitry Starodubtsev	Russia	o	xo	o	xxx	—N/a				~~5.75~~	DPG
