= 2008 IAAF World Indoor Championships – Men's pole vault =

== Medalists ==
Gold
Evgeniy Lukyanenko	Russia
Silver
Brad Walker	United States
Bronze
Steven Hooker	Australia

== Qualification ==
Qualification rule: qualification standard 5.70m or at least best 8 qualified

Pos	Athlete	Country	Mark	Q	Attempts				
Pos	Athlete	Country	Mark	Q	5.35	5.45	5.55	5.65	5.70
1	Tim Lobinger	Germany	5.70	Q	-	-	O	-	O
2	Brad Walker	United States	5.70 SB	Q	-	-	O	-	XO
3	Jérôme Clavier	France	5.70	Q	XO	-	O	O	XO
3	Derek Miles	United States	5.70	Q	-	O	XO	O	XO
3	Steven Hooker	Australia	5.70 SB	Q	-	O	-	X-	XO
6	Maksym Mazuryk	Ukraine	5.70	Q	-	-	XO	XO	XO
7	Evgeniy Lukyanenko	Russia	5.70	Q	-	O	-	O	XXO
8	Alhaji Jeng	Sweden	5.65	q	-	O	-	O	XXX
9	Giovanni Lanaro	Mexico	5.65 SB		-	XO	-	O	XXX
10	Daichi Sawano	Japan	5.65 SB		-	XO	O	XXO	XXX
11	Pavel Gerasimov	Russia	5.55		-	XO	O	XXX	
12	Feiliang Liu	China	5.55		O	-	XXO	XXX	
13	Renaud Lavillenie	France	5.55		XO	-	XXO	XXX	
14	Leonid Andreev	Uzbekistan	5.45 PB		XO	O	XXX		
15	Steven Lewis	United Kingdom	5.35		O	-	XXX		
16	Denys Yurchenko	Ukraine	5.35		XXO	-	XXX		
	Fábio Gomes da Silva	Brazil	NM		XXX				
	Fabian Schulze	Germany	NM		-	XXX			
	Jesper Fritz	Sweden	NM		XXX				
	Spas Bukhalov	Bulgaria	NM		-	-	XXX		
	Aleksandr Averbukh	Israel	DNS						

== Final ==
Pos	Athlete	Country	Mark	Attempts									
Pos	Athlete	Country	Mark	5.45	5.55	5.60	5.65	5.70	5.75	5.80	5.85	5.90	5.95
Gold medal	Evgeniy Lukyanenko	Russia	5.90 WL	-	O	-	-	O	O	O	XO	O	XXX
Silver medal	Brad Walker	United States	5.85 PB	-	-	-	-	XO	-	-	O	-	XXX
Bronze medal	Steven Hooker	Australia	5.80 SB	-	O	-	-	O	-	O	X-	XX	
4	Jérôme Clavier	France	5.75	O	-	O	-	O	O	XXX			
5	Tim Lobinger	Germany	5.70	-	O	-	-	O	-	XXX			
6	Maksym Mazuryk	Ukraine	5.70	-	XO	-	-	O	-	XXX			
7	Alhaji Jeng	Sweden	5.70	-	-	O	-	XO	-	XXX			
8	Derek Miles	United States	5.60	-	XX-	O	-	X-	-	XX			
