= 2006 IAAF World Indoor Championships – Men's pole vault =

The Men's pole vault event at the 2006 IAAF World Indoor Championships was held on March 11–12.

== Medalists ==
Gold	Silver	Bronze
Brad Walker; United States	Alhaji Jeng; Sweden	Tim Lobinger; Germany

== Results ==
=== Qualification ===
Qualification: Qualification Performance 5.70 (Q) or at least 8 best performers advanced to the final.

Rank	Athlete	Nationality	5.45	5.55	5.60	5.65	5.70	Result	Notes
1.	Jeff Hartwig	United States	–	xo	–	o	o	5.70	Q
2.	Brad Walker	United States	–	–	xo	xo	o	5.70	Q
3.	Denys Yurchenko	Ukraine	–	xxo	–	xx–	o	5.70	Q, SB
4.	Aleksandr Averbukh	Israel	–	xo	–	xxo	xo	5.70	Q
5.	Tim Lobinger	Germany	–	o	–	o	xxx	5.65	q
5.	Fabian Schulze	Germany	–	o	–	o	xxx	5.65	q
7.	Giovanni Lanaro	Mexico	o	xo	–	o	xxx	5.65	q
8.	Alhaji Jeng	Sweden	–	xxo	–	o	xx–	5.65	q
9.	Daichi Sawano	Japan	o	xo	xo	xo	xxx	5.65	SB
10.	Przemysław Czerwiński	Poland	xxo	xo	o	xxo	xxx	5.65	
11.	Kevin Rans	Belgium	xo	–	o	xxx		5.60	
12.	Igor Pavlov	Russia	xxo	xo	x–	xx		5.55	
13.	Dmitry Starodubtsev	Russia	xo	xxo	xx–	x		5.55	
14.	Spas Bukhalov	Bulgaria	o	–	xxx			5.45	
14.	Jérôme Clavier	France	o	xxx				5.45	
14.	Maksym Mazuryk	Ukraine	o	xxx				5.45	
14.	Laurens Looije	Netherlands	o	xxx				5.45	
	Giuseppe Gibilisco	Italy	–	xxx				NM	
	Liu Feiliang	China	xxx					NM	
	Romain Mesnil	France	–	xxx				NM	

=== Final ===
Rank	Athlete	Nationality	5.50	5.60	5.65	5.70	5.75	5.80	5.90	Result	Notes
1st place, gold medalist(s)	Brad Walker	United States	–	xo	–	o	–	xxo	x–	5.80	SB
2nd place, silver medalist(s)	Alhaji Jeng	Sweden	–	o	–	o	–	xxx		5.70	
3rd place, bronze medalist(s)	Tim Lobinger	Germany	–	o	–	xx–	x			5.60	
4	Aleksandr Averbukh	Israel	o	–	xxx					5.50	
4	Fabian Schulze	Germany	o	–	xxx					5.50	
4	Giovanni Lanaro	Mexico	o	xxx						5.50	
	Denys Yurchenko	Ukraine	–	xxx						NM	
	Jeff Hartwig	United States	–	xxx						NM	
