= Athletics at the 2008 Summer Olympics – Men's pole vault =

Men's pole vault at the Games of the XXIX Olympiad
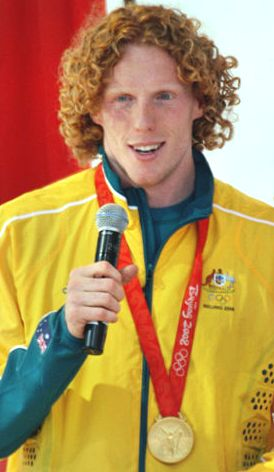
- Steven Hooker
- Venue: Beijing National Stadium
- Dates: 20 August 2008 (qualifying); 22 August 2008 (final)
- Competitors: 38 from 25 nations
- Winning height: 5.96 OR

Medalists
1st place, gold medalist(s)		Steven Hooker; Australia
2nd place, silver medalist(s)		Yevgeny Lukyanenko; Russia
3rd place, bronze medalist(s)		Derek Miles; United States

The men's pole vault at the 2008 Summer Olympics took place on 20 and 22 August at the Beijing National Stadium. Thirty-eight athletes from 25 nations competed. The event was won by Steven Hooker of Australia, the nation's first medal in the men's pole vault. Russia took its third medal of the four Games since competing independently; including Russian vaulters for the Soviet Union and Unified Team, Russians had taken six medals in the last six Games. The bronze medal initially went to Denys Yurchenko of Ukraine, but was later stripped from him for doping offenses and reassigned to fourth-place finisher Derek Miles of the United States.

== Summary ==
Eight men were still in the competition at 5.70m. Yevgeny Lukyanenko and Denys Yurchenko cleared it on their first attempt. Derek Miles and Dmitry Starodubtsev cleared on their second, but Miles had the advantage because Starodubtsev took two additional attempts at 5.45m. Danny Ecker made it on his last attempt. Yurchenko would take no more attempts. Igor Pavlov passed to 5.75m and Steven Hooker continued to pass having only taken one jump in the entire competition. Only Ecker and Pavlov chose to jump at 5.75m, neither of them making it. At 5.80m, Lukyanenko was the only one to make it on his first attempt to take the lead. Miles and Starodubtsev couldn't clear the bar, but Hooker made his final attempt. At 5.85m, neither man made their first two attempts but each made their final attempt to advance to 5.90m. Again neither could clear on their first two attempts. On his final attempt, Hooker peaked in front of the bar, but was able to jackknife over the bar to make the clearance. On his final attempt, Lukyanenko brushed the bar off giving Hooker the gold. But the show wasn't over as Hooker had the bar raised to 5.96 m (19 ft 6 1/2 in) for a new Olympic record. For the fourth height in a row, Hooker missed his first two attempts, but sailed cleanly over the bar on his final attempt. After 13 attempts in the competition, Hooker stood in the middle of the pit and flexed his muscles. More than eight years after the competition, Yurchenko's doping sample was retested and he was found to have dehydrochlormethyltestosterone in his system. Yurchenko was disqualified, giving Miles a delayed bronze medal.

== Background ==
This was the 26th appearance of the event, which is one of 12 athletics events to have been held at every Summer Olympics. The returning finalists from the 2004 Games were bronze medalist Giuseppe Gibilisco of Italy, fourth-place finisher Igor Pavlov of Russia, fifth-place finisher Danny Ecker of Germany, seventh-place finisher Derek Miles of the United States, eighth-place finisher Aleksandr Averbukh of Israel, ninth-place finisher Denys Yurchenko of Ukraine, eleventh-place finishers Paul Burgess of Australia and Tim Lobinger of Germany, thirteenth-place finisher Daichi Sawano of Japan, and sixteenth-place finisher Oleksandr Korchmid of Ukraine. Gibilisco, Ecker, Averbukh, and Lobinger had each been in the 2000 finals as well. Brad Walker of the United States was the reigning world champion.

Uzbekistan made its men's pole vaulting debut after entering a vaulter in 2004 who did not start. The United States made its 25th appearance, most of any nation, having missed only the boycotted 1980 Games.

== Qualification ==
The qualifying standards were 5.70 m (18.7 ft) (A standard) and 5.55 m (18.21 ft) (B standard). Each National Olympic Committee (NOC) was able to enter up to three entrants providing they had met the A standard in the qualifying period (1 January 2007 to 23 July 2008). NOCs were also permitted to enter one athlete providing he had met the B standard in the same qualifying period. The maximum number of athletes per nation had been set at 3 since the 1930 Olympic Congress.

== Competition format ==
The competition used the two-round format introduced in 1912, with results cleared between rounds. Vaulters received three attempts at each height. Ties were broken by the countback rule.

In the qualifying round, the bar was set at 5.15 metres, 5.30 metres, 5.45 metres, 5.55 metres, and 5.65 metres. The next step would have been 5.75 metres, but no vaulters attempted that height (as only 13 cleared 5.65 metres, the qualifying was stopped there rather than trying to eliminate 1 vaulter). All vaulters clearing 5.75 metres advanced to the final. If fewer than 12 cleared that height, the top 12 (including ties, after applying the countback rules) advanced.

In the final, the bar was set at 5.45 metres, 5.60 metres, 5.70 metres, and then increasing by 5 centimetres at a time (with the winner, after clearing 5.90 metres, attempting at 5.96 metres rather than 5.95 metres, trying for a new Olympic record).

== Records ==
Prior to this competition, the existing world and Olympic records were as follows:

World record	Sergey Bubka (UKR)	6.14	Sestriere, Italy	31 July 1994
Olympic record	Timothy Mack (USA)	5.95	Athens, Greece	27 August 2004

Steven Hooker won the competition at 5.90 metres, then took three attempts at 5.96 metres in an effort to break the Olympic record. On the third try, he was successful.

== Schedule ==
All times are China Standard Time (UTC+8)

Date	Time	Round
Wednesday, 20 August 2008	20:40	Qualifying
Friday, 22 August 2008	19:55	Final

== Results ==
Key

- o = Height cleared
- x = Height failed
- – = Height passed
- r = Retired
- SB = Season's best
- PB = Personal best
- NR = National record
- AR = Area record
- OR = Olympic record
- WR = World record
- WL = World lead
- NM = No mark
- DNS = Did not start
- DQ = Disqualified

=== Qualifying round ===
Qualifying performance 5.75 (Q) or at least 12 best performers (q) advance to the final.

Rank	Group	Athlete	Nation	5.15	5.30	5.45	5.55	5.65	Height	Notes
1	B	Yevgeniy Lukyanenko	Russia	—	—	—	o	o	5.65	q
1	A	Igor Pavlov	Russia	—	—	o	—	o	5.65	q
3	A	Leonid Andreev	Uzbekistan	—	o	o	o	xo	5.65	q, =PB
3	A	Jérôme Clavier	France	—	o	—	o	xo	5.65	q
3	A	Raphael Holzdeppe	Germany	—	—	o	o	xo	5.65	q
~~3~~	A	Denys Yurchenko	Ukraine	—	—	o	—	xo	~~5.65~~	q, DPG
7	B	Przemysław Czerwiński	Poland	—	—	o	xo	xo	5.65	q
7	A	Jan Kudlička	Czech Republic	o	o	—	xo	xo	5.65	q
9	B	Danny Ecker	Germany	—	—	xxo	—	xo	5.65	q
9	B	Derek Miles	United States	—	—	o	xxo	xo	5.65	q
11	A	Dmitry Starodubtsev	Russia	—	xo	—	xxo	xo	5.65	q
12	B	Steven Hooker	Australia	—	—	—	—	xxo	5.65	q
13	B	Giuseppe Gibilisco	Italy	—	—	xo	o	xxo	5.65	q, SB
14	B	Alhaji Jeng	Sweden	—	—	—	o	xxx	5.55	
14	B	Romain Mesnil	France	—	—	—	o	xxx	5.55	
16	A	Paul Burgess	Australia	—	—	o	xo	xxx	5.55	
16	B	Tim Lobinger	Germany	—	—	o	xo	xxx	5.55	
16	A	Maksym Mazuryk	Ukraine	—	—	o	xo	xxx	5.55	
16	B	Daichi Sawano	Japan	—	—	o	xo	xxx	5.55	
20	A	Jeff Hartwig	United States	—	—	o	xxo	xxx	5.55	
20	A	Liu Feiliang	China	—	o	o	xxo	xxx	5.55	
22	B	Oleksandr Korchmid	Ukraine	—	—	o	xxx	—	5.45	
22	B	Mikko Latvala	Finland	—	—	o	—	xxx	5.45	
24	A	Jesper Fritz	Sweden	—	xo	o	xxx	—	5.45	
25	B	Spas Bukhalov	Bulgaria	—	—	xo	—	xxx	5.45	
25	B	Fábio Gomes da Silva	Brazil	—	—	xo	xxx	—	5.45	
25	A	Giovanni Lanaro	Mexico	—	—	xo	xxx	—	5.45	
28	B	Aleksandr Averbukh	Israel	—	—	xxo	—	xxx	5.45	
28	B	Kevin Rans	Belgium	—	o	xxo	xxx	—	5.45	
30	B	Štěpán Janáček	Czech Republic	o	o	—	xxx	—	5.30	
30	B	Dominic Johnson	Saint Lucia	—	o	xxx	—		5.30	
32	A	Jurij Rovan	Slovenia	xx-	o	xxx	—		5.30	
—	B	Lázaro Borges	Cuba	—	xxx	—			No mark	
—	A	Germán Chiaraviglio	Argentina	—	xxx	—			No mark	
—	A	Iliyan Efremov	Bulgaria	xxx	—				No mark	
—	A	Kim Yoo-Suk	South Korea	—	xxx	—			No mark	
—	A	Steven Lewis	Great Britain	—	—	xxx	—		No mark	
—	A	Brad Walker	United States	—	—	—	—	xxx	No mark	

=== Final ===
The final was held on Friday, 22 August 2008. Denys Yurchenko of Ukraine originally finished third, but in November 2016, it was announced that he tested positive for dehydrochlormethyltestosterone.

Rank	Athlete	Nation	5.45	5.60	5.70	5.75	5.80	5.85	5.90	5.96	Height	Notes
1st place, gold medalist(s)	Steven Hooker	Australia	—	o	—	—	xxo	xxo	xxo	xxo	5.96	OR
2nd place, silver medalist(s)	Yevgeny Lukyanenko	Russia	—	xxo	o	—	o	xxo	xxx	—	5.85	
3rd place, bronze medalist(s)	Derek Miles	United States	o	xxo	xo	—	xxx	—			5.70	
4	Dmitry Starodubtsev	Russia	xxo	xxo	xo	—	xxx	—			5.70	
5	Danny Ecker	Germany	xo	—	xxo	xxx	—				5.70	
6	Jérôme Clavier	France	xo	o	xxx	—					5.60	
7	Raphael Holzdeppe	Germany	o	xo	xxx	—					5.60	
8	Igor Pavlov	Russia	—	xxo	—	xxx	—				5.60	
9	Jan Kudlička	Czech Republic	o	xxx	—						5.45	
10	Przemysław Czerwiński	Poland	xo	xxx	—						5.45	
—	Giuseppe Gibilisco	Italy	xxx	—							NM	
—	Leonid Andreev	Uzbekistan	xxx	—							NM	
~~3~~	Denys Yurchenko	Ukraine	xxo	xo	o	—					~~5.70~~	DPG
