= 2000 World Junior Championships in Athletics – Men's pole vault =

The men's pole vault event at the 2000 World Junior Championships in Athletics was held in Santiago, Chile, at Estadio Nacional Julio Martínez Prádanos on 21 and 22 October.

== Medalists ==
Gold	Aleksey Khanafin; Russia
Silver	Aleksandr Korchmyd; Ukraine
Bronze	Rocky Danners; United States

== Results ==
=== Final ===
22 October

Rank	Name	Nationality	Result	Notes
1st place, gold medalist(s)	Aleksey Khanafin	Russia	5.30	
2nd place, silver medalist(s)	Aleksandr Korchmyd	Ukraine	5.30	
3rd place, bronze medalist(s)	Rocky Danners	United States	5.20	
4	Steve Hooker	Australia	5.20	
5	Toshio Imura	Japan	5.20	
6	Vasiliy Petrov	Russia	5.20	
7	Shunsuke Shimo	Japan	5.20	
8	Kevin Rans	Belgium	5.00	
8	Alhaji Jeng	Sweden	5.00	
10	Alberto Martínez	Spain	5.00	
10	Paweł Szczyrba	Poland	5.00	
12	Teemu Juhola	Finland	5.00	
	Rico Tepper	Germany	NH	

=== Qualifications ===
21 October

==== Group A ====
Rank	Name	Nationality	Result	Notes
1	Aleksandr Korchmyd	Ukraine	5.10	q
2	Kevin Rans	Belgium	5.10	q
3	Paweł Szczyrba	Poland	5.10	q
4	Vasiliy Petrov	Russia	5.10	q
4	Rocky Danners	United States	5.10	q
6	Steve Hooker	Australia	5.10	q
7	Shunsuke Shimo	Japan	5.10	q
8	Mikael Westö	Finland	5.00	
9	Robert Villa	Spain	5.00	
10	Fílippos Sgoúros	Greece	5.00	
11	Jordhy Carpentier	France	4.80	
12	Marcelo Terra	Argentina	4.80	
	Fredrik Skoglund	Sweden	NH	

==== Group B ====
Rank	Name	Nationality	Result	Notes
1	Toshio Imura	Japan	5.10	q
1	Aleksey Khanafin	Russia	5.10	q
3	Alberto Martínez	Spain	5.10	q
4	Alhaji Jeng	Sweden	5.10	q
5	Teemu Juhola	Finland	5.10	q
5	Rico Tepper	Germany	5.10	q
7	James Johnson	Canada	5.00	
8	Rafal Erdmanski	Poland	5.00	
9	Mários Evangélou	Greece	4.80	
10	José Francisco Nava	Chile	4.80	
11	Sébastien Homo	France	4.80	
12	Kim Yu-Seok	South Korea	4.80	
	Patrick Jesser	Australia	NH	
	Ivan Bonchev	Bulgaria	NH	

== Participation ==
According to an unofficial count, 27 athletes from 18 countries participated in the event.

- Argentina (1)
- Australia (2)
- Belgium (1)
- Bulgaria (1)
- Canada (1)
- Chile (1)
- Finland (2)
- France (2)
- Germany (1)
- Greece (2)
- Japan (2)
- Poland (2)
- Russia (2)
- South Korea (1)
- Spain (2)
- Sweden (2)
- Ukraine (1)
- United States (1)
