= 2004 World Junior Championships in Athletics – Men's pole vault =

The men's pole vault event at the 2004 World Junior Championships in Athletics was held in Grosseto, Italy, at Stadio Olimpico Carlo Zecchini on 15 and 17 July.

== Medalists ==
Gold	Dmitry Starodubtsev; Russia
Silver	Germán Chiaraviglio; Argentina
Bronze	Liu Feiliang; China

== Results ==
=== Final ===
17 July

Rank	Name	Nationality	Result	Notes
1st place, gold medalist(s)	Dmitry Starodubtsev	Russia	5.50	
2nd place, silver medalist(s)	Germán Chiaraviglio	Argentina	5.45	
3rd place, bronze medalist(s)	Liu Feiliang	China	5.40	
4	Konstadínos Filippídis	Greece	5.35	
5	Jesper Fritz	Sweden	5.25	
6	Benjamin Renaudeau	France	5.20	
7	Chip Heuser	United States	5.20	
8	Charles Andureu	France	5.20	
9	Steve Lewis	United Kingdom	5.00	
10	Naoya Kawaguchi	Japan	5.00	
11	Björn Venghaus	Germany	4.90	
	Denys Fedas	Ukraine	NH	

=== Qualifications ===
15 July

==== Group A ====
Rank	Name	Nationality	Result	Notes
1	Benjamin Renaudeau	France	5.05	q
2	Germán Chiaraviglio	Argentina	5.05	q
2	Konstadínos Filippídis	Greece	5.05	q
2	Dmitry Starodubtsev	Russia	5.05	q
1	Chip Heuser	United States	5.05	q
6	Naoya Kawaguchi	Japan	5.05	q
7	Liu Feiliang	China	5.05	q
8	José Montano	Mexico	4.95	
8	Johan Carlsson	Sweden	4.95	
10	Michael Konow	Germany	4.95	
11	Manuel González	Spain	4.65	

==== Group B ====
Rank	Name	Nationality	Result	Notes
1	Jesper Fritz	Sweden	5.05	q
2	Björn Venghaus	Germany	5.05	q
3	Denys Fedas	Ukraine	5.05	q
4	Charles Andureu	France	5.05	q
4	Steve Lewis	United Kingdom	5.05	q
6	Mikhail Golovtsov	Russia	4.95	
	Bernat Vilella	Andorra	NH	
	Stanislau Tsivonchyk	Belarus	NH	
	Brandon Glenn	United States	NH	

== Participation ==
According to an unofficial count, 20 athletes from 15 countries participated in the event.

- Andorra (1)
- Argentina (1)
- Belarus (1)
- China (1)
- France (2)
- Germany (2)
- Greece (1)
- Japan (1)
- Mexico (1)
- Russia (2)
- Spain (1)
- Sweden (2)
- Ukraine (1)
- United Kingdom (1)
- United States (2)
