= 2007 World Championships in Athletics – Men's pole vault =

The Men's Pole Vault event at the 2007 World Championships in Athletics took place on August 30, 2007 (qualification) and 1 September 2007 (final) at the Nagai Stadium in Osaka, Japan.

== Medallists ==
| Gold | Brad Walker; United States (USA) |
| Silver | Romain Mesnil; France (FRA) |
| Bronze | Danny Ecker; Germany (GER) |

== Records ==
| World Record | Sergey Bubka (UKR) | 6.14 | Sestriere, Italy | 31 July 1994 |
| Championship Record | Dmitri Markov (AUS) | 6.05 | Edmonton, Canada | 9 August 2001 |

== Results ==
=== Qualification ===
Qualification: Qualifying Performance 5.75 (Q) or at least 12 best performers (q) advance to the final.

| Rank | Group | Name | Nationality | 5.40 | 5.55 | 5.65 | 5.70 | Result | Notes |
|---|---|---|---|---|---|---|---|---|---|
| 1 | A | Danny Ecker | Germany | – | o | – | o | 5.70 | q |
| 1 | A | Steven Hooker | Australia | – | o | – | o | 5.70 | q |
| 1 | A | Igor Pavlov | Russia | – | o | o | o | 5.70 | q |
| 4 | A | Yevgeniy Lukyanenko | Russia | o | o | xo | o | 5.70 | q, PB |
| 4 | B | Denys Yurchenko | Ukraine | – | xo | – | o | 5.70 | q |
| 6 | B | Tim Lobinger | Germany | – | xxo | – | o | 5.70 | q |
| 7 | A | Brad Walker | United States | – | o | – | xo | 5.70 | q |
| 7 | A | Romain Mesnil | France | – | o | – | xo | 5.70 | q |
| 9 | A | Maksym Mazuryk | Ukraine | xo | o | o | xo | 5.70 | q, SB |
| 9 | B | Björn Otto | Germany | – | xo | – | xo | 5.70 | q |
| 11 | B | Aleksandr Averbukh | Israel | – | o | o | – | 5.65 | q |
| 12 | A | Fábio Gomes da Silva | Brazil | xo | xxo | o | xxx | 5.65 | q |
| 13 | A | Liu Feiliang | China | o | xxo | xo | xxx | 5.65 | |
| 14 | A | Spas Bukhalov | Bulgaria | – | o | xxo | xxx | 5.65 | |
| 15 | A | Alhaji Jeng | Sweden | – | o | xxx | | 5.55 | |
| 15 | B | Jeff Hartwig | United States | o | o | xxx | | 5.55 | |
| 15 | B | Jacob Pauli | United States | – | o | – | xxx | 5.55 | |
| 18 | A | Germán Chiaraviglio | Argentina | xxo | o | xxx | | 5.55 | |
| 19 | B | Michal Balner | Czech Republic | xo | xo | xxx | | 5.55 | |
| 20 | B | Jérôme Clavier | France | xo | xxo | xxx | | 5.55 | |
| 21 | A | Andrej Poljanec | Slovenia | o | – | x | | 5.40 | |
| 21 | A | Kevin Rans | Belgium | o | xxx | | | 5.40 | |
| 21 | B | Paul Burgess | Australia | o | – | xxx | | 5.40 | |
| 21 | B | Oleksandr Korchmid | Ukraine | o | xxx | | | 5.40 | |
| 25 | B | Damiel Dossévi | France | xo | xxx | | | 5.40 | |
| | A | Robinson Pratt | Mexico | xxx | | | | NM | |
| | B | Giovanni Lanaro | Mexico | xxx | | | | NM | |
| | B | Pavel Prokopenko | Russia | xxx | | | | NM | |
| | B | Steven Lewis | Great Britain | xxx | | | | NM | |
| | B | Leonid Andreev | Uzbekistan | xxx | | | | NM | |
| | B | Daichi Sawano | Japan | – | xx– | x | | NM | |

=== Final ===
| Rank | Name | Nationality | 5.51 | 5.66 | 5.76 | 5.81 | 5.86 | 5.91 | Result | Notes |
|---|---|---|---|---|---|---|---|---|---|---|
| 1st place, gold medalist(s) | Brad Walker | United States | o | o | x– | o | o | xxx | 5.86 | |
| 2nd place, silver medalist(s) | Romain Mesnil | France | – | xo | – | o | xo | xxx | 5.86 | |
| 3rd place, bronze medalist(s) | Danny Ecker | Germany | o | o | – | o | x– | xx | 5.81 | |
| 4 | Igor Pavlov | Russia | xo | o | x– | o | xxx | | 5.81 | PB |
| 5 | Björn Otto | Germany | o | o | – | xo | – | xxx | 5.81 | |
| 6 | Yevgeniy Lukyanenko | Russia | xo | o | o | xo | xxx | | 5.81 | PB |
| 7 | Aleksandr Averbukh | Israel | – | o | – | xxo | – | xxx | 5.81 | SB |
| 8 | Tim Lobinger | Germany | o | o | xo | xxo | xxx | | 5.81 | |
| 9 | Steven Hooker | Australia | o | – | o | – | xx– | x | 5.76 | |
| 10 | Fábio Gomes da Silva | Brazil | o | xo | o | xxx | | | 5.76 | |
| 11 | Maksym Mazuryk | Ukraine | o | xxo | xxo | xxx | | | 5.76 | PB |
| 12 | Denys Yurchenko | Ukraine | o | xxo | x– | xx | | | 5.66 | |
