= Athletics at the 2003 Summer Universiade – Men's pole vault =

The men's pole vault event at the 2003 Summer Universiade was held on 28 August in Daegu, South Korea.

== Results ==
Rank	Athlete	Nationality	4.80	5.00	5.10	5.20	5.30	5.40	5.50	5.60	5.65	5.70	5.75	5.80	Result	Notes
1st place, gold medalist(s)	Oleksandr Korchmid	Ukraine	–	–	–	o	–	o	o	o	xo	o	xo	xxx	5.75	
2nd place, silver medalist(s)	Igor Pavlov	Russia	–	–	–	xo	–	o	o	x–	xo	x–	xx		5.65	
3rd place, bronze medalist(s)	Björn Otto	Germany	–	–	–	o	–	o	o	xxx					5.50	
3rd place, bronze medalist(s)	Tiberiu Agoston	Romania	–	o	–	o	o	o	o	xxx					5.50	=NR
5	João André	Portugal	–	–	o	–	o	o	xxx						5.40	
6	Vesa Rantanen	Finland	–	–	–	–	xo	o	xxx						5.40	
7	Jérôme Clavier	France	–	o	–	o	o	xo	xxx						5.40	
8	Kim Yoo-suk	South Korea	–	–	–	o	xxo	xxx							5.30	
9	Fabio Pizzolato	Italy	–	–	–	xo	–	xxx							5.20	
10	Andrea Giannini	Italy	–	–	–	xxo	–	xxx							5.20	
11	Ashley Swain	Great Britain	–	–	xo	–	xxx								5.10	
11	Toni Latvala	Finland	–	–	xo	–	xxx								5.10	
11	Steve Hooker	Australia	–	–	xo	–	xxx								5.10	
14	José Francisco Nava	Chile	o	xo	xxx										5.00	
	Christian Sánchez	Mexico	–	xxx											NM	
	Luke Vedelago	Australia	–	–	xxx										NM	
