= 2007 European Athletics Indoor Championships – Men's pole vault =

The Men's pole vault event at the 2007 European Athletics Indoor Championships was held on March 2–3.

== Medalists ==
Gold	Silver	Bronze
Danny Ecker; Germany	Denys Yurchenko; Ukraine	Björn Otto; Germany

== Results ==
=== Qualification ===
Qualification: Qualification Performance 5.70 (Q) or at least 8 best performers advanced to the final.

Rank	Athlete	Nationality	5.20	5.40	5.55	5.65	5.70	Result	Notes
1	Björn Otto	Germany	–	–	o	–	o	5.70	Q
2	Danny Ecker	Germany	–	–	o	o		5.65	q
2	Oleksandr Korchmid	Ukraine	–	o	o	o		5.65	q
4	Tim Lobinger	Germany	–	–	xxo	o		5.65	q
5	Spas Bukhalov	Bulgaria	–	o	o	xo		5.65	q, SB
6	Denys Yurchenko	Ukraine	–	o	xo	xo		5.65	q, =SB
7	Dmitriy Starodubtsev	Russia	o	o	xxo	xxo	x–	5.65	q, =PB
8	Jérôme Clavier	France	–	xo	xxo	xxo	x–	5.65	q
9	Rens Blom	Netherlands	–	o	o	xxx		5.55	
9	Nicolas Guigon	France	o	o	o	xxx		5.55	
9	Igor Pavlov	Russia	–	o	o	xxx		5.55	
9	Adam Ptáček	Czech Republic	o	o	o	xxx		5.55	
13	Pavel Gerasimov	Russia	–	o	xo	xxx		5.55	
14	Ilian Efremov	Bulgaria	–	–	xxo	x–		5.55	
15	Steven Lewis	Great Britain	xo	xo	xxo	xx–	x	5.55	
16	Przemysław Czerwiński	Poland	–	o	xxx			5.40	
16	Adam Kolasa	Poland	o	o	xxx			5.40	
18	Andrej Poljanec	Slovenia	o	xxx				5.20	

=== Final ===
Rank	Athlete	Nationality	5.41	5.51	5.61	5.71	5.81	Result	Notes
1st place, gold medalist(s)	Danny Ecker	Germany	–	o	–	o	xxx	5.71	
2nd place, silver medalist(s)	Denys Yurchenko	Ukraine	–	xo	–	xo	xxx	5.71	SB
3rd place, bronze medalist(s)	Björn Otto	Germany	–	o	–	xxo	xxx	5.71	
4	Oleksandr Korchmid	Ukraine	–	o	–	xxx		5.51	
5	Tim Lobinger	Germany	–	xxo	–	xxx		5.51	
6	Spas Bukhalov	Bulgaria	o	–	xxx			5.41	
6	Jérôme Clavier	France	o	–	xxx			5.41	
6	Dmitriy Starodubtsev	Russia	o	xxx				5.41	
