= 2007 European Athletics U23 Championships – Men's pole vault =

The men's pole vault event at the 2007 European Athletics U23 Championships was held in Debrecen, Hungary, at Gyulai István Atlétikai Stadion on 13 and 15 July.

== Medalists ==
Gold	Pavel Prokopenko; Russia
Silver	Jesper Fritz; Sweden
Bronze	Denys Fedas; Ukraine

== Results ==
=== Final ===
15 July

Rank	Name	Nationality	Attempts											Result	Notes
Rank	Name	Nationality	5.10	5.20	5.30	5.40	5.50	5.55	5.60	5.65	5.70	5.75	5.80	Result	Notes
1st place, gold medalist(s)	Pavel Prokopenko	Russia	–	–	o	–	o	–	o	–	x–	xo	x	5.75	
2nd place, silver medalist(s)	Jesper Fritz	Sweden	–	–	xo	–	o	o	–	o	o	xx	x	5.70	
3rd place, bronze medalist(s)	Denys Fedas	Ukraine	–	o	–	o	x–	o	x–	xo	x–	xx		5.65	
4	Dmitriy Starodubtsev	Russia	o	–	o	–	o	–	o	–	xxx			5.60	
5	Tobias Scherbarth	Germany	–	o	–	o	o	x–	xo	xxx				5.60	
6	Sergey Kucheryanu	Russia	–	o	–	xxo	–	o	x–	xx				5.55	
7	Steven Lewis	United Kingdom	–	–	xo	–	xx-	o	–	xx–	x			5.55	
8	Wout van Wengerden	Netherlands	o	o	o	o	xxx							5.40	
9	Mateusz Didenkow	Poland	o	–	o	xxx								5.30	
10	Renaud Lavillenie	France	o	xxo	xo	xxx								5.30	
	Jere Bergius	Finland	xx–	x										NM	
	Charles Andureu	France	–	xxx										NM	

=== Qualifications ===
13 July
Qualifying 5.45 or 12 best to the Final

==== Group A ====
Rank	Name	Nationality	Result	Notes
1	Mateusz Didenkow	Poland	5.25	q
1	Jesper Fritz	Sweden	5.25	q
1	Wout van Wengerden	Netherlands	5.25	q
1	Steven Lewis	United Kingdom	5.25	q
5	Sergey Kucheryanu	Russia	5.25	q
6	Tobias Scherbarth	Germany	5.25	q
7	Renaud Lavillenie	France	5.25	q
8	Hendrik Gruber	Germany	5.15	
9	Paul Walker	United Kingdom	5.15	

==== Group B ====
Rank	Name	Nationality	Result	Notes
1	Denys Fedas	Ukraine	5.25	q
1	Pavel Prokopenko	Russia	5.25	q
3	Charles Andureu	France	5.25	q
4	Dmitriy Starodubtsev	Russia	5.25	q
4	Jere Bergius	Finland	5.25	q
6	Michel Frauen	Germany	4.95	
7	Luis Fernando Moro	Spain	4.95	
	Joe Ive	United Kingdom	NM	

== Participation ==
According to an unofficial count, 17 athletes from 10 countries participated in the event.

- Finland (1)
- France (2)
- Germany (3)
- Netherlands (1)
- Poland (1)
- Russia (3)
- Spain (1)
- Sweden (1)
- Ukraine (1)
- United Kingdom (3)
