= 2012 IAAF World Indoor Championships – Men's pole vault =

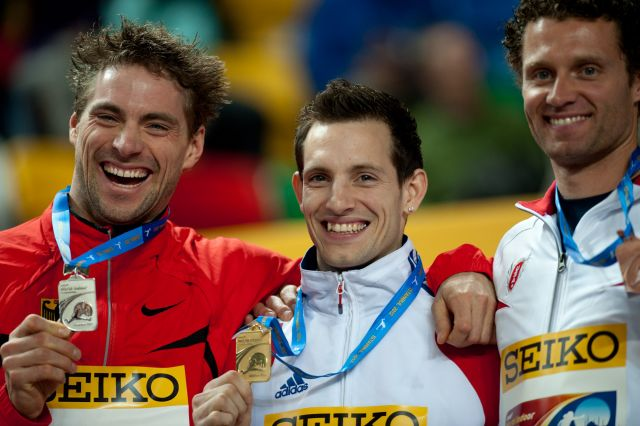
(from left) Björn Otto, Renaud Lavillenie and Brad Walker.

The men's pole vault at the 2012 IAAF World Indoor Championships took place on 10 March at the Ataköy Athletics Arena.

== Medalists ==
Gold	Silver	Bronze
Renaud Lavillenie; France	Björn Otto; Germany	Brad Walker; United States

== Records ==
Standing records prior to the 2012 IAAF World Indoor Championships
World record	Sergey Bubka (UKR)	6.15	Donetsk, Ukraine	21 February 1993
Championship record	Steven Hooker (AUS)	6.01	Doha, Qatar	13 March 2010
World Leading	Renaud Lavillenie (FRA)	5.93	Nevers, France	18 February 2012
African record	Okkert Brits (RSA)	5.90	Liévin, France	16 February 1997
African record	Okkert Brits (RSA)	5.90	Toronto, Canada	1 June 1997
Asian record	Igor Potapovich (KAZ)	5.92	Stockholm, Sweden	19 February 1998
European record	Sergey Bubka (UKR)	6.15	Donetsk, Ukraine	21 February 1993
North and Central American and Caribbean record	Jeff Hartwig (USA)	6.02	Sindelfingen, Germany	10 March 2002
Oceanian Record	Steven Hooker (AUS)	6.06	Boston, United States	7 February 2009
South American record	Fábio Gomes da Silva (BRA)	5.65	Linz, Austria	3 February 2011

== Qualification standards ==
Indoor
5.72

== Schedule ==
Date	Time	Round
March 10, 2012	17:00	Final

== Results ==
=== Final ===
10 athletes from 7 countries participated. The final started at 17:00 and ended at 18:58.

Rank	Athlete	Nationality	5.50	5.60	5.70	5.75	5.80	5.85	5.90	5.95	6.00	6.02	Result	Notes
1st place, gold medalist(s)	Renaud Lavillenie	France	-	xo	-	o	xo	o	xo	o	x-	xx	5.95	WL
2nd place, silver medalist(s)	Björn Otto	Germany	xo	-	o	-	xo	-	xxx				5.80	
3rd place, bronze medalist(s)	Brad Walker	United States	-	xo	-	x-	xo	-	xx-	-	x		5.80	
4	Malte Mohr	Germany	-	xxo	-	o	-	xxx					5.75	
5	Lázaro Borges	Cuba	o	o	xo	-	xxx						5.70	
5	Steven Lewis	Great Britain	o	-	xo	-	xxx						5.70	
7	Konstadinos Filippidis	Greece	o	xo	xo	-	xxx						5.70	
8	Romain Mesnil	France	o	-	xxx								5.50	
9	Dmitry Starodubtsev	Russia	xo	-	xxx								5.50	
	Scott Roth	United States	xxx										NM	
