= Jere Bergius =

Finnish pole vaulter

Jere Bergius (born 4 April 1987 in Vesilahti) is a retired Finnish pole vaulter. He competed in the pole vault event at the 2012 Summer Olympics.

== Competition record ==
| Year | Competition | Venue | Position | Notes |
Representing Finland
| 2007 | European U23 Championships | Debrecen, Hungary | 10th (q)^{†} | 5.25 m^{†} |
| 2009 | European U23 Championships | Kaunas, Lithuania | 16th (q) | 5.20 m |
| 2011 | European Indoor Championships | Paris, France | 13th (q) | 5.40 m |
| 2011 | World Championships | Daegu, South Korea | 24th (q) | 5.35 m |
| 2012 | European Championships | Helsinki, Finland | 18th (q) | 5.30 m |
| 2012 | Olympic Games | London, United Kingdom | – | NM |
| 2013 | World Championships | Moscow, Russia | 14th (q) | 5.40 m |

^{†}: No mark in the final.
