= Romain Mesnil =

French pole vaulter

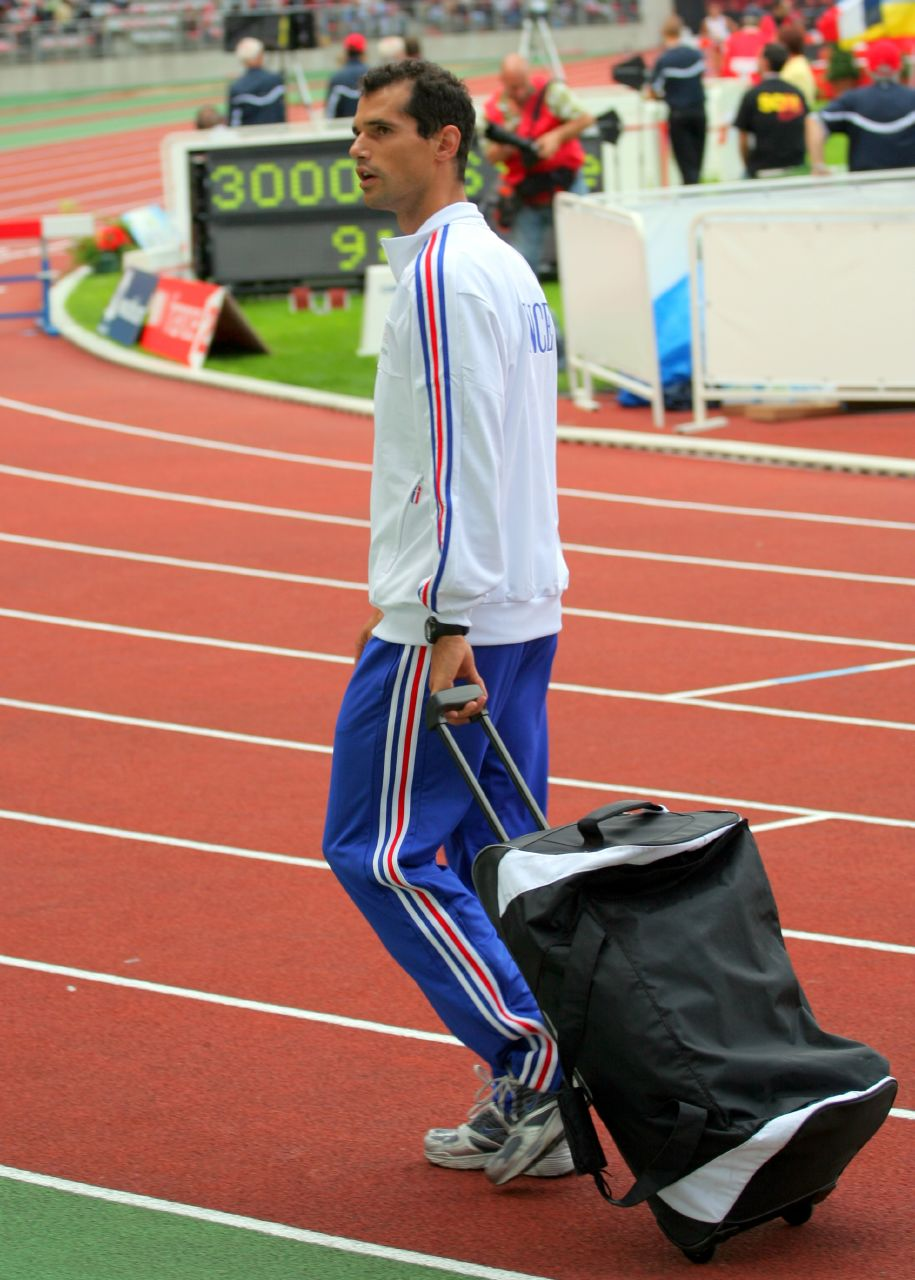

Personal information
- Born: 13 June 1977 (age 49)
- Height: 1.88 m (6 ft 2 in)
- Weight: 79 kg (174 lb)

Sport
- Country: France
- Sport: Athletics
- Event: Pole Vault

Achievements and titles
- Personal bests: Pole vault outdoor: 5.95 m (2003); Pole vault indoor: 5.86 m (2001)
Medal record
World Championships
| Silver medal – second place | 2007 Osaka | Pole vault |
| Silver medal – second place | 2009 Berlin | Pole vault |
World Indoor Championships
| Bronze medal – third place | 2001 Lisbon | Pole vault |
European Championships
| Silver medal – second place | 2006 Gothenburg | Pole vault |
Universiade
| Bronze medal – third place | 1999 Palma de Mallorca | Pole vault |
European Athletics U23 Championships
| Gold medal – first place | 1999 Gothenburg | Pole vault |
- Updated on 15 February 2015

Romain Mesnil (born 13 June 1977 in Le Plessis-Bouchard) is a retired, French pole vaulter. His personal outdoor best is 5.95 metres, achieved in August 2003 in Castres. His personal indoor best is 5.86 metres, set in March 2001 in Toulouse. His coach was Georges Martin.

== Biography ==
Mesnil won the 1999 European Athletics U23 Championships gold medal, 2 World Championship silvers, 1 World Indoor Championship bronze, 1 European Championship silver and 1 Universiade bronze. He won seven outdoor and three indoor French National Athletics Championships titles from 1998 to 2011.

In March 2009, Mesnil released a video of himself running naked through the streets of Paris as if to pole vault in Parisian tourist spots. The video, posted on YouTube, was an attempt to attract attention to his quest for a new sponsorship deal. His sponsorship contract with Nike had expired in 2008 and was not renewed.

Mesnil finished in 10th position (5.50m) in the pole vault final of the 2012 Summer Olympics in London, his fourth and final Olympic Games. He had previously taken part in the last three Olympics in Sydney, Athens and Beijing but had failed to qualify for the final each time.

Mesnil retired from pole vaulting in July 2013. His last competition - the Meeting Areva - was held on 6 July 2013 at the Stade de France in Paris.

== Results in international competitions ==
- Only the position and height in the final are indicated, unless otherwise stated. (q) means the athlete did not qualify for the final, with the overall position and height in the qualification round indicated.

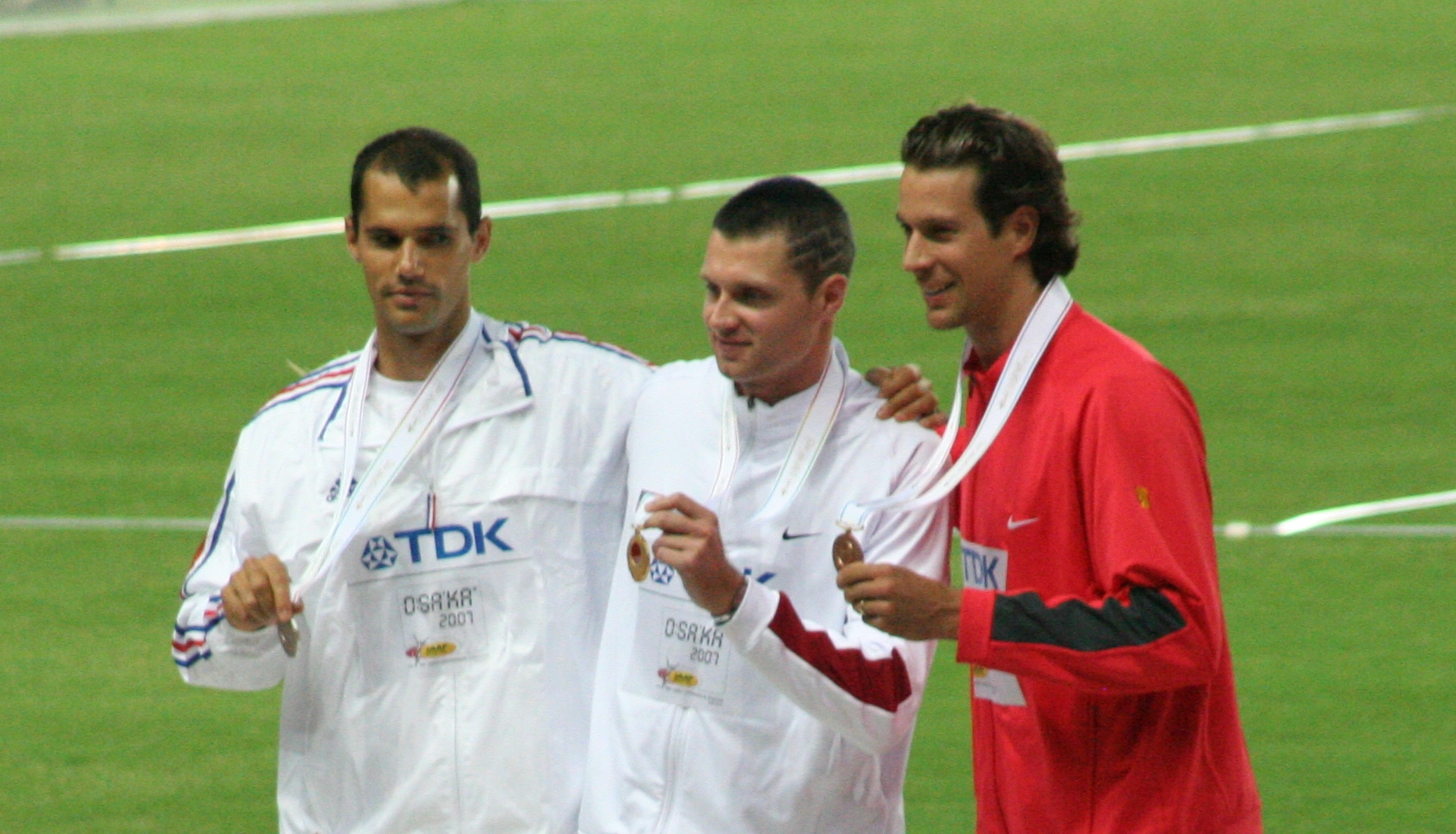
Romain Mesnil (on the left)

| Year | Competition | Venue | Position | Notes |
Representing France
| 1996 | World Junior Championships | Sydney, Australia | 13th (q) | 5.10 m |
| 1998 | European Indoor Championships | Valencia, Spain | 8th | 5.50 m |
| 1998 | European Championships | Budapest, Hungary | – (q) | NM |
| 1999 | World Indoor Championships | Maebashi, Japan | 6th | 5.70 m |
| 1999 | Universiade | Palma de Mallorca, Spain | 3rd | 5.55 m |
| 1999 | European U23 Championships | Gothenburg, Sweden | 1st | 5.93 m |
| 1999 | World Championships | Seville, Spain | 8th in qualification | 5.70 m in qualification |
| 2000 | Olympic Games | Sydney, Australia | 31st (q) | 5.40 m |
| 2001 | World Indoor Championships | Lisbon, Portugal | 3rd | 5.85 m |
| 2001 | World Championships | Edmonton, Canada | 5th | 5.85 m |
| 2002 | European Indoor Championships | Vienna, Austria | 10th (q) | 5.55 m |
| 2002 | European Championships | Munich, Germany | – (q) | NM |
| 2003 | World Indoor Championships | Birmingham, England | 7th | 5.60 m |
| 2003 | European Cup | Florence, Italy | 1st | 5.75 m |
| 2003 | World Championships | Paris, France | – (q) | NM |
| 2003 | World Athletics Final | Monte Carlo, Monaco | 7th | 5.45 m |
| 2004 | World Indoor Championships | Budapest, Hungary | 7th | 5.60 m |
| 2004 | European Cup | Bydgoszcz, Poland | 1st | 5.75 m |
| 2004 | Olympic Games | Athens, Greece | 18th (q) | 5.65 m |
| 2006 | World Indoor Championships | Moscow, Russia | – (q) | NM |
| 2006 | European Cup | Málaga, Spain | 1st | 5.70 m |
| 2006 | European Championships | Gothenburg, Sweden | 2nd | 5.65 m |
| 2007 | World Championships | Osaka, Japan | 2nd | 5.86 m |
| 2008 | Olympic Games | Beijing, China | 14th (q) | 5.55 m |
| 2009 | European Indoor Championships | Turin, Italy | 7th | 5.61 m |
| 2009 | World Championships | Berlin, Germany | 2nd | 5.85 m |
| 2010 | European Championships | Barcelona, Spain | 8th | 5.60 m |
| 2011 | World Championships | Daegu, South Korea | 1st in qualification | 5.65 m in qualification |
| 2012 | World Indoor Championships | Istanbul, Turkey | 8th | 5.50 m |
| 2012 | European Championships | Helsinki, Finland | – (q) | NM |
| 2012 | Olympic Games | London, United Kingdom | 10th | 5.50 m |

== See also ==
- French all-time top lists - Pole vault

Sporting positions
| Preceded by (Australia) Jeff Hartwig (Germany) Tim Lobinger | Men's Pole Vault Best Year Performance; 2003 | Succeeded by (United States) Timothy Mack |
