= Andrej Poljanec =

Slovenian pole vaulter (born 1984)

Andrej Poljanec (born 10 November 1984) is a Slovenian track & field athlete who specializes in the pole vault.

He was born in Ljubljana. He finished eleventh at the 2001 World Youth Championships. He also competed at the 2007 European Indoor Championships and the 2007 World Championships without reaching the final round.

Poljanec competed for the Northern Iowa Panthers track and field team in the NCAA. He later became a coach for the Wisconsin–Eau Claire Blugolds track and field team.

His personal best jump is 5.60 metres, achieved in June 2007 in Novo Mesto.

== Competition record ==
Year	Competition	Venue	Position	Notes
Representing Slovenia
2005	Mediterranean Games	Almería, Spain	5th	5.20 m
2005	European U23 Championships	Erfurt, Germany	11th	5.30 m
2007	European Indoor Championships	Birmingham, United Kingdom	18th (q)	5.20 m
2007	Universiade	Bangkok, Thailand	7th	5.25 m
2007	World Championships	Osaka, Japan	21st (q)	5.40 m
2009	Universiade	Belgrade, Serbia	5th	5.40 m
2011	Universiade	Shenzhen, China	9th	5.20 m
2013	European Indoor Championships	Gothenburg, Sweden	4th	5.20 m
