= Yevgeny Lukyanenko =

Russian pole vaulter (born 1985)

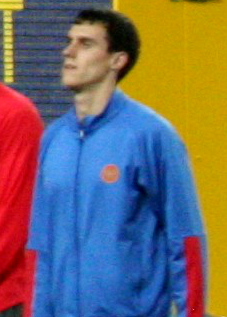
- Lukyanenko in 2007

Personal information
- Born: January 23, 1985 (age 41) Slavyansk-na-Kubani, Russian SFSR, Soviet Union
- Height: 1.89 m (6 ft 2 1/2 in)
- Weight: 78 kg (172 lb)

Sport
- Country: Russia
- Sport: Athletics
- Event: Pole vault
Medal record
Olympic Games
Silver medal – second place	2008 Beijing	Pole vault
World Indoor Championships
Gold medal – first place	2008 Valencia	Pole vault
- Updated on 11 August 2012

Yevgeny Yuryevich Lukyanenko (Russian: Евгений Юрьевич Лукьяненко, Evgenij Luk′ânenko; born 23 January 1985) is a Russian pole vaulter.

His personal best jump is 6.01 metres, achieved in July 2008 in Bydgoszcz.

== International competitions ==
Representing Russia
Year	Competition	Venue	Position	Notes
2007	World Championships	Osaka, Japan	6th	5.81 m
2008	World Indoor Championships	Valencia, Spain	1st	5.90 m
2008	Olympic Games	Beijing, China	2nd	5.85 m
2011	World Championships	Daegu, South Korea	18th (q)	5.50 m
2012	Olympic Games	London, United Kingdom	5th	5.75 m
