= Steven Lewis =

English pole vaulter

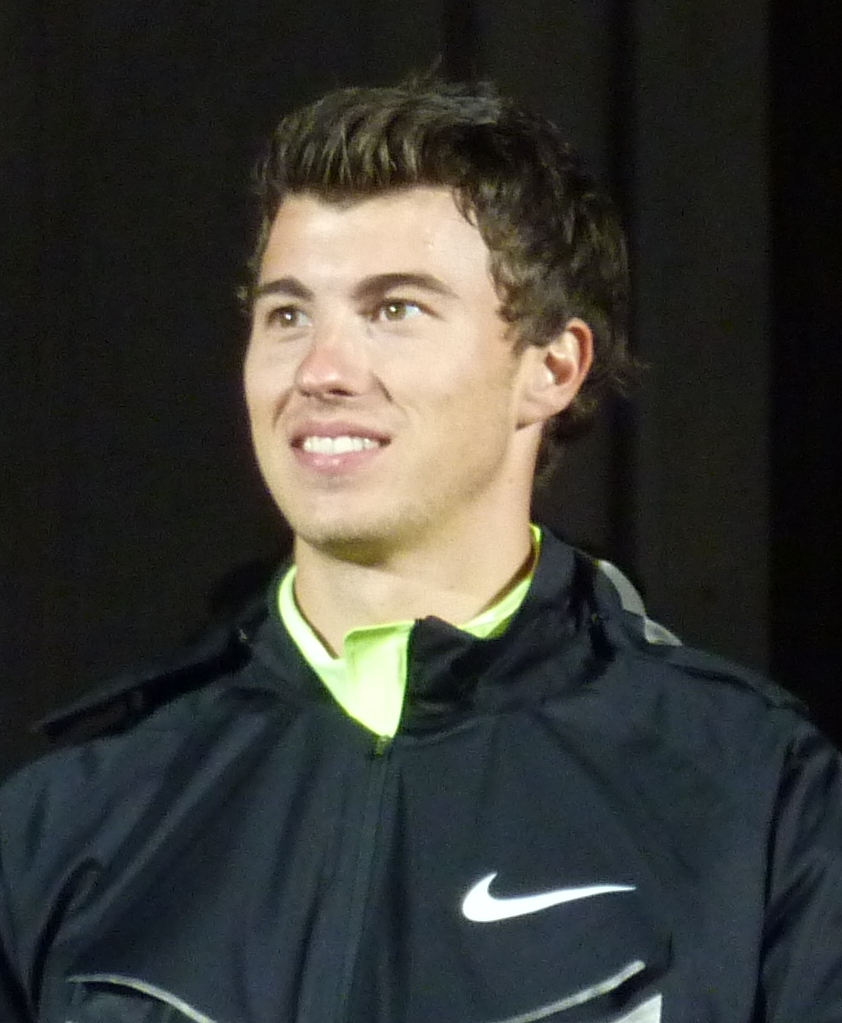
- Lewis in 2012

Personal information
- Full name: Steven James Lewis
- Born: 20 May 1986 (age 40) Stoke-on-Trent, England
- Height: 1.91 m (6 ft 3 in)
- Weight: 84 kg (185 lb)

Sport
- Sport: Athletics
- Event: Pole vault
- Club: Newham and Essex Beagles

Achievements and titles
- Highest world ranking: World Number 3
- Personal best: 5.82
Medal record
Men's athletics
Representing England
Commonwealth Games
Gold medal – first place	2014 Glasgow	Pole vault
Silver medal – second place	2010 Delhi	Pole vault
Bronze medal – third place	2006 Melbourne	Pole vault

Steven James Lewis (born 20 May 1986) is an English former pole vaulter. He won a gold medal at the Commonwealth Games and his personal best jump of 5.82 metres, set in July 2012, is the former British record for the event. Indoors his best is 5.77 m, achieved in Dessau on 2 March 2012.

== Biography ==
Lewis was born in Stoke-on-Trent, and he attended Holden Lane High School. Originally a hurdler, he switched to pole vaulting. Lewis finished in fourth place at the 2009 European Indoor Championships with jump of 5.71 m, which resulted in British head coach Charles van Commenee praising his development.

He represented Great Britain at the 2008 Summer Olympics and the 2012 Summer Olympics and is a three-time medalist for England at the Commonwealth Games. He has participated at the World Championships in Athletics on five occasions (2007, 2009, 2011, 2013 and 2015) and was a finalist on multiple occasions. He has been a finalist at the IAAF World Indoor Championships three times.

Lewis achieved a personal best and broke the British record of 5.80 m set by Nick Buckfield in 1998, with a vault of 5.82 m at the 2012 Janusz Kusociński Memorial in Szczecin, Poland. He competed in the 2012 Summer Olympics, finishing in fourth place with a vault of 5.75 m, becoming Britain's most successful men's pole vault Olympian.

In 2014, he won the Commonwealth title, completing a full set of Commonwealth medals. Injured in 2016 Lewis missed the Rio Olympic Qualification Standard and retired in early 2017 in Reno, Nevada. Lewis is considered the most successful British pole-vaulter of all time after representing Great Britain in major championship finals consistently over a 12-year period, winning 13 national titles, breaking junior and senior records, and winning international medals.

Lewis was seven-times British pole vault champion after winning the British AAA Championships title in 2006 and the British Athletics Championships in 2007, 2008, 2011, 2012, 2014 and 2015.

In January 2018 Lewis announced his retirement from athletics

== Competition record ==
Year	Competition	Venue	Position	Notes
Representing Great Britain and England
2003	World Youth Championships	Sherbrooke, Canada	3rd	5.05 m
2004	World Junior Championships	Grosseto, Italy	9th	5.00 m
2005	European Junior Championships	Kaunas, Lithuania	5th	5.10 m
2006	Commonwealth Games	Melbourne, Australia	3rd	5.50 m
2007	European Indoor Championships	Birmingham, United Kingdom	15th (q)	5.55 m
2007	European U23 Championships	Debrecen, Hungary	7th	5.55 m
2007	World Championships	Osaka, Japan	–	NM
2008	World Indoor Championships	Valencia, Spain	15th (q)	5.35 m
2008	Olympic Games	Beijing, China	–	NM
2009	European Indoor Championships	Turin, Italy	4th	5.71 m
2009	World Championships	Berlin, Germany	9th	5.65 m
2010	World Indoor Championships	Doha, Qatar	6th	5.45 m
2010	Commonwealth Games	Delhi, India	2nd	5.60 m
2011	World Championships	Daegu, South Korea	9th	5.65 m
2012	World Indoor Championships	Istanbul, Turkey	5th	5.70 m
2012	Olympic Games	London, United Kingdom	4th	5.75 m
2013	European Indoor Championships	Gothenburg, Sweden	6th	5.71 m
2013	World Championships	Moscow, Russia	–	NM
2014	Commonwealth Games	Glasgow, United Kingdom	1st	5.55 m
2014	European Championships	Zürich, Switzerland	11th	5.40 m
2015	World Championships	Beijing, China	29th (q)	5.40 m
