= Björn Otto =

German pole vaulter (born 1977)

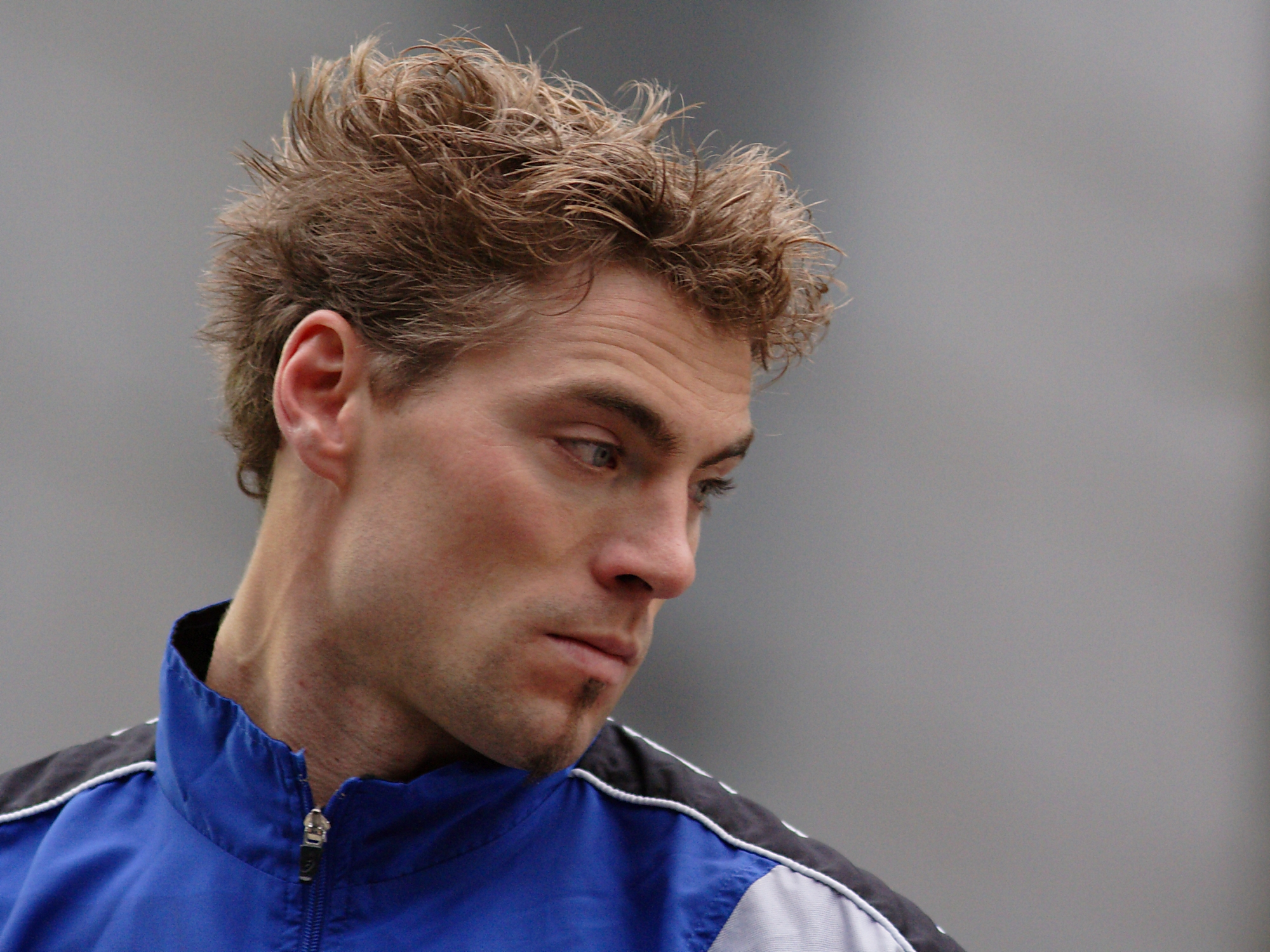
- Björn Otto in 2007

Personal information
- Born: 16 October 1977 (age 49) Frechen, West Germany
- Height: 1.91 m (6 ft 3 in)
- Weight: 90 kg (198 lb)

Sport
- Country: Germany
- Sport: Athletics
- Event: Pole Vault

Achievements and titles
- Personal bests: Pole vault outdoor: 6.01 (2012); Pole vault indoor: 5.92 (2012)
Medal record
Olympic Games
Silver medal – second place	2012 London	Pole vault
World Championships
Bronze medal – third place	2013 Moscow	Pole vault
World Indoor Championships
Silver medal – second place	2012 Istanbul	Pole vault
European Athletics Championships
Silver medal – second place	2012 Helsinki	Pole vault
European Indoor Championships
Silver medal – second place	2013 Gothenburg	Pole vault
Bronze medal – third place	2007 Birmingham	Pole vault
Universiade
Gold medal – first place	2005 İzmir	Pole vault
Bronze medal – third place	2003 Daegu	Pole vault

Björn Otto (born 16 October 1977) is a German retired pole vaulter.

On 30 January 2013 in Cottbus, Germany, with the mark of 5.90 m, he set the masters world record M35.

== Biography ==
His personal best is a jump of 6.01 metres, achieved on 5 September 2012 in Aachen. He cleared 5.92 metres indoors in February 2012 in Potsdam, and equaled it also at the German national indoor championships in Karlsruhe later that month. Arguably his biggest success was a second place at the 2012 Summer Olympics in London. In the same year, he also won a silver medal at the 2012 IAAF World Indoor Championships in Istanbul, Turkey, in March 2012 and a silver medal at the 2012 European Athletics Championships in Helsinki, Finland in July 2012.

== Achievements ==
Year	Competition	Venue	Position	Notes
1999	Universiade	Palma de Mallorca, Spain	8th	5.40 m
2000	European Indoor Championships	Ghent, Belgium	6th	5.50 m
2001	Universiade	Beijing, China	7th	5.35 m
2003	Universiade	Daegu, South Korea	3rd	5.50 m
2004	World Indoor Championships	Budapest, Hungary	11th (q)	5.65 m
2005	European Indoor Championships	Madrid, Spain	4th	5.70 m
2005	Universiade	İzmir, Turkey	1st	5.80 m
2007	European Indoor Championships	Birmingham, United Kingdom	3rd	5.71 m
2007	World Championships	Osaka, Japan	5th	5.81 m
2009	World Championships	Berlin, Germany	16th (q)	5.55 m
2012	World Indoor Championships	Istanbul, Turkey	2nd	5.80 m
2012	European Championships	Helsinki, Finland	2nd	5.92 m
2012	Olympic Games	London, United Kingdom	2nd	5.91 m
2013	European Indoor Championships	Gothenburg, Sweden	2nd	5.76 m
2013	World Championships	Moscow, Russia	3rd	5.82 m

== See also ==
- Six metres club
- German records in athletics
- Germany all-time top lists – Pole vault
- List of world records in masters athletics

Sporting positions
Preceded by (Poland) Paweł Wojciechowski	Men's Pole Vault Best Year Performance; 2012	Succeeded by
