= Tobias Scherbarth =

German pole vaulter

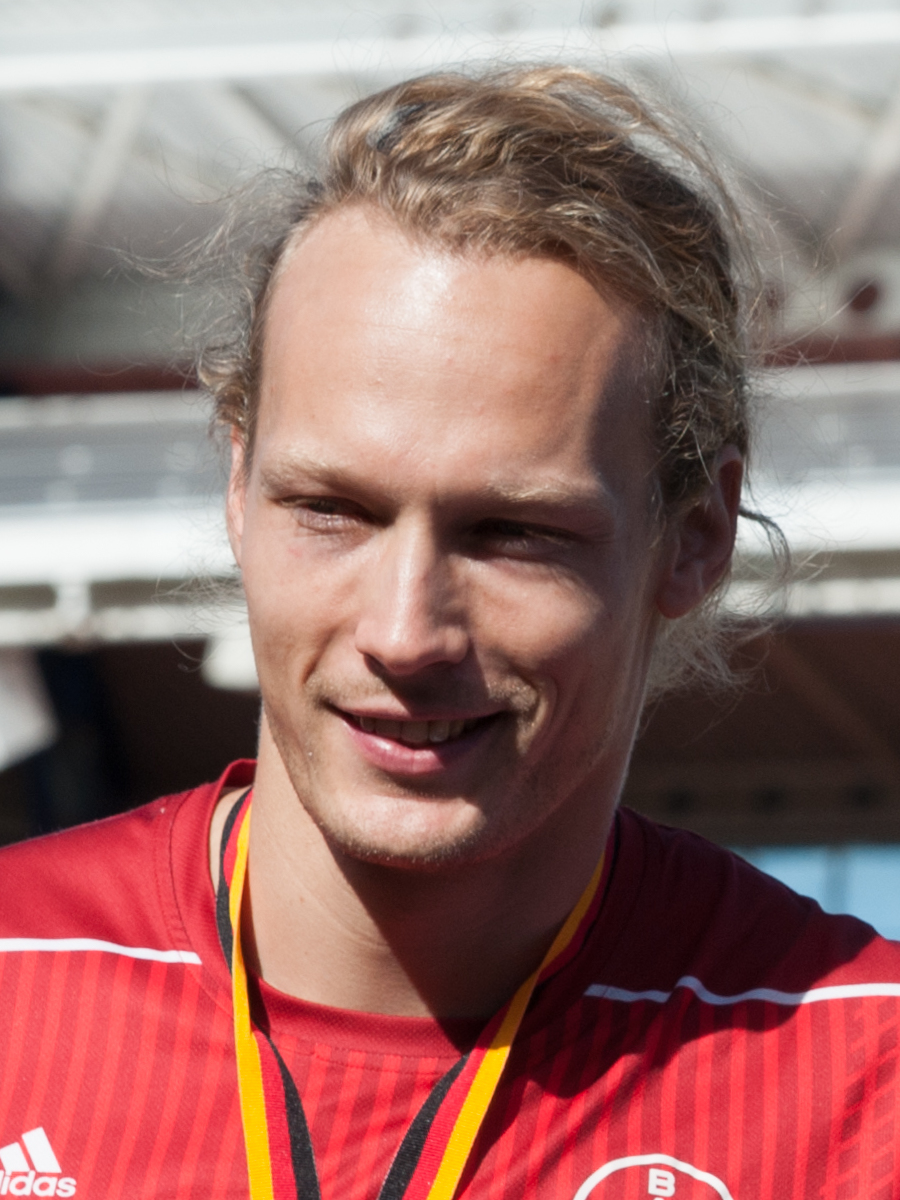
- Scherbarth at the 2015 German Championships

Personal information
- Born: 17 August 1985 (age 40) Leipzig, East Germany
- Education: German Sport University Cologne
- Height: 1.95 m (6 ft 5 in)
- Weight: 81 kg (179 lb)

Sport
- Sport: Track and field
- Event: Pole vault
- Club: TSV Bayer 04 Leverkusen
- Coached by: Leszek Klima

Tobias Scherbarth (born 17 August 1985) is a German athlete specialising in the pole vault.

His personal bests in the event are 5.73 metres outdoors (Phoenix 2014) and 5.7662 metres indoors (Stuttgart 2009).

== Competition record ==
Year	Competition	Venue	Position	Notes
Representing Germany
2005	European U23 Championships	Erfurt, Germany	14th (q)	5.10 m
2007	European U23 Championships	Debrecen, Hungary	5th	5.60 m
2007	Universiade	Bangkok, Thailand	4th	5.50 m
2009	Universiade	Belgrade, Serbia	1st (q)	5.20 m
2014	European Championships	Zürich, Switzerland	–	NM
2015	European Indoor Championships	Prague, Czech Republic	9th	5.45 m
2015	World Championships	Beijing, China	7th	5.65 m
2014	European Championships	Zürich, Switzerland	–	NM
2016	European Championships	Amsterdam, Netherlands	19th (q)	5.35 m
2016	Olympic Games	Rio de Janeiro, Brazil	25th (q)	5.45 m
