= Jérôme Clavier =

French pole vaulter (born 1983)

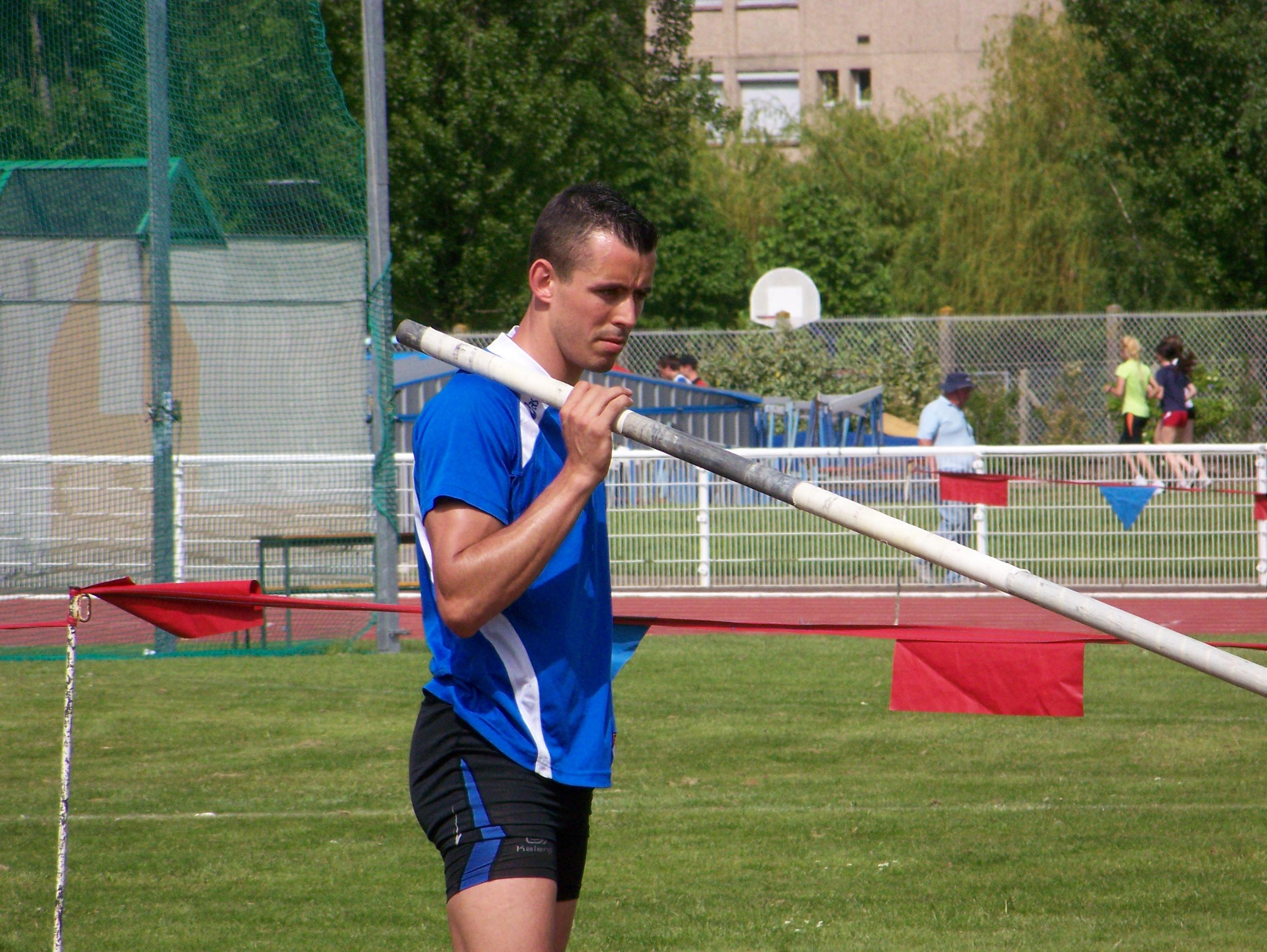
Medal record
Men's athletics
Representing France
European Indoor Championships
Silver medal – second place	2011 Paris	Pole vault

Jérôme Clavier (born 3 May 1983 in Chambray-lès-Tours) is a French pole vaulter.

== Biography ==
He finished sixth at the 2002 World Junior Championships, seventh at the 2003 Summer Universiade and sixth at the 2007 European Indoor Championships. He competed at the World Indoor Championships in 2004 and 2006 without reaching the finals.

His personal best is 5.75 metres, achieved on 9 July 2008 in Karlsruhe. He has a better indoor result with 5.85 m,21 January 2011 Villeurbanne.

== Competition record ==
Year	Competition	Venue	Position	Notes
Representing France
2002	World Junior Championships	Kingston, Jamaica	6th	5.40 m
2003	European U23 Championships	Bydgoszcz, Poland	15th (q)	5.20 m
2003	Universiade	Daegu, South Korea	7th	5.40 m
2004	World Indoor Championships	Budapest, Hungary	18th (q)	5.45 m
2005	Mediterranean Games	Almería, Spain	3rd	5.55 m
2005	European U23 Championships	Erfurt, Germany	3rd	5.60 m
2006	World Indoor Championships	Moscow, Russia	14th (q)	5.45 m
2007	European Indoor Championships	Birmingham, United Kingdom	6th	5.41 m
2007	World Championships	Osaka, Japan	20th (q)	5.55 m
2008	World Indoor Championships	Valencia, Spain	4th	5.75 m
2008	Olympic Games	Beijing, China	7th	5.60 m
2011	European Indoor Championships	Paris, France	2nd	5.76 m
2011	World Championships	Daegu, South Korea	18th (q)	5.50 m
2012	European Championships	Helsinki, Finland	10th	5.40 m
2014	World Indoor Championships	Sopot, Poland	10th	5.55 m
2016	World Indoor Championships	Portland, United States	12th	5.55 m

== See also ==
- French all-time top lists - Pole vault
