= Athletics at the 2007 Summer Universiade – Men's pole vault =

The men's pole vault event at the 2007 Summer Universiade was held on 12 August.

== Results ==
Rank	Athlete	Nationality	4.70	4.90	5.10	5.25	5.40	5.50	5.60	5.65	5.70	5.65	5.60	5.55	Result	Notes
1st place, gold medalist(s)	Alexander Straub	Germany	–	–	–	o	o	xxo	xo	xxx		x	x	o	5.60	
2nd place, silver medalist(s)	Leonid Kivalov	Russia	–	–	–	o	xo	xo	xo	–	xxx	x	x	x	5.60	
3rd place, bronze medalist(s)	Dmitry Starodubtsev	Russia	–	–	–	o	xo	o	xx–	x					5.50	
4	Tobias Scherbarth	Germany	–	–	–	o	o	xo	xx–	x					5.50	
5	Jason Wurster	Canada	–	–	o	xo	xo	xxx							5.40	SB
6	Patrick Schütz	Switzerland	–	xxo	–	o	xxx								5.25	
7	Andrej Poljanec	Slovenia	–	–	xo	xo	xxx								5.25	
8	Mohsen Rabbani	Iran	–	o	xo	xxo	xxx								5.25	
9	Jarno Kivioja	Finland	–	–	xo	xxx									5.10	
9	Nikolaos Syntichakis	Greece	–	–	xo	xxx									5.10	
11	Eigo Siimu	Estonia	–	xo	xo	xxx									5.10	
12	Vladyslav Revenko	Ukraine	–	–	xxo	xx–	x								5.10	
13	Yavgeniy Olhovsky	Israel	–	xo	xxx										4.90	
14	Sompong Saombankuay	Thailand	xo	–	xxx										4.70	
	Olivier Frey	Switzerland	–	–	xxx										NM	
	Pichitpol Singthonghom	Thailand	xxx												NM	
