= Igor Pavlov (athlete) =

Russian pole vaulter (born 1979)

Igor Vladimirovich Pavlov (Russian: Игорь Владимирович Павлов, born 18 July 1979 in Moscow) is a Russian pole vaulter.

He won the silver medal at the 2003 Summer Universiade, and in the following years he became indoor champion on national, European and World level. He finished fourth both at the 2004 Summer Olympics and the 2005 World Championships, the former in a personal best jump of 5.80 metres (19 ft 0 in).

He won the gold medal in the pole vault at the 2009 Maccabiah Games.

== International competitions ==
Representing Russia
Year	Competition	Venue	Position	Notes
2003	Universiade	Daegu, South Korea	2nd	5.65 m
2004	World Indoor Championships	Budapest, Hungary	1st	5.80 m
2004	Olympic Games	Athens, Greece	4th	5.80 m
2004	World Athletics Final	Monte Carlo, Monaco	8th	5.45 m
2005	European Indoor Championships	Madrid, Spain	1st	5.90 m
2005	World Championships	Helsinki, Finland	4th	5.65 m
2005	World Athletics Final	Monte Carlo, Monaco	3rd	5.60 m
2006	World Indoor Championships	Moscow, Russia	12th (q)	5.55 m
2007	European Indoor Championships	Birmingham, United Kingdom	9th (q)	5.55 m
2007	World Championships	Osaka, Japan	4th	5.81 m
2008	Olympic Games	Beijing, China	9th	5.60 m
2009	World Championships	Berlin, Germany	16th (q)	5.55 m
2011	European Indoor Championships	Paris, France	7th	5.51 m

== See also ==
- List of European Athletics Indoor Championships medalists (men)
- List of Maccabiah medalists in athletics (men)
- List of IAAF World Indoor Championships medalists (men)
