= Stanislau Tsivonchyk =

Belarusian pole vaulter

Stanislau Uladzimiravich Tsivonchyk (Belarusian: Станіслаў Уладзіміравіч Цівончык; born 5 March 1985 in Tiraspol, Moldavian SSR) is a Belarusian pole vaulter. He competed in the pole vault event at the 2012 Summer Olympics.
