= Sergey Kucheryanu =

Russian pole vaulter

Personal information
- Born: June 30, 1985 (age 40)
- Height: 1.84 m (6 ft 1/2 in)
- Weight: 71 kg (157 lb)

Sport
- Country: Russia
- Sport: Athletics
- Event: Pole Vault
- Updated on 11 August 2012

Sergey Mikhailovich Kucheryanu (Russian: Сергей Михайлович Кучеряну; born in 1985) is a Russian pole vaulter.

His best performance is 5.81 m (Dessau, 2008) and he also reached 5.72 m twice in 2012 (1st at National Championships in Cheboksary), when he qualified for the London 2012 Olympics.

Between December 2010 and June 2011, Kucheryanu trained in Australia with the financial support of the Australian Institute of Sport. It was expected that he would receive Australian citizenship and represent his new country at the 2012 Olympics. Administrative delays and tougher rules for athletes changing citizenship countered those plans and Kucheryanu eventually returned to Russia, and competed for them at the 2012 Summer Olympics.
