= Oleksandr Korchmid =

Ukrainian pole vaulter (born 1982)

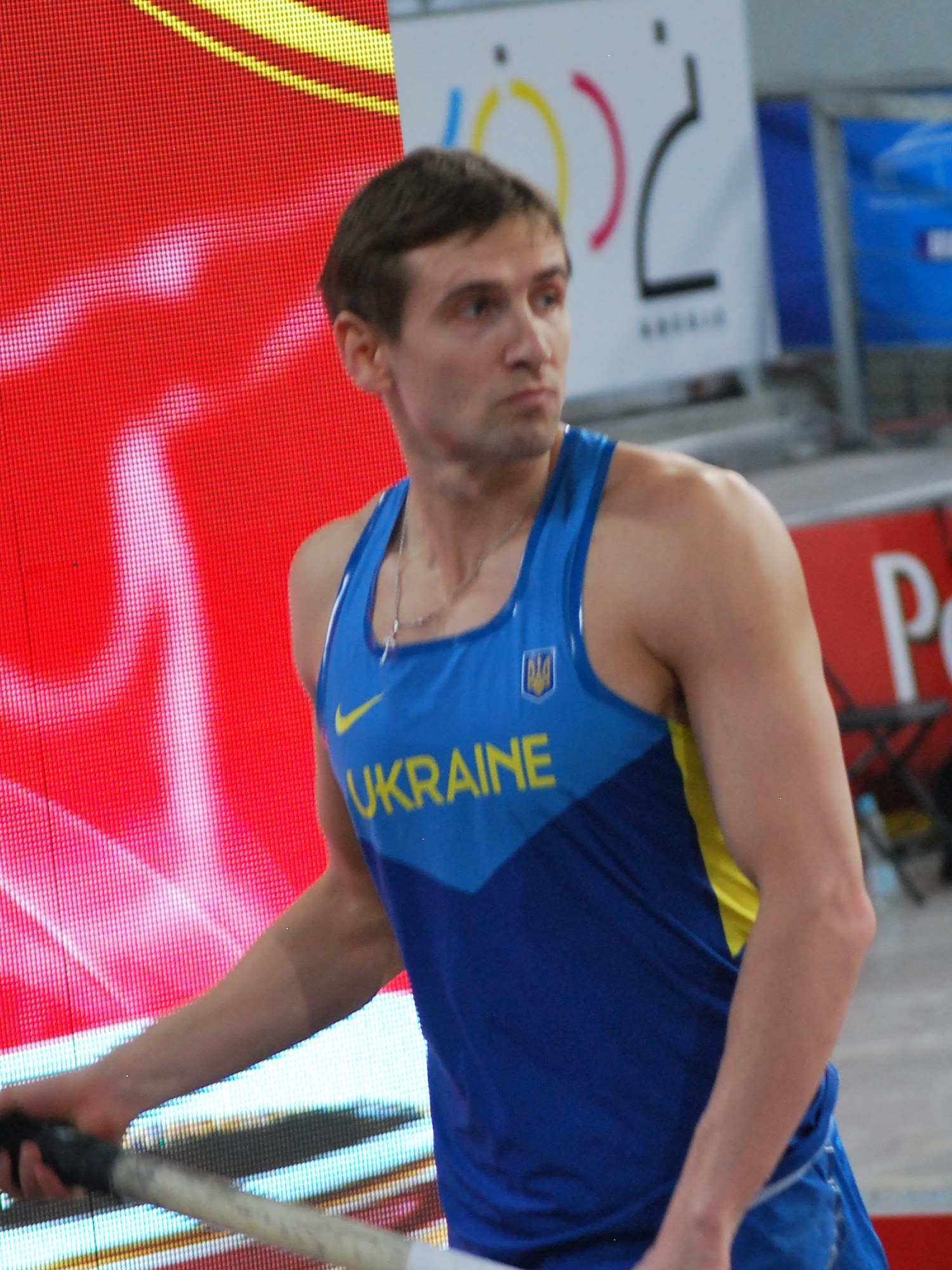
- Oleksandr Korchmid in 2015

Medal record

Men's athletics

Representing Ukraine

Summer Universiade
| Gold medal – first place | 2003 Daegu | Pole vault |
| Bronze medal – third place | 2005 Izmir | Pole vault |

European U23 Championships
| Gold medal – first place | 2003 Bydgoszcz | Pole vault |

World Youth Championships
| Silver medal – second place | 1999 Bydgoszcz | Pole vault |

World Junior Championships
| Silver medal – second place | 2000 Santiago | Pole vault |

World Youth Games
| Silver medal – second place | 1998 Moscow | Pole vault |

Oleksandr Korchmid (Ukrainian: Олександр Корчмід; born 22 January 1982) is a Ukrainian pole vaulter.

As a junior, he won silver medals at the 1999 World Youth Championships and the 2000 World Junior Championships. He was also a gold medalist at the 2003 Summer Universiade and a bronze medalist at the 2005 Summer Universiade. He also competed in the 2004 Olympic Games, but came last in the pole vault final. He finished sixth in the pole vault final at the 2006 European Athletics Championships and fourth at the 2007 European Athletics Indoor Championships. He then competed at the 2007 World Championships and the 2008 Olympic Games without reaching the final.

His personal best jump is 5.81 metres, achieved in August 2005 in Rovereto.

In 2009 he was found guilty of ephedrine doping. The sample was delivered on 15 February 2009 in an in-competition test in Donetsk. He did not receive a suspension, rather a public warning.
