= Brad Walker (pole vaulter) =

American pole vaulter (born 1981)

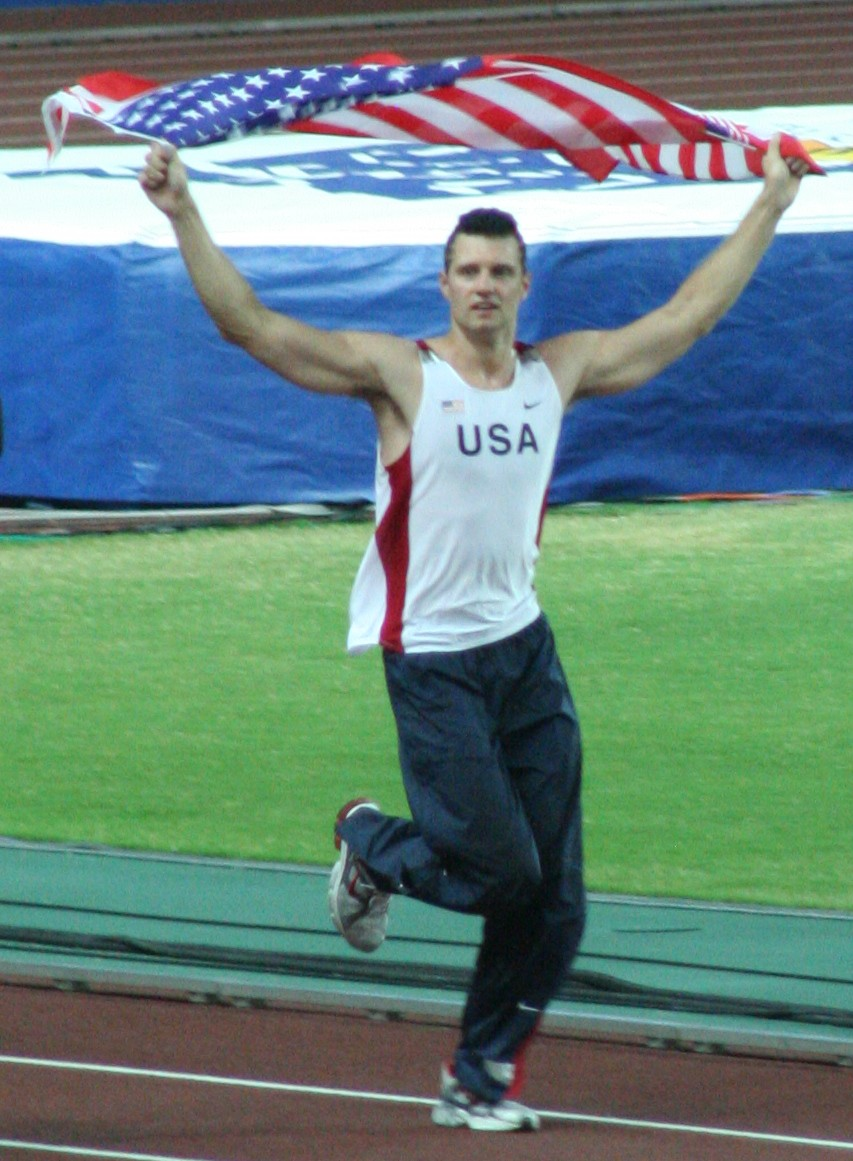
- Walker at the 2007 World Championships in Athletics

Personal information
- Born: June 21, 1981 (age 45) Aberdeen, South Dakota, U.S.
- Height: 6 ft 2 in (1.88 m)
- Weight: 190 lb (86 kg)
- Spouse: Sage Walker

Sport
- Country: United States
- Sport: Athletics
- Event: Pole Vault
Medal record
World Championships
Gold medal – first place	2007 Osaka	Pole vault
Silver medal – second place	2005 Helsinki	Pole vault
World Indoor Championships
Gold medal – first place	2006 Moscow	Pole vault
Silver medal – second place	2008 Valencia	Pole vault
Bronze medal – third place	2012 Istanbul	Pole vault
- Updated on August 11, 2012

Brad Walker (born June 21, 1981, in Aberdeen, South Dakota) is an American pole vaulter. He was the American recordholder and was the 2007 World Champion in the event.

== Collegiate and professional career ==
Walker attended the University of Washington, where he was a member of Phi Gamma Delta fraternity. While there, he became NCAA indoor pole vault champion twice and four-time NCAA All-American under Coach Pat Licari. In 2005 he became both indoor and outdoor National Champion.

Perhaps not among the favorites in the 2005 World Championships, Walker nonetheless won the silver medal with 5.75. Two weeks later in Rieti he set a new personal best of 5.96. In 2006 he won the World Indoor Championships in Moscow with a jump of 5.80meters. In July 2006, at Jockgrim, Germany, Brad Walker, cleared 6 meters, the best performance of the year, in a pole vault competition. He won the gold in the world championships on September 1, 2007. On June 8, 2008, Walker jumped in Eugene to a new personal and American record with 6.04. Walker qualified for the 2008 Olympics, but failed to clear a height in the preliminary rounds.

Walker retained his US championship title in 2009, even though his status as reigning World Champion gave him a bye into the 2009 World Championships in Athletics.

At the 2012 Summer Olympics, Walker reached the final but finished 12th with a 5.50m vault.

== See also ==
- 6 metres club

Sporting positions
Preceded by (Australia) Paul Burgess	Men's Pole Vault Best Year Performance; 2006 – 2008	Succeeded by (France) Renaud Lavillenie
