= Steve Hooker =

Australian pole vaulter (born 1982)

Steve Hooker OAM
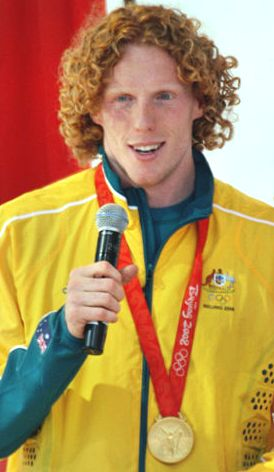
- Steve Hooker in 2008

Personal information
- Full name: Steven Leslie Hooker
- Nickname: Hooksy
- Nationality: Australian
- Born: 16 July 1982 (age 44) Melbourne, Australia
- Height: 187 cm (6 ft 1 1/2 in)
- Weight: 75 kg (165 lb)

Sport
- Sport: Athletics
- Event: Pole vault

Achievements and titles
- Olympic finals: 2004 Athens Olympics, 2008 Beijing Olympics and 2012 London Olympics
Medal record
Representing Australia
Olympic Games
Gold medal – first place	2008 Beijing	Pole vault
World Championships
Gold medal – first place	2009 Berlin	Pole vault
World Indoor Championships
Gold medal – first place	2010 Doha	Pole vault
Bronze medal – third place	2008 Valencia	Pole vault
Commonwealth Games
Gold medal – first place	2006 Melbourne	Pole vault
Gold medal – first place	2010 Delhi	Pole vault
World Cup
Gold medal – first place	2006 Athens	Pole vault
Continental Cup
Gold medal – first place	2010 Split	Pole vault
World Athletics Final
Bronze medal – third place	2007 Stuttgart	Pole vault

Steven Leslie Hooker OAM (born 16 July 1982) is an Australian former pole vaulter and Olympic gold medalist. His personal best, achieved in 2008, is 6.06 m (19 ft 10 1/2 in) making him the sixth-highest pole vaulter in history.

Hooker was born in Melbourne, Victoria, and has a personal best of 10.79 s in 100 m as an amateur sprinter. He ran in the 2010 Stawell Gift.

== Career ==
Hooker won gold at the 2008 Beijing Olympics with a vault of 5.96 metres, setting a new Olympic record, and making him the first Australian male track and field gold medallist in 40 years since Ralph Doubell won the 800 metres in Mexico City in 1968.

At the 2009 World Athletics Championships, in Berlin, Hooker won the gold medal despite a hamstring injury. On only his second jump, Hooker cleared 5.90 metres, after missing 5.85 metres on his first attempt.

At the 2010 IAAF World Indoor Championships, Hooker won the gold medal in the pole vault with a vault of 6.01 metres, a championship record.

At the 2010 Commonwealth Games, Hooker won the gold medal in the pole vault.

Hooker competed at the 2012 London Olympics and finished 14th after failing to vault a height in the final.

Hooker joined six-metre club for the first time on 27 January 2008 at an outdoor competition in Perth, Western Australia with a vault of 6.0m. On 7 February 2009, at the Boston Indoor Games he set an Australian indoor record with a vault of 6.06m. Both heights were the Australian record at the time of his retirement.

During his career he was coached by Mark Stewart and Alex Parnov.

He retired from athletics in April 2014, choosing to focus on his family. His wife Yekaterina Kostetskaya gave birth to their first son, Maxim, in 2013, and the couple have since had two more sons.

== Honours ==
In the 2009 Australia Day Honours, Steve Hooker was awarded the Medal of the Order of Australia (OAM) "For service to sport as a Gold Medallist at the Beijing 2008 Olympic Games". In October 2017, Hooker was inducted into the Sport Australia Hall of Fame as an athlete member.

== Personal life ==
Hooker attended Greythorn Primary School and Balwyn High School in Balwyn North, Victoria.

His mother Erica Hooker was a 1972 Olympian and a 1978 Commonwealth Games long jump silver medalist. She also won nine national titles. His father Bill represented Australia in the 800 m and 4 x 400 m at the 1974 Commonwealth Games and won four national crowns.

He began his career with the Box Hill Athletic Club. His career started slowly, and he only went professional in 2006. He relocated to Perth, living on a very modest Australian Sports Commission allowance.

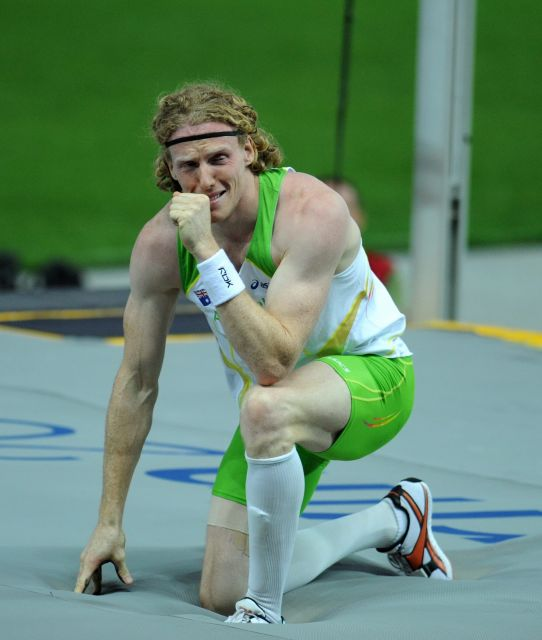
Hooker was emotional after victory at the 2009 World Championships

== Summary of athletic achievements ==
Year	Competition	Venue	Position	Notes
Representing Australia
2000	World Junior Championships	Santiago, Chile	4th	5.20 m
2006	Commonwealth Games	Melbourne, Australia	1st	5.80 m
2006	World Athletics Final	Stuttgart, Germany	5th	5.75 m
2006	World Cup	Athens, Greece	1st	5.80 m
2007	World Athletics Final	Stuttgart, Germany	3rd	5.81 m
2008	World Indoor Championships	Valencia, Spain	3rd	5.80 m
2008	Olympic Games	Beijing, China	1st	5.96 m OR
2009	World Championships	Berlin, Germany	1st	5.90 m
2010	World Indoor Championships	Doha, Qatar	1st	6.01 m CR
2010	Continental Cup	Split, Croatia	1st	5.95 m CR
2010	Commonwealth Games	New Delhi, India	1st	5.60 m

== See also ==
- 6 metres club
