= Liu Feiliang =

Chinese pole vaulter (born 1985)

Liu Feiliang (simplified Chinese: 刘飞亮; traditional Chinese: 劉飛亮; pinyin: Liú Fēiliàng, born 27 March 1985) is a pole vaulter from Qingdao, China.

He won the bronze medal at the 2004 World Junior Championships. He also competed at the 2004 Olympic Games, the 2007 World Championships and the 2008 World Indoor Championships without reaching the final round.

His personal best jump is 5.71 metres, achieved in July 2007 in Guangzhou.
