= Giovanni Lanaro =

Mexican-American pole vaulter

Personal information
- Born: 27 September 1981 (age 44) Los Angeles, United States

Sport
- Sport: Track and field
Medal record
Representing Mexico
Pan American Games
Silver medal – second place	2007 Rio de Janeiro	Pole vault
Bronze medal – third place	2011 Guadalajara	Pole vault
Central American and Caribbean Games
Gold medal – first place	2010 Mayaguez	Pole vault

Giovanni Alessandro Lanaro Mercado (born 27 September 1981) is a Mexican-American former pole vaulter who is currently the Women's Head Coach at his alma mater, Mt. San Antonio College (Mt. SAC).

== Youth and college ==
Giovanni Lanaro attended West Covina High School in California; Lanaro pole vaulted as a freshman in high school (3.51m) but suffered a back injury as well as a fractured ankle skateboarding that prevented him from vaulting the next three years. He focused on swimming and made the CIF Southern Section Finals, before deciding to give the vault one more try at Mt. San Antonio College (Mt. SAC) in Walnut, CA.

In two years at Mt. SAC, Lanaro raised his personal best from 3.51m to 5.30m breaking the college record of 5.21 meters held by Olympic Gold/Silver Medalist, Bob Seagren and Bob Halverson. During his freshman season, he improved his personal best to 5.05m (a 5'00" (1.49m) improvement) taking the California Community College Championship and placing 4th at the 2000 USA Track and Field (USATF) Junior Nationals. In his sophomore season, he surpassed the former record 8-times and capped it off with the 2001 National Community College Title.

At Mt. SAC, Lanaro was fortunate to train alongside many top pole vaulters including Olympic Gold Medalist Tim Mack, Canadian Record Holder Rob Pike, Japanese Champions Manabu Yokoyama and Fumiaki Kobayashi. After redshirting after his sophomore season to recover from ankle surgery, Lanaro shunned full-ride scholarship offers from USC, South Carolina, Michigan State and Fresno State to attend little known, but local, Cal State Fullerton. At Cal State Fullerton, under current Mt. SAC Head Men's Coach Ron Kamaka, he earned three NCAA All-American honors and raised his career best to 5.60m.

== Professional career ==
Lanaro finished in joint fourth place at the 2006 IAAF World Indoor Championships in Moscow, and won the silver medal at the 2007 Pan American Games. He also competed in the 2004 Summer Olympics, 2008 Summer Olympics, 2005 World Championships and 2007 World Championships.

he failed to qualify for the final of the 2007 World Championships in Athletics. He jumped 5.70 meters or higher nine times, including three competitions of over 5.80 meters. Along the way he captured a host of competitions titles including the Mt. SAC Relays, Road to Eugene, Reebok Grand Prix, Nike Prefontaine Classic and Padua International Athletics Meet. At the Nike Prefontaine Classic, he jumped 5.80 meters in the rain and into a headwind, defeating the stellar field, which included all three 2004 Olympic Medalists, the U.S. record holder, the Japanese record holder and the U.S. Champion, by 20 centimeters.

His personal best jump of 5.82 metres was achieved in April 2007, at the Mt. SAC Relays, in Walnut. During his professional career he was coached by his Mt. SAC Coach/USA Track and Field Women's Pole Vault Development/High Performance Chairperson, Brian Yokoyama and was represented by super agent, Karen Locke. Lanaro trained mostly by himself without a jumping partner however, throughout the years, he often trained with his close friend, Japanese Olympian and Record Holder Daichi Sawano, during his frequent training trips to California.

== Records Held ==
- Mt. San Antonio College Record (5.40M), Mt. SAC Relays Record (5.82m)
- California State University at Fullerton Record (5.60M)
- Nishida Cup Record (Indoor 5.65M)
- Hilmer Lodge Stadium, Walnut, CA (5.82M)
- Mexican National Record (5.82M)
- Central American Record (5.82M)
- Feb. 16, 2009 equal Area Indoor Record, Stockholm, Sweden (5.71M)
