= Alhaji Jeng =

Swedish pole vaulter

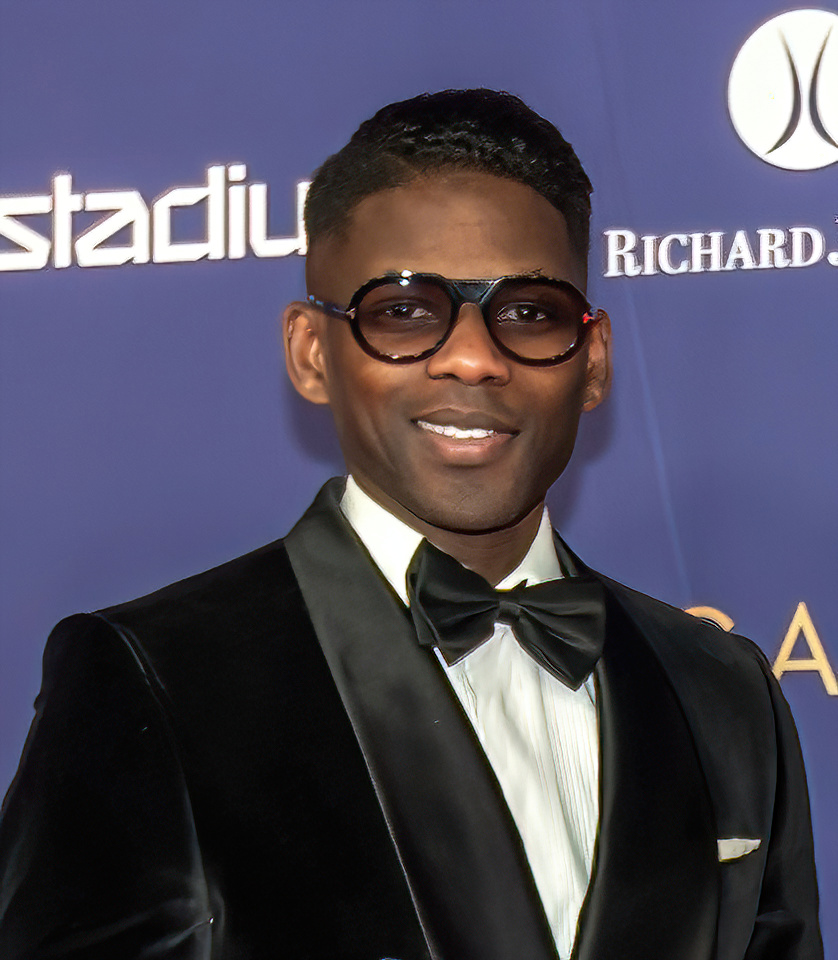

Personal information
- Born: 13 December 1981 (age 44) Banjul, The Gambia
- Height: 1.85 m (6 ft 1 in)
- Weight: 80 kg (176 lb)

Sport
- Country: Sweden
- Sport: Athletics
- Event: Pole Vault
- Club: Örgryte IS
- Coached by: Yannick Tregaro

Achievements and titles
- Personal best: 5.81(Indoor)
Medal record
Silver medal – second place	2006 Moscow	Pole vault
Gold medal – first place	2005 Helsingborg	Pole vault
Gold medal – first place	2006 Sollentuna	Pole vault
Silver medal – second place	2008 Västerås	Pole vault
Gold medal – first place	2011 Gävle	Pole vault
Gold medal – first place	2012 Stockholm	Pole vault
Gold medal – first place	2014 Umeå	Pole vault
- Updated on 8 February 2015

Alhaji Jeng (born 13 December 1981) is a Swedish pole vaulter.

Jeng came to Sweden when he was just 3 months old, but retained his Gambian citizenship until he was 18 years old, when he applied for and was granted Swedish citizenship. He currently has the Gambian national record at 5.30 metres, set before his Swedish citizenship.

For Sweden he won the silver medal at the 2006 IAAF World Indoor Championships he has also won 5 Swedish championships in athletics. He previously held the Swedish national indoor record at 5.81 metres. His outdoor personal best is 5.80 metres, achieved in June 2006 in Zhukovskiy. This places him fourth on the Swedish all-time list, behind Armand Duplantis and Oscar Janson and Patrik Kristiansson and equal to Martin Eriksson.

At the 2008 Summer Olympics, he missed out on qualification for the pole vault final by one place, since then he's participated in the 2008 IAAF World Indoor Championships, the 2009 IAAF World Championships, the 2011 IAAF World Championships, the 2012 Olympic games and the 2013 IAAF World Championships.

== Personal life ==
Jeng is a practicing Muslim, according to him Islam is very important in his life. He currently lives in Gothenburg.
