= 2023 World Athletics Championships – Men's pole vault =

Men's pole vault at the 2023 World Championships
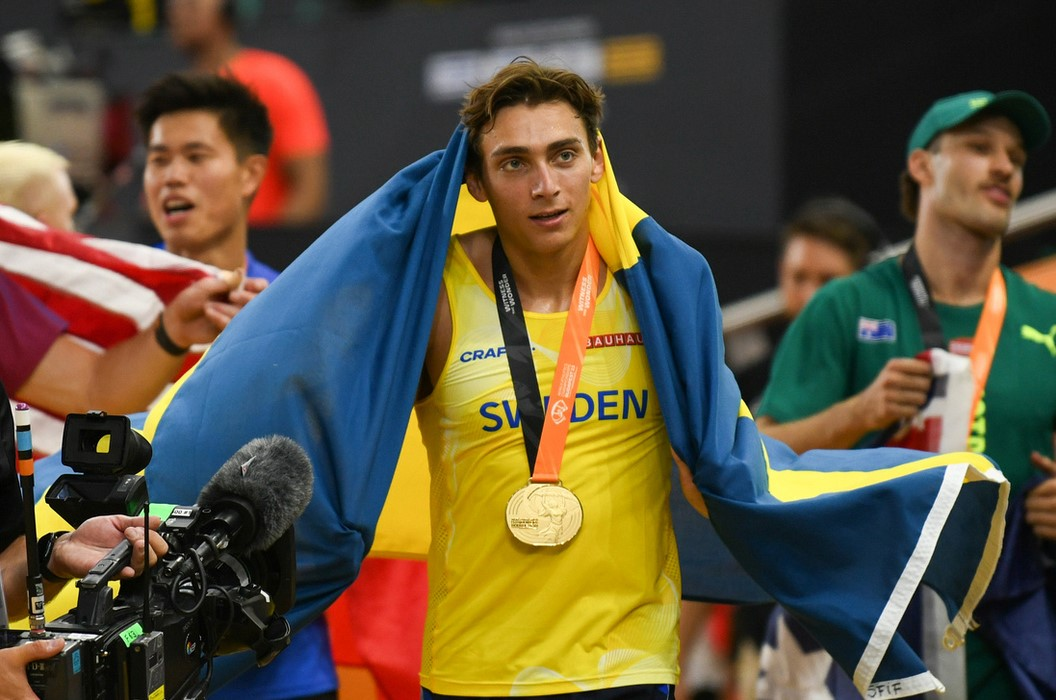
- Armand Duplantis shortly after the final.
- Venue: National Athletics Centre
- Dates: 23 August (qualification); 26 August (final)
- Competitors: 34 from 23 nations
- Winning height: 6.10

Medalists
gold medal	Armand Duplantis	Sweden
silver medal	Ernest John Obiena	Philippines
bronze medal	Kurtis Marschall	Australia
bronze medal	Christopher Nilsen	United States

The men's pole vault at the 2023 World Athletics Championships was held at the National Athletics Centre in Budapest on 23 and 26 August 2023.

== Summary ==
Rather than apply tiebreakers, all 13 who cleared 5.75m in the preliminary round qualified for the final. Two of them were unable to clear 5.75 again in the final. Through the next height of 5.85m, only five got over the bar. World record holder / defending champion Armand Duplantis and Thibaut Collet remained perfect. At 5.90m Ernest John Obiena, Chris Nilsen and Collet cleared on their first attempt. Kurtis Marschall missed his first attempt, then passed to the next height. Duplantis passed it entirely. At 5.95m, Marschall redeemed his pass, with a first attempt clearance. Marschall is one of only three people to have bested Duplantis in a global competition, at the 2016 U20 Championships when Marschall was 19 and Duplantis was 17. Obiena, Duplantis and Nilsen all followed along making it on their first attempts. Collet missed. The tie was broken putting Duplantis into the lead. Collet passed to the next height, 6 metres. Only Obiena and Duplantis had made 6.00 this year. Duplantis made it easily on his first attempt. Obiena made it on his second. None of the others were able to get over the bar. With two misses each earlier in the competition, Nilsen and Marschall were left with bronze. So Obiena and Duplantis would go to 6.05m. Obiena missed his first attempt, after Duplantis made his first attempt, Obiena passed to the next scheduled height, 6.10m. No previous competition had two competitors left in the competition at 6.10 m (20 ft 0 in). Only Sergey Bubka, Renaud Lavillenie and Duplantis had ever made it. Inexperienced at this height, Obiena missed his first attempt. Duplantis made it to remain perfect through the competition. After Obiena failed on his final attempt, Duplantis was confirmed for the gold medal. Now it was time to move the bar up to a world record attempt. Nobody had ever made an attempt at 6.23 m (20 ft 5 1/4 in) before. With the crowd eagerly watching and clapping in unison, over the next 20 minutes Duplantis made three attempts, but as in all pole vault competitions, they either end in withdrawal or failure. Duplantis failed to set a new record on this night.

== Records ==
Before the competition records were as follows:

Record	Athlete & Nat.	Perf.	Location	Date
World record	Armand Duplantis (SWE)	6.22 m	Clermont-Ferrand, France	25 February 2023
Championship record	Armand Duplantis (SWE)	6.21 m	Eugene, United States	24 July 2022
World Leading	Armand Duplantis (SWE)	6.12 m	Ostrava, Czech Republic	27 June 2023
African Record	Okkert Brits (RSA)	6.03 m	Cologne, Germany	18 August 1995
Asian Record	Ernest John Obiena (PHI)	6.00 m	Bergen, Norway	10 June 2023
North, Central American and Caribbean record	KC Lightfoot (USA)	6.07 m	Nashville, United States	2 June 2023
South American Record	Thiago Braz (BRA)	6.03 m	Rio de Janeiro, Brazil	15 August 2016
European Record	Armand Duplantis (SWE)	6.22 m	Clermont-Ferrand, France	25 February 2023
Oceanian record	Steven Hooker (AUS)	6.06 m (i)	Boston, United States	7 February 2009

== Qualification standard ==
The standard to qualify automatically for entry was 5.81 m.

== Schedule ==
The event schedule, in local time (UTC+2), was as follows:

Date	Time	Round
23 August	10:15	Qualification
26 August	19:25	Final

== Results ==
=== Qualification ===
Qualification: 5.80 m (Q) or at least 12 best performers (q).

Rank	Group	Name	Nationality	5.35	5.55	5.70	5.75	5.80	Mark	Notes
1	A	Armand Duplantis	Sweden	–	o	o	o		5.75	q
1	A	Christopher Nilsen	United States	o	o	o	o		5.75	q
1	A	Ernest John Obiena	Philippines	–	o	–	o		5.75	q
1	A	Kurtis Marschall	Australia	o	o	o	o		5.75	q
5	B	Yao Jie	China	o	xo	o	o		5.75	q
6	B	Zach McWhorter	United States	o	o	xxo	o		5.75	q
6	A	Thibaut Collet	France	xxo	o	o	o		5.75	q
8	A	Ersu Şaşma	Turkey	–	o	o	xo		5.75	q
9	B	Piotr Lisek	Poland	o	xo	o	xo		5.75	q
9	B	Robert Sobera	Poland	o	o	x–	xo		5.75	q, SB
11	A	Ben Broeders	Belgium	–	o	o	xxo		5.75	q
12	A	Claudio Michel Stecchi	Italy	–	o	xo	xxo		5.75	q
13	B	Huang Bokai	China	xo	xo	o	xxo		5.75	q, =PB
14	B	Oleg Zernikel	Germany	o	o	o	xxx		5.70	SB
15	B	Kyle Rademeyer	South Africa	xxo	o	o	xxx		5.70	
16	B	Zachery Bradford	United States	xo	xxo	o	xxx		5.70	
16	B	Menno Vloon	Netherlands	xxo	xo	o	xxx		5.70	
18	A	Zhong Tao	China	o	xo	xo	xxx		5.70	
19	B	Baptiste Thiery	France	o	o	xxo	xxx		5.70	
20	A	Ethan Cormont	France	o	o	xxx			5.55	
20	A	Sondre Guttormsen	Norway	o	o	xx–	x		5.55	
22	B	Juho Alasaari	Finland	o	xxx				5.35	
22	A	Gillian Ladwig	Germany	o	xxx				5.35	
22	A	Germán Chiaraviglio	Argentina	o	xxx				5.35	
22	A	Paweł Wojciechowski	Poland	o	xxx				5.35	
26	A	Pedro Buaró	Portugal	xo	xxx				5.35	
26	B	Vladislav Malykhin	Ukraine	xo	xxx				5.35	
26	B	Hussain Asim Al Hizam	Saudi Arabia	xo	xxx				5.35	
29	B	Eduardo Nápoles	Cuba	xxo	xxx				5.35	
–	B	Emmanouil Karalis	Greece	xxx					NM	
–	B	Dominik Alberto	Switzerland	xxx					NM	
–	B	Pål Haugen Lillefosse	Norway	xxx					NM	
–	A	Urho Kujanpää	Finland	xxx					NM	
–	A	Tomoya Karasawa	Japan	xxx					NM	

=== Final ===
The final started on 26 August at 19:25.

Rank	Name	Nationality	5.55	5.75	5.85	5.90	5.95	6.00	6.05	6.10	6.23	Mark	Notes
1st place, gold medalist(s)	Armand Duplantis	Sweden	o	–	o	–	o	o	o	o	xxx	6.10	
2nd place, silver medalist(s)	Ernest John Obiena	Philippines	o	xo	xo	o	o	xo	x–	xx		6.00	=AR
3rd place, bronze medalist(s)	Kurtis Marschall	Australia	xo	o	o	x–	o	xxx				5.95	=PB
3rd place, bronze medalist(s)	Christopher Nilsen	United States	o	o	xxo	o	o	xxx				5.95	SB
5	Thibaut Collet	France	o	o	o	o	x–	xx				5.90	PB
6	Huang Bokai	China	o	o	xxx							5.75	=PB
7	Ben Broeders	Belgium	xo	o	xxx							5.75	
8	Zach McWhorter	United States	xo	xo	xxx							5.75	
9	Yao Jie	China	o	xxo	xxx							5.75	
9	Claudio Michel Stecchi	Italy	o	xxo	xxx							5.75	
9	Piotr Lisek	Poland	o	xxo	x–	xx						5.75	
12	Robert Sobera	Poland	o	xxx								5.55	
12	Ersu Şaşma	Turkey	o	xxx								5.55	
