= 2015 World Youth Championships in Athletics – Boys' pole vault =

Boys' pole vault at the 2015 World Youth Championships in Athletics
- Venue: Estadio Olímpico Pascual Guerrero
- Dates: 17 and 19 July
- Competitors: 34 from 28 nations
- Winning height: 5.30

Medalists
gold medal	Armand Duplantis	Sweden
silver medal	Vladyslav Malykhin	Ukraine
bronze medal	Emmanouil Karalis	Greece

The boys' pole vault at the 2015 World Youth Championships in Athletics was held at the Estadio Olímpico Pascual Guerrero in Cali, Colombia on 17 and 19 July 2015.

== Records ==
Prior to the competition, the following records were as follows.

World Youth Best	Germán Chiaraviglio (ARG)	5.51	Porto Alegre, Brazil	1 May 2004
Championship Record	Nico Weiler (GER)	5.26	Ostrava, Czech Republic	15 July 2007
World Youth Leading	Masaki Ejima (JPN)	5.32	Yokohama, Japan	13 June 2015

== Results ==
=== Qualification ===
With qualifying standard of 4.95 (Q) or at least the 12 best performers (q) advance to the final.

Rank	Group	Name	Nationality	4.25	4.40	4.55	4.70	4.80	4.90	4.95	Mark	Notes
1	A	Armand Duplantis	Sweden	–	–	–	–	–	o	o	4.95	Q
1	B	Denis Akinshin	Russia	–	–	–	–	–	o	o	4.95	Q
1	A	Emmanouil Karalis	Greece	–	–	–	o	o	o	o	4.95	Q
1	B	Muntaher Faleh Abdulwahid	Iraq	–	–	–	–	o	–	o	4.95	Q, SB
5	A	Joel Benitez	Great Britain	–	–	–	xo	o	o	o	4.95	Q
5	A	Pierre Cottin	France	–	–	–	o	–	xo	o	4.95	Q
7	B	Gauvain Guillon-Romarin	France	–	–	o	o	o	xx–	o	4.95	Q, PB
7	B	Hussain Al-Hizam	Saudi Arabia	–	–	–	o	xxo	o	o	4.95	Q
7	B	Masaki Ejima	Japan	–	–	–	xo	xo	–	o	4.95	Q
10	A	Vladyslav Malykhin	Ukraine	–	–	o	o	o	–	xo	4.95	Q
11	A	Takaaki Yoshida	Japan	–	–	–	xo	xo	xxo	xo	4.95	Q
12	B	Sander Moldau	Estonia	–	o	o	o	o	o	xxo	4.95	Q
13	A	Arturo Zambrano	Ecuador	–	–	–	xo	xo	o	xxx	4.90	PB
14	B	Dimítrios Karayiánnis	Greece	–	–	xo	xxo	o	o	xxx	4.90	
15	B	Max Mandusic	Italy	–	–	xxo	xo	o	xo	xxx	4.90	PB
16	B	Zach Shugart	United States	–	–	xo	o	o	xxx		4.80	
17	A	Dan Bárta	Czech Republic	o	o	xo	xo	o	xxx		4.80	PB
18	B	Đorđe Mijailović	Serbia	o	xxo	o	xo	xo	xxx		4.80	PB
19	B	Frédéric Matthys	Switzerland	o	xo	xo	o	xxx			4.70	
20	A	Francesco Masci	Italy	–	o	xo	xo	xxx			4.70	
21	A	Gim Yeong-ju	South Korea	–	–	o	xxx				4.55	
22	B	Dario Prekl	Croatia	xo	o	o	xxx				4.55	
23	B	Oliver Werthner	Austria	o	xxo	o	xxx				4.55	
24	A	Tom-Linus Humann	Germany	–	–	xo	xxx				4.55	
24	A	Zeki Cem Tenekebüken	Turkey	–	–	xo	xxx				4.55	
26	A	Isidro Leyva	Spain	o	xo	xxo	xxx				4.55	
27	B	Rok Doberšek	Slovenia	–	o	xxx					4.40	
28	A	Jason Clare	Canada	–	xo	xxx					4.40	
29	A	Henry Viáfara	Colombia	o	xxo	xxx					4.40	PB
–	B	Josué Gutiérrez	Peru	x–	–	xxx					NM	
–	B	Philip Kass	Germany	–	–	–	xxx				NM	
–	A	Han Tao	China	–	xxx						NM	
–	B	Taras Shevtsov	Ukraine	–	xxx						NM	
–	A	Yeh Yao-wen	Chinese Taipei								DNS	

=== Final ===
Rank	Name	Nationality	4.70	4.85	5.00	5.10	5.20	5.25	5.30	5.35	Mark	Notes
1st place, gold medalist(s)	Armand Duplantis	Sweden	–	o	xo	o	o	o	o	xxx	5.30	CR
2nd place, silver medalist(s)	Vladyslav Malykhin	Ukraine	o	xo	o	o	xo	xo	xo	xxx	5.30	CR
3rd place, bronze medalist(s)	Emmanouil Karalis	Greece	–	o	xxo	o	xo	x–	xx		5.20	
4	Muntaher Faleh Abdulwahid	Iraq	–	o	o	o	xxx				5.10	SB
5	Pierre Cottin	France	o	o	o	xo	xx–	x			5.10	PB
6	Masaki Ejima	Japan	–	o	xo	xxx					5.00	
7	Gauvain Guillon-Romarin	France	o	o	xxx						4.85	
8	Denis Akinshin	Russia	–	xxo	x–	xx					4.85	
8	Takaaki Yoshida	Japan	–	xxo	xxx						4.85	
10	Sander Moldau	Estonia	xxo	xxx							4.70	
–	Hussain Al-Hizam	Saudi Arabia	–	–	–	xr					NM	
–	Joel Benitez	Great Britain	xxx								NM	
