= Seif Heneida =

Qatari pole vaulter (born 2005)

Personal information
- Native name: سيف الدين عبدالسلام
- Full name: Seifeldin Mohamed Awad Abdesalam
- Nationality: Qatari
- Born: 28 March 2005 (age 21) Egypt

Sport
- Sport: Track and field
- Event: Pole vault
- Club: Aspire Academy
- Coached by: Paweł Szczyrba

Achievements and titles
- Personal best: PV: 5.75 m NR (2025)
Medal record
Men's athletics
Representing Qatar
Asian Indoor Championships
| Silver medal – second place | 2023 Astana | PV |
Asian U20 Championships
| Gold medal – first place | 2023 Yecheon | PV |
Arab U23 Championships
| Gold medal – first place | 2023 Radès | Pole vault |

Seifeldin Abdesalam “Seif Heneida” (born 28 March 2005) is an Egyptian-born Qatari track and field athlete who specializes in pole vaulting.

Seif Hemeida gained his first international experience in 2022 when he won the gold medal in the pole vault at the Asian U18 Championships in Kuwait City with a jump of 5.10 m. The following year he won the silver medal at the Asian Indoor Championships in Astana with a new national record of 5.35 m behind the Saudi Arabian Hussain Al-Hizam. He also won the Arab U23 Championships, in Radès, with 5.30 m. He then won the Asian Junior title in Yecheon by jumping 5.50 m, a new national record.

His older sister Bassant Hemida (representing Egypt) is a sprinter while his older brother Bassem Hemeida (also representing Qatar) is a hurdler.

== International competitions ==
| Year | Competition | Venue | Position | Notes |
Representing Qatar
| 2022 | Asian U18 Championships | Kuwait City, Kuwait | 1st | 5.10 m |
| 2023 | Asian Indoor Championships | Astana, Kazakhstan | 2nd | 5.35 m |
| 2023 | Arab U23 Championships | Radès, Tunisia | 1st | 5.30 m |
| 2023 | West Asian Championships | Doha, Qatar | 1st | 5.20 m |
| 2023 | Arab Championships | Marrakesh, Morocco | 1st | 5.40 m |
| 2023 | Asian U20 Championships | Yecheon, South Korea | 1st | 5.50 m |
| 2023 | Arab Games | Oran, Algeria | 1st | 5.51 m |
| 2023 | Asian Championships | Bangkok, Thailand | 5th | 5.41 m |
| 2023 | Asian Games | Hangzhou, China | 6th | 5.45 m |
| 2024 | Asian Indoor Championships | Tehran, Iran | 4th | 5.55 m |
| 2024 | Asian U20 Championships | Dubai, United Arab Emirates | 1st | 5.51 m |
| 2024 | World U20 Championships | Lima, Peru | 6th | 5.05 m |
| 2025 | Arab Championships | Oran, Algeria | 1st | 5.62 m |
| 2025 | Asian Championships | Gumi, South Korea | 4th | 5.62 m |
| 2025 | World Championships | Tokyo, Japan | 9th | 5.75 m |
| 2026 | GCC Games | Doha, Qatar | 1st | 5.55 m |
| 2026 | Asian U23 Championships | Ordos, China | 1st | 5.45 m |
