= Zhang Wei (pole vaulter) =

Chinese pole vaulter

Medal record

Men's athletics

Representing China

Asian Athletics Championships
Gold medal – first place	2015 Wuhan	Pole vault

Asian Indoor Athletics Championships
Silver medal – second place	2012 Hangzhou	Pole vault

Zhang Wei (Chinese: 张伟; born 22 March 1994) is a Chinese male track and field athlete who competes in the pole vault. He has a personal best of 5.62 m (18 ft 5 1/4 in), set indoors in 2013. He was a silver medallist at the Asian Indoor Athletics Championships in 2012 and won the regional title at the 2015 Asian Athletics Championships.

== Career ==
Zhang was born in the province of Shandong on the east Coast of China. He first came to prominence nationally with a win at the Chinese youth championships in 2010. He proceeded to win the Chinese junior championships and the China City Games title the following year. A best of 5.30 m (17 ft 4 1/2 in) came as part of a fourth-place finish at the Chinese Athletics Championships. He competed abroad for the first time in 2012 and managed a new best of 5.44 m (17 ft 10 in) indoors in Villeurbanne. This served a preparation for the 2012 Asian Indoor Athletics Championships, where the 17-year-old was runner-up behind his older compatriot (and national record holder) Yang Yansheng. Another indoor best of 5.45 m (17 ft 10 1/2 in) followed at the Chinese Taipei vs. China international match a month later.

In the 2012 outdoor season, he defended his Chinese junior title. A debut on the IAAF Diamond League circuit came shortly after and he managed to finish seventh at the Shanghai Golden Grand Prix meet. He had an outright personal best at the Chinese Athletics Grand Prix meeting in his home province in Zibo, winning with a mark of 5.50 m (18 ft 1/2 in). He became the continental champion at the 2012 Asian Junior Athletics Championships with a championship record height. In spite of this success, he failed to register a valid mark at the 2012 World Junior Championships in Athletics. At the end of the season, he equalled his best to place third at the Chinese Championships, behind Yang and Xue Changrui.

Still eighteen, he cleared an Asian junior record of 5.62 m (18 ft 5 1/4 in) at the start of 2013. He won the national junior title for a third time running, but failed to record a height at the 2013 World Championships in Athletics – his senior global debut. He dropped down the national rankings at the 12th Chinese Games, taking sixth place. He topped the national scene for the first time at the 2014 Chinese Championships, taking the national title in a personal best of 5.60 m (18 ft 4 1/4 in).

Zhang maintained his form into the following season and built upon his 2012 junior regional title with a senior gold medal at the 2015 Asian Athletics Championships in Wuhan, matching his best to see off a challenge from Japan's Seito Yamamoto.

== Personal bests ==
- Pole vault outdoor: 5.60 m (18 ft 4 1/4 in) (2015)
- Pole vault indoor: 5.62 m (18 ft 5 1/4 in) (2014)

== National titles ==
- Chinese Athletics Championships
  - Pole vault: 2014

== International competitions ==
Year	Competition	Venue	Position	Notes
2012	Asian Indoor Championships	Hangzhou, China	2nd	5.40
2012	Asian Junior Championships	Colombo, Sri Lanka	1st	5.35 CR
2012	World Junior Championships	Barcelona, Spain	—	NM
2013	World Championships	Moscow, Russia	—	NM
2015	Asian Championships	Wuhan, China	1st	5.60
2015	World Championships	Beijing, China	28th (q)	5.55 m
2019	Asian Championships	Doha, Qatar	2nd	5.66 m
