= EJ Obiena =

Filipino pole vaulter

- EJ Obiena at the Wanda Diamond League 2026 Athletissima.

Personal information
- Full name: Ernest John Uy Obiena
- Nickname: EJ
- Nationality: Filipino
- Born: November 17, 1995 (age 30) Tondo, Manila, Philippines
- Height: 1.88 m (6 ft 2 in)

Chinese name
- Traditional Chinese: 蔡華強
- Simplified Chinese: 蔡华强
Transcriptions
Standard Mandarin
- Hanyu Pinyin: Cài Huáqiáng
Southern Min
- Hokkien POJ: Chhòa Hôa-kiông

Sport
- Country: Philippines
- Sport: Track and field
- Event: Pole vaulting
- College team: Ateneo de Manila University; University of Santo Tomas
- Coached by: Emerson Obiena; Vitaly Petrov (2014)

Achievements and titles
- Highest world ranking: No. 2 (2023)
- Personal bests: Pole vault: 6.00m (2023, NR and AR); 110 m hurdles 14.39 (2017)
Medal record
Men's athletics
Representing the Philippines
Event	1st	2nd	3rd
World Athletics Championships	0	1	1
Asian Games	2	0	0
Asian Athletics Championships	3	0	1
Asian Indoor Athletics Championships	1	0	0
Universiade	1	0	0
Southeast Asian Games	4	1	0
Total	11	2	2
World Championships
Silver medal – second place	2023 Budapest	Pole vault
Bronze medal – third place	2022 Eugene	Pole vault
Asian Games
Gold medal – first place	2022 Hangzhou	Pole vault
Gold medal – first place	2026 Aichi–Nagoya	Pole vault
Asian Championships
Gold medal – first place	2019 Doha	Pole vault
Gold medal – first place	2023 Bangkok	Pole vault
Gold medal – first place	2025 Gumi	Pole vault
Bronze medal – third place	2017 Bhubaneswar	Pole vault
Asian Indoor Athletics Championships
Gold medal – first place	2026 Tianjin	Pole vault
Universiade
Gold medal – first place	2019 Naples	Pole vault
Southeast Asian Games
Gold medal – first place	2019 Philippines	Pole vault
Gold medal – first place	2021 Vietnam	Pole vault
Gold medal – first place	2023 Cambodia	Pole vault
Gold medal – first place	2025 Thailand	Pole vault
Silver medal – second place	2015 Singapore	Pole vault

Ernest John Uy Obiena (born November 17, 1995) is a Filipino pole vaulter. He is ranked world No. 11 in men's pole vault by the World Athletics Rankings as of September 22, 2026.

Obiena currently holds the Asian record with his clearance of 6.00 meters at the 2023 World Athletics Championships where he won the silver medal. He also holds the Philippine national record with a clearance of 5.93 meters at the Golden Rooftop Challenge in Innsbruck, Austria on September 11, 2021. Obiena is the current two-time champion and record holder (5.91 m) of the Asian Games. He is also the two-time defending champion and current record holder (5.91 m) in the Asian Athletics Championships and three-time defending champion and current record holder (5.65 m) in the SEA Games. He also won the gold medal in the 2019 Summer Universiade held in Naples, Italy and has competed in the 2020 and 2024 Summer Olympics.

Obiena is the first Filipino to receive a scholarship from the International Athletic Association Federation (IAAF).

== Early life and education ==
Obiena was born to track and field athletes Emerson Obiena and Jeanette Uy, a former hurdler both parents of Chinese Filipino heritage on November 17, 1995, in Tondo, Manila. Obiena attended Chiang Kai Shek College, a Chinese Filipino school for his secondary education, and later entered the University of Santo Tomas for his undergraduate studies.

He has been dating Caroline Joyeux, a triple jumper and Technische Universität Berlin student from Berlin, since 2022.

== Pole vault career ==
=== Early years ===
Obiena first took up pole vaulting when he was eight years old, but initially focused on hurdles. His father, Emerson Obiena served as his coach until he was 18 years old. Obiena competed in the 100 and 400 meter hurdles events for his high school, Chiang Kai Shek College. Unable to qualify for regional meets, he decided to return to pole vaulting when he was in his last years in high school, in a bid to secure a college scholarship.

In college, Obiena started his career at Ateneo de Manila University where he played one season before transferring to University of Santo Tomas, where he competed for them at the University Athletic Association of the Philippines (UAAP).

=== National team ===
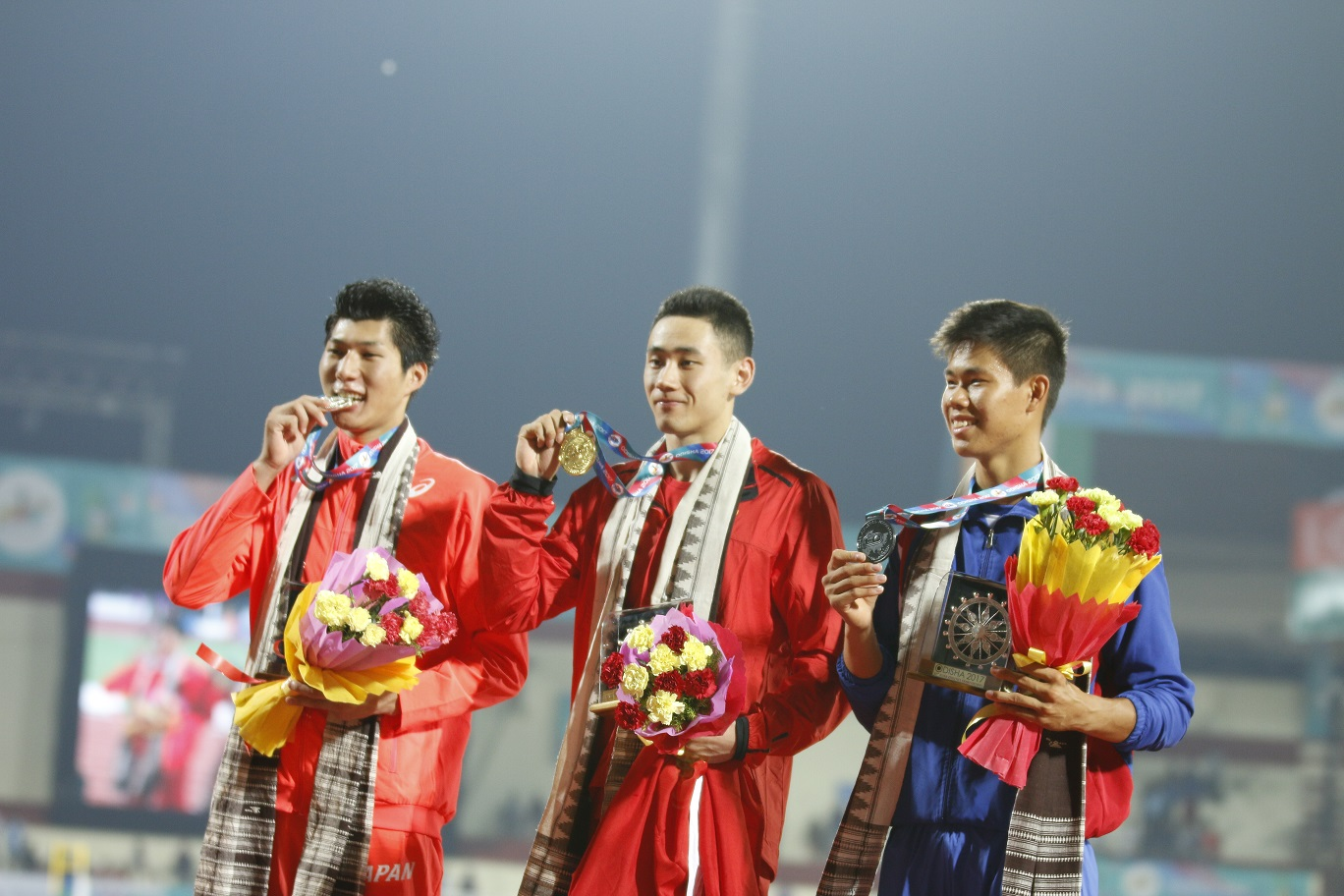
Obiena (right) at the 2017 Asian Athletics Championships.

In early 2014, Obiena was able to meet Ukrainian pole vaulter Sergey Bubka who was visiting the Philippines. Originally, he only intended to get an autograph from Bubka, but learned from him of an opportunity to train in Italy. In the same year for three months, Obiena travelled to Italy to train under coach Vitaly Petrov in Formia, who also previously coached Bubka. On July 20, 2014, at the PATAFA weekly relays held at the PhilSports Football and Athletics Stadium, Obiena broke the national record for pole vault by registering 5.01 meters. The previous record was 5.0 meters by Edward Lasquete at the 1992 Summer Olympics in Barcelona, Spain. The junior national record was also broken, since Obiena at that time was still 18 years old. The previous record was 4.31 meters set three years before.

He later broke his own record several times in 2014 alone (5.05, 5.05, 5.15, 5.20, 5.21). By the time Obiena became ineligible for the national junior record, the record was 5.21 which Obiena set himself.

In the 2015 Southeast Asian Games, Obiena won a silver medal with a leap of 5.25 meters, then his personal record.

Obiena won a gold medal in the 2016 Philippine National Games Finals in Lingayen, Pangasinan after breaking a new personal record (5.47 meters), despite problems with a broken pole.

Obiena won gold in the men's pole vault event at the 2019 Summer Universiade setting a new national record of 5.76 meters. He secured a berth in the 2020 Summer Olympics by surpassing the qualifying standard by making a 5.81 meters height in a tournament in Chiara, Italy on September 3, 2019. The height was also a national record.

At the 2019 World Athletics Championships he failed to advance to the final round by finishing 15th out of 35 entrants through his 5.60 meters finish.

The COVID-19 pandemic caused the postponement of the Olympics and travel restrictions imposed by countries in response to the health crisis posed logistical issues to Obiena's preparations. For most of 2020, Obiena spent his time training in Formia, Italy, and was unable to go back to the Philippines during the Christmas season. He trained under American conditioning coach James Michael Lafferty and Nutritionist Carol Lafferty; along with Brazilian Thiago Braz as his training partner. Competing in the 2020 Summer Olympics in Tokyo, Obiena managed to advance to the final of the pole vault competition but failed to make the podium.

Obiena set a then Asian record in pole vault when he lifted his best vault all the way to 5.93 meters at the International Golden Roof Challenge in Innsbruck, Austria on September 12, 2021. He won the tournament. This record was later broken on July 25, 2022, when Obiena lifted his best vault all the way to 5.94 meters at the 2022 World Athletics Championships in Eugene, Oregon, United States. He won a bronze medal, becoming the first Filipino to win a medal in the tournament.

In June 2023, Obiena cleared 6 meters for the first time at the Sparebanken Vest Bergen Jump Challenge in Norway also resetting the Asian record. He was able to accomplish said feat due to shifting to a 20-step technique from the previous 18-steps approach. He was then ranked world No. 2 in men's pole vault by the 2023 World Athletics Rankings, just behind Armand Duplantis. At the 2023 World Athletics Championships in Budapest, Obiena won silver in the men's pole vault with a clearance of 6.00 m.

Competing in the 2024 Summer Olympics in Paris, Obiena advanced to the finals after ranking 7th in the qualification round. He finished fourth in the overall competition at 5.90 meters. He was then ranked world No. 3 in the 2024 World Athletics Rankings. Obiena would decide to sit out for the rest of the 2024 season due to his back injury after the Athletissima of the 2024 Diamond League.

Obiena defended his Asian Championship title by winning the gold in the 2025 edition. In September 2025, Obiena finished 18th at the 2025 World Athletics Championships pole vault qualifiers missing the chance for a third consecutive medal finish. This was followed by the Atletang Ayala World Pole Vault Challenge at the Ayala Triangle in Makati. The tournament which Obiena helped organized was a bronze category event of the World Athletics Continental Tour.

At the 2026 Asian Games in Nagoya, Japan, Obiena won the gold medal in men's pole vault after clearing 5.91 m (19.4 ft). He set a new Asian Games record despite the rain.

=== Coaches ===
Obiena trained under coach Vitaly Petrov from 2014 until 2026. Obiena's coaching team includes his father, Emerson Obiena, mentor and conditioning coach James Michael Lafferty, physiotherapist Francesco Viscusi, osteopath Antonio Guglietta, nutritionist Carol Lafferty and sport psychologist Dr. Sheryll Casuga. In 2026, he moved to Athens, Greece to train under coach Marcin Szczepanski.

=== Dispute with PATAFA ===
In November 2021, the Philippine Athletics Track and Field Association (PATAFA) publicly escalated an accounting dispute involving late payments to Obiena's coach, Vitaly Petrov. Petrov later denied there was any payment issue with Obiena. Philippine Senators quickly came to Obiena's defense, calling unproven accusations "harassment" against an athlete considered a national treasure and passing a motion to recall the budget of the PSC. The Senators later approved the PSC budget with the condition that PATAFA will “rectify the grave injustice” done to Obiena's reputation. During congressional hearings, witnesses testified that PATAFA's payment system is broken.

After an investigation by its Ethics Committee, the Philippine Olympic Committee (POC) declared PATAFA's president Philip Juico persona non grata for his role in the harassment of Obiena. The investigation of the POC's ethics committee concluded that Juico had harassed the athlete by making "malicious public accusations".

On March 30, 2022, the Philippine Sports Commission announced that both parties reached an agreement during a mediation process. Obiena will be endorsed by PATAFA in any future competitions.

== Competition record ==
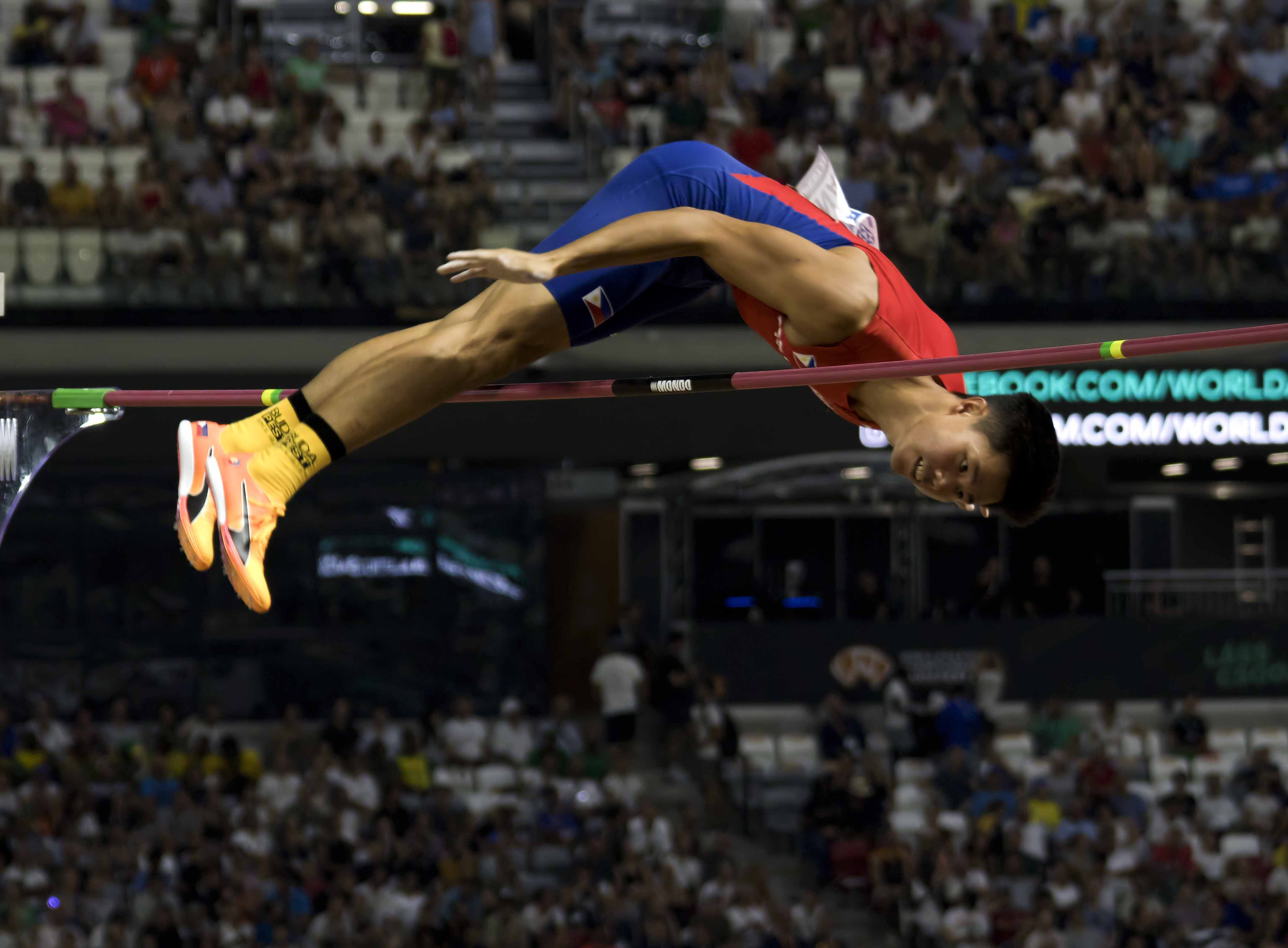
Obiena competing at the 2023 World Athletics Championships in Budapest

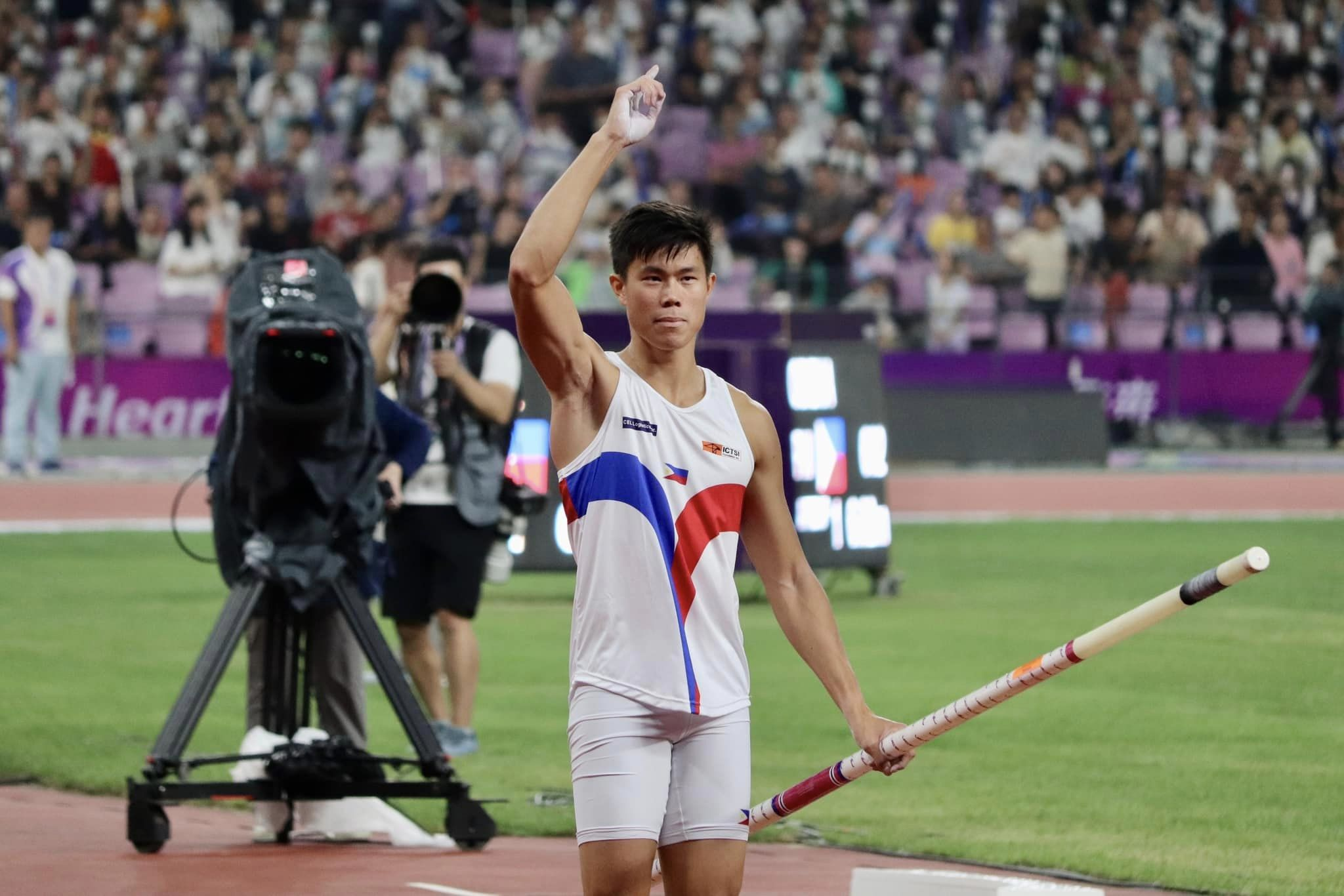
Obiena at the 19th Asian Games in Hangzhou, China

Year	Competition	Venue	Position	Notes
Representing the Philippines
2013	Southeast Asian Games	Naypyidaw, Myanmar	4th	4.90 m
2015	Southeast Asian Games	Singapore	2nd	5.25 m
2016	Asian Indoor Championships	Doha, Qatar	4th	5.40 m
2017	Asian Championships	Bhubaneswar, India	3rd	5.50 m
2018	Asian Games	Jakarta, Indonesia	7th	5.30 m
2019	Asian Championships	Doha, Qatar	1st	5.71 m
2019	Southeast Asian Games	Philippines	1st	5.45 m
2019	Universiade	Naples, Italy	1st	5.76 m
2019	World Championships	Doha, Qatar	15th (q)	5.60 m
2021	Olympic Games	Tokyo, Japan	11th	5.70 m
2022	Southeast Asian Games	Vietnam	1st	5.46 m
2022	World Championships	Eugene, Oregon	3rd	5.94 m
2023	Southeast Asian Games	Phnom Penh, Cambodia	1st	5.65 m
2023	Asian Championships	Bangkok, Thailand	1st	5.91 m
2023	World Championships	Budapest, Hungary	2nd	6.00 m
2023	Asian Games	Hangzhou, China	1st	5.90 m
2024	World Indoor Championships	Glasgow, United Kingdom	9th	5.65 m
2024	Olympic Games	Paris, France	4th	5.90 m
2025	Asian Championships	Gumi, South Korea	1st	5.77 m
2025	World Championships	Tokyo, Japan	18th (q)	5.55 m
2025	Southeast Asian Games	Bangkok, Thailand	1st	5.70 m
2026	Asian Indoor Championships	Tianjin, China	1st	5.70 m
2026	World Indoor Championships	Toruń, Poland	9th	5.70 m
2026	Asian Games	Nagoya, Japan	1st	5.91 m

== Awards and accolades ==
- Philippine Sportswriters Association Athlete of the Year (2023)
- Pasyon Kay EJ (At sa mga Atletang Pinoy sa Paris Olympics) (2024) - by Rio Alma (Virgilio S. Almario)

== See also ==
- List of Asian Athletics Championships records
- List of Filipino records in athletics
