= Athletics at the 2017 Summer Universiade – Men's pole vault =

The men's pole vault event at the 2017 Summer Universiade was held on 25 and 27 August at the Taipei Stadium.

== Medalists ==
Gold	Silver	Bronze
Diogo Ferreira Portugal	Sergey Grigoryev Kazakhstan	Claudio Stecchi Italy

== Results ==
=== Qualification ===
Qualification: 5.30 m (Q) or at least 12 best (q) qualified for the final.

Rank	Group	Athlete	Nationality	4.90	5.00	5.10	5.20	5.30	Result	Notes
1	A	Mathieu Collet	France (FRA)	–	o	–	o	o	5.30	Q
1	B	Claudio Stecchi	Italy (ITA)	–	–	–	o	o	5.30	Q
3	B	Angus Armstrong	Australia (AUS)	–	–	xo	o	o	5.30	Q
3	B	Masaki Ejima	Japan (JPN)	–	–	–	xo	o	5.30	Q
3	A	Bruno Spinelli	Brazil (BRA)	–	o	–	xo	o	5.30	Q
3	A	Sergey Grigoryev	Kazakhstan (KAZ)	–	xo	–	o	o	5.30	Q
3	B	Deryk Theodore	Canada (CAN)	–	o	–	xo	o	5.30	Q
8	B	Nikita Filippov	Kazakhstan (KAZ)	–	xxo	–	o	o	5.30	Q
9	B	Jorge Luna	Mexico (MEX)	xo	xxo	–	o	o	5.30	Q
10	B	Diogo Ferreira	Portugal (POR)	–	–	–		xo	5.30	Q
11	A	Nicholas Southgate	New Zealand (NZL)	–	–	o	xxo	xo	5.30	Q
12	B	Koen van der Wijst	Netherlands (NED)	o	–	xo	xo	xxo	5.30	Q
13	A	Han Du-hyeon	South Korea (KOR)	–	–	xxo	xo	xxx	5.20	
14	A	Hichem-Khalil Cherabi	Algeria (ALG)	–	xxo	xo	xxx		5.10	
15	A	Ján Zmoray	Slovakia (SVK)	o	o	xo	xxx		5.10	
16	A	Spencer Allen	Canada (CAN)	o	–	xxx			4.90	
17	A	Stephen Clough	Australia (AUS)	xo	xxx				4.90	
	A	Mateusz Jerzy	Poland (POL)	–	–	–	xxx		NM	
	A	Vladyslav Malykhin	Ukraine (UKR)	–	–	–	xxx		NM	
	B	Robert Sobera	Poland (POL)	–	–	–	–	xxx	NM	
	B	Ambrož Tičar	Slovenia (SLO)	xxx					NM	
	B	Charlie Myers	Great Britain (GBR)						DNS	

=== Final ===
Official Video

Rank	Athlete	Nationality	5.00	5.10	5.20	5.30	5.40	5.50	5.55	5.60	Result	Notes
1st place, gold medalist(s)	Diogo Ferreira	Portugal (POR)	–	o	–	o	xo	o	xo	xxx	5.55	
2nd place, silver medalist(s)	Sergey Grigoryev	Kazakhstan (KAZ)	o	–	o	–	o	o	–	xxx	5.50	
3rd place, bronze medalist(s)	Claudio Stecchi	Italy (ITA)	–	o	–	o	o	xxr			5.40	
4	Masaki Ejima	Japan (JPN)	–	–	xxo	–	o	xxx			5.40	
5	Angus Armstrong	Australia (AUS)	–	xo	xo	xo	xxx				5.30	
5	Nikita Filippov	Kazakhstan (KAZ)	–	xxo	–	xo	xxx				5.30	
7	Jorge Luna	Mexico (MEX)	o	–	o	xxx					5.20	
8	Bruno Spinelli	Brazil (BRA)	xo	–	xxo	xxx					5.30	
9	Nicholas Southgate	New Zealand (NZL)	–	o	–	xxx					5.10	
10	Deryk Theodore	Canada (CAN)	–	xo	–	xxx					5.10	
	Mathieu Collet	France (FRA)	–	–	xxx						NM	
	Koen van der Wijst	Netherlands (NED)	xxx								NM	

Notes r: retired
