= 2019 Asian Athletics Championships – Men's pole vault =

Men's pole vault at the 2019 Asian Athletics Championships
- Venue: Khalifa International Stadium
- Location: Doha, Qatar
- Dates: 21 April
- Competitors: 11 from 7 nations
- Winning height: 5.71 m CR, NR

Medalists
gold medal	EJ Obiena	Philippines
silver medal	Zhang Wei	China
bronze medal	Huang Bokai	China

The men's pole vault at the 2019 Asian Athletics Championships was held on 21 April. It was won by Ernest John Obiena of the Philippines with a new Championships record of 5.71 metres, which was also the new national record for his country. He was followed on the podium by two Chinese vaulters, Zhang Wei and Huang Bokai, both recording season's bests. The defending champion, Ding Bangchao, also of China, did not compete.

== Records ==
Records before the 2019 Asian Athletics Championships
Record	Athlete (nation)	Height (m)	Location	Date
World record	Renaud Lavillenie (FRA)	6.16	Donetsk, Ukraine	15 February 2014
Asian record	EJ Obiena (PHI)	5.92	Dijon, France	13 June 1992
Championship record	Grigoriy Yegorov (KAZ)	5.70	Manila, Philippines	3 December 1993
World leading	Piotr Lisek (POL)	5.93	Clermont-Ferrand, France	24 February 2019
Asian leading	Seito Yamamoto (JPN)	5.71	Reno, United States	18 January 2019

== Results ==
Rank	Name	Nationality	5.01	5.16	5.31	5.41	5.51	5.56	5.61	5.66	5.71	5.76	Result	Notes
1st place, gold medalist(s)	Ernest John Obiena	Philippines	–	–	o	xo	o	xxo	xxo	x–	o	x	5.71	CR, NR
2nd place, silver medalist(s)	Zhang Wei	China	–	–	o	o	xo	–	o	o	xxx		5.66	SB
3rd place, bronze medalist(s)	Huang Bokai	China	–	o	o	o	o	xo	xxo	o	xx–	x	5.66	SB
4	Jin Min-sub	South Korea	–	–	o	–	xxo	–	o	–	xxx		5.61	SB
5	Patsapong Amsamang	Thailand	o	–	o	o	o	xxx					5.51	SB
6	Masaki Ejima	Japan	–	–	o	xxo	o	xxx					5.51	
7	Seito Yamamoto	Japan	–	–	o	–	xo	–	xxx				5.51	
8	Sergey Grigoryev	Kazakhstan	o	o	xxo	–	xo	–	xxx				5.51	
9	Danil Polyanskiy	Kazakhstan	o	o	o	xxx							5.31	SB
10	Porranot Purahong	Thailand	x–	o	xxx								5.16	SB
	Muntadher Falih Abdulwahid	Iraq	–	xxx									NM	
