= 2023 Asian Athletics Championships – Men's pole vault =

Men's pole vault at the 2023 Asian Athletics Championships
- Venue: National Stadium
- Location: Bangkok, Thailand
- Dates: 16 July
- Competitors: 12 from 10 nations
- Winning height: 5.91 m CR

Medalists
gold medal	EJ Obiena	Philippines
silver medal	Hussain Asim Al-Hizam	Saudi Arabia
bronze medal	Huang Bokai	China

The men's pole vault event at the 2023 Asian Athletics Championships was held on 16 July.

== Records ==
Records before the 2023 Asian Athletics Championships
Record	Athlete (nation)	Height (m)	Location	Date
World record	Armand Duplantis (SWE)	6.22	Clermont-Ferrand, France	25 February 2023
Asian record	EJ Obiena (PHI)	6.00	Bergen, Norway	10 June 2023
Championship record	EJ Obiena (PHI)	5.71	Doha, Qatar	21 April 2019
World leading	Armand Duplantis (SWE)	6.22	Clermont-Ferrand, France	25 February 2023
Asian leading	EJ Obiena (PHI)	6.00	Bergen, Norway	10 June 2023

== Results ==
Rank	Name	Nationality	4.61	4.81	5.01	5.16	5.31	5.41	5.51	5.56	5.61	5.66	5.80	5.91	6.02	Result	Notes
1st place, gold medalist(s)	Ernest John Obiena	Philippines	–	–	–	–	–	–	o	–	–	o	o	xo	xxx	5.91	CR
2nd place, silver medalist(s)	Hussain Asim Al-Hizam	Saudi Arabia	–	–	–	–	xo	xx–	o	o	xxx					5.56	
3rd place, bronze medalist(s)	Huang Bokai	China	–	–	–	–	xo	xo	o	–	xxx					5.51	
4	Tomoya Karasawa	Japan	–	–	–	o	o	xxo	o	xx–	x					5.51	
5	Seifeldin Heneida Abdesalam	Qatar	–	–	–	o	o	o	xxx							5.41	
6	Phassapong Unsum-Ang	Thailand	–	–	–	o	o	–	x–	–	xx					5.31	
7	Han Du-hyun	South Korea	–	–	o	xo	o	xxx								5.31	
8	Huang Cheng-chi	Chinese Taipei	–	o	o	xo	xxx									5.16	
9	Ivan Tovchenik	Kazakhstan	–	–	xxo	xxx										5.01	
	Yao Jie	China	–	–	–	–	–	–	xxx							NM	
	Kasinpob Chomchanad	Thailand	–	–	–	–	xxx									NM	
	Cheung Pui Yin	Hong Kong	xxx													NM	
