= Athletics at the 2020 Summer Olympics – Men's pole vault =

Men's pole vault at the Games of the XXXII Olympiad
- Olympic Athletics
- Venue: Japan National Stadium
- Dates: 31 July 2021 (qualifying); 3 August 2021 (final)
- Competitors: 29 from 18 nations
- Winning height: 6.02 m

Medalists
1st place, gold medalist(s)		Armand Duplantis	Sweden
2nd place, silver medalist(s)		Chris Nilsen	United States
3rd place, bronze medalist(s)		Thiago Braz	Brazil

Official Video Highlights

The men's pole vault event at the 2020 Summer Olympics took place between 31 July and 3 August 2021 at the Japan National Stadium. 29 athletes from 18 nations competed. Armand Duplantis of Sweden won gold, with Christopher Nilsen of the United States earning silver and Thiago Braz of Brazil taking bronze. It was Sweden's first victory in the event and first medal of any color in the men's pole vault since 1952. Braz, who had won in 2016, became the ninth man to earn multiple medals in the pole vault.

== Summary ==
All of the 2016 podium returned to Tokyo; Thiago Braz da Silva, Renaud Lavillenie, and Sam Kendricks. Kendricks tested positive for COVID-19 after arriving in Tokyo and was not allowed to compete. But the old guard of the sport had been supplanted by a new phenom, Armand Duplantis, a 21 year old who had 18 years of vaulting experience, setting age group world records since the age of 7. In 2019 he won silver at the World Championships. In 2020, he took Lavillenie's world record.

It took a clean round of 5.65 metres to get into the final, 11 of the 14 finalists cleared 5.75 in qualifying. Seven jumpers made 5.80 metres, with Lavillenie passing and failing at the next heights. At 5.87 metres, Duplantis passed, only Braz and Chris Nilsen cleared. Duplantis cleared 5.92 metres on only his third jump of the competition. Nilsen cleared on his second attempt. Braz couldn't, leaving him for the bronze. Duplantis cleared 5.97 metres and Nilsen answered with a personal best. At 6.02 metres, Duplantis cleared again, still perfect. Nilsen took three attempts to join the 6 metres club but couldn't. Now as the winner, Duplantis could choose his next height to attempt. Instead of attempting to beat Braz' Olympic Record of 6.03 metres, he asked for 6.19 m (20 ft 3 1/2 in), a new world record. His first attempt saw his hips and body up around 6.50m, but he came back brushing the bar on his way down. He aborted his second attempt and the third was close.

Silver medalist Nielsen was full of praise for the winner, Armand Duplantis. He compared the competition against Duplantis that evening as being a regular footballer "trying to emulate Lionel Messi or Cristiano Ronaldo" and that his superiority over the world's best pole vaulters was "impressive and ridiculous".

== Background ==
This was the 29th appearance of the event, which is one of 12 athletics events to have been held at every Summer Olympics.

2016 bronze medalist and 2017 and 2019 world champion Sam Kendricks of the United States qualified but had to withdraw due to a positive COVID-19 test.

For the second consecutive Games, no nations made their men's pole vault debut. The United States made its 28th appearance, most of any nation, having missed only the boycotted 1980 Games.

== Qualification ==
A National Olympic Committee (NOC) could enter up to 3 qualified athletes in the men's pole vault event if all athletes meet the entry standard or qualify by ranking during the qualifying period. (The limit of 3 has been in place since the 1930 Olympic Congress.) The qualifying standard is 5.80 metres. This standard was "set for the sole purpose of qualifying athletes with exceptional performances unable to qualify through the IAAF World Rankings pathway." The world rankings, based on the average of the best five results for the athlete over the qualifying period and weighted by the importance of the meet, will then be used to qualify athletes until the cap of 32 is reached.

The qualifying period was originally from 1 May 2019 to 29 June 2020. Due to the COVID-19 pandemic, the period was suspended from 6 April 2020 to 30 November 2020, with the end date extended to 29 June 2021. The world rankings period start date was also changed from 1 May 2019 to 30 June 2020; athletes who had met the qualifying standard during that time were still qualified, but those using world rankings would not be able to count performances during that time. The qualifying time standards could be obtained in various meets during the given period that have the approval of the IAAF. Both outdoor and indoor meets are eligible. The most recent Area Championships may be counted in the ranking, even if not during the qualifying period.

NOCs can also use their universality place—each NOC can enter one male athlete regardless of time if they had no male athletes meeting the entry standard for an athletics event—in the pole vault.

Entry number: 32. Qualified by Entry Standard: 22. By World Rankings Position, to complete the required entry number: 10. By Universality Places: 0

Qualification standard	No. of athletes	NOC	Nominated athletes
Entry standard – 5.80
Entry standard – 5.80	3	France	Ethan Cormont; Renaud Lavillenie; Valentin Lavillenie
Entry standard – 5.80	3	Germany	Torben Blech; Bo Kanda Lita Baehre; Oleg Zernikel
Entry standard – 5.80	3	United States	~~Sam Kendricks~~; KC Lightfoot; Chris Nilsen
Entry standard – 5.80	2	Brazil	Thiago Braz; Augusto Dutra
Entry standard – 5.80	2	Poland	Piotr Lisek; Paweł Wojciechowski
Entry standard – 5.80	1	Australia	Kurtis Marschall
Entry standard – 5.80	1	Belgium	Ben Broeders
Entry standard – 5.80	1	Great Britain	Harry Coppell
Entry standard – 5.80	1	Netherlands	Menno Vloon
Entry standard – 5.80	1	Norway	Sondre Guttormsen
Entry standard – 5.80	1	Philippines	EJ Obiena
Entry standard – 5.80	1	~~ROC~~	~~Timur Morgunov~~
Entry standard – 5.80	1	South Korea	Jin Min-sub
Entry standard – 5.80	1	Sweden	Armand Duplantis
Entry standard – 5.80	1	Turkey	Ersu Şaşma
World ranking	2	Greece	Konstantinos Filippidis; Emmanouil Karalis
World ranking	2	Japan	Seito Yamamoto; Masaki Ejima
World ranking	1	Argentina	Germán Chiaraviglio
World ranking	1	China	Huang Bokai
World ranking	1	Italy	Claudio Stecchi
World ranking	1	Netherlands	Rutger Koppelaar
World ranking	1	Poland	Robert Sobera
World ranking	1	Sweden	~~Melker Svärd Jacobsson~~
Total	31		

== Competition format ==
The 2020 competition continued to use the two-round format introduced in 1912. There were two distinct rounds of vaulting with results cleared between rounds. Vaulters were eliminated if they had three consecutive failures, whether at a single height or between multiple heights if they attempt to advance before clearing a height.

The qualifying round had the bar set at various heights up to a qualifying standard of 5.80 metres. All jumpers clearing that standard advanced to the final. A minimum of 12 jumpers advanced; if fewer than 12 achieve the qualifying standard, the top 12 (including ties after use of the countback rules) advanced. It has been common in recent Games for few enough vaulters to achieve the last height below the qualifying standard that none even attempt the qualifying standard.

The final had jumps starting typically just below the qualifying standard and increasing gradually. The final continued until all jumpers were eliminated.

== Records ==
Prior to this competition, the existing world, Olympic, and area records were as follows.

World record	Armand Duplantis (SWE)	6.18	Glasgow, United Kingdom	15 February 2020
Olympic record	Thiago Braz da Silva (BRA)	6.03	Rio de Janeiro, Brazil	15 August 2016

Area	Height (m)	Athlete	Nation
Africa (records)	6.03	Okkert Brits	South Africa
Asia (records)	5.92	Igor Potapovich	Kazakhstan
Europe (records)	6.18 WR	Armand Duplantis	Sweden
North, Central America and Caribbean (records)	6.06	Sam Kendricks	United States
Oceania (records)	6.06	Steven Hooker	Australia
South America (records)	6.03 OR	Thiago Braz	Brazil

== Schedule ==
All times are Japan Standard Time (UTC+9)

The men's pole vault took place over two separate days.

Date	Time	Round
Saturday, 31 July 2021	9:00	Qualifying
Tuesday, 3 August 2021	19:00	Final

== Results ==
=== Qualifying ===
Qualification Rules: Qualifying performance 5.80 (Q) or at least 12 best performers (q) advance to the Final.

Rank	Group	Athlete	Nation	5.30	5.50	5.65	5.75	Height	Notes
1	B	Bo Kanda Lita Baehre	Germany	–	o	o	o	5.75	q
1	B	Christopher Nilsen	United States	–	o	o	o	5.75	q
3	B	Armand Duplantis	Sweden	–	xo	o	o	5.75	q
3	A	KC Lightfoot	United States	o	xo	o	o	5.75	q
5	A	Kurtis Marschall	Australia	–	o	xxo	o	5.75	q
6	A	Renaud Lavillenie	France	–	xxo	xo	o	5.75	q
7	B	Menno Vloon	Netherlands	o	o	o	xo	5.75	q
8	B	Thiago Braz	Brazil	–	xo	o	xo	5.75	q
8	A	Emmanouil Karalis	Greece	o	o	xo	xo	5.75	q, SB
10	A	Ernest John Obiena	Philippines	–	o	o	xxo	5.75	q
11	B	Piotr Lisek	Poland	–	o	xxo	xxo	5.75	q
12	B	Harry Coppell	Great Britain	o	o	o	xxx	5.65	q
12	B	Ersu Şaşma	Turkey	–	o	o	xxx	5.65	q
12	A	Oleg Zernikel	Germany	–	o	o	xxx	5.65	q
15	A	Robert Sobera	Poland	–	x–	o	xxr	5.65	
16	A	Augusto Dutra de Oliveira	Brazil	o	o	xo	xxx	5.65	
17	A	Valentin Lavillenie	France	o	o	xxo	xxx	5.65	
18	B	Ben Broeders	Belgium	–	xo	xxo	xxx	5.65	
19	B	Matt Ludwig	United States	o	o	xxx	—N/a	5.50	
19	A	Jin Min-sub	South Korea	o	o	xxx	—N/a	5.50	
21	B	Huang Bokai	China	xo	o	xxx	—N/a	5.50	=SB
22	B	Konstantinos Filippidis	Greece	o	xo	xxx	—N/a	5.50	
22	B	Ethan Cormont	France	o	xo	xxx	—N/a	5.50	
24	A	Sondre Guttormsen	Norway	–	xxo	x–	—N/a	5.50	
25	A	Torben Blech	Germany	o	xxx	—N/a		5.30	
25	A	Masaki Ejima	Japan	o	xxx	—N/a		5.30	
25	B	Seito Yamamoto	Japan	o	xxx	—N/a		5.30	
28	A	Pawel Wojciechowski	Poland	xo	xxx	—N/a		5.30	
—	A	Claudio Stecchi	Italy	xxx	—N/a			NM	
—	B	Germán Chiaraviglio	Argentina	—N/a				DNS	

=== Final ===
Rank	Athlete	Nation	5.55	5.70	5.80	5.87	5.92	5.97	6.02	6.19	Height	Notes
1st place, gold medalist(s)	Armand Duplantis	Sweden	o	—	o	—	o	o	o	xxx	6.02	
2nd place, silver medalist(s)	Christopher Nilsen	United States	o	o	xo	o	xo	o	xxx	—N/a	5.97	PB
3rd place, bronze medalist(s)	Thiago Braz	Brazil	o	xo	xo	o	xxx	—N/a			5.87	SB
4	Emmanouil Karalis	Greece	o	o	o	xxx	—N/a				5.80	=PB
4	KC Lightfoot	United States	o	o	o	xxx	—N/a				5.80	
6	Piotr Lisek	Poland	o	x–	o	xxx	—N/a				5.80	
7	Harry Coppell	Great Britain	o	xo	xo	xxx	—N/a				5.80	SB
8	Renaud Lavillenie	France	—	o	—	x–	xx	—N/a			5.70	
9	Oleg Zernikel	Germany	xo	o	xxx	—N/a					5.70	
10	Ersu Sasma	Turkey	o	xo	xxx	—N/a					5.70	
11	Bo Kanda Lita Baehre	Germany	o	xxo	xxx	—N/a					5.70	
11	Ernest John Obiena	Philippines	o	xxo	xxx	—N/a					5.70	
13	Menno Vloon	Netherlands	o	xxx	—N/a						5.55	
—	Kurtis Marschall	Australia	xxx	—N/a							NM	
