= Athletics at the 2022 Asian Games – Men's pole vault =

Men's pole Vault at the 2022 Asian Games
- Venue: Hangzhou Olympic Expo Main Stadium
- Date: 30 September 2023
- Competitors: 12 from 10 nations

Medalists
gold medal	EJ Obiena	Philippines
silver medal	Huang Bokai	China
bronze medal	Hussain Al-Hizam	Saudi Arabia

The men's pole vault competition at the 2022 Asian Games took place on 30 September 2023 at the HOC Stadium, Hangzhou.

== Schedule ==
All times are China Standard Time (UTC+08:00)

Date	Time	Event
Saturday, 30 September 2023	19:05	Final

== Records ==
Prior to this competition, the existing world, Asian and Games records were as follows.

World Record	Armand Duplantis (SWE)	6.22	Clermont-Ferrand, France	25 February 2023
Asian Record	EJ Obiena (PHI)	6.00	Bergen, Norway; Budapest, Hungary	10 June 2023; 26 August 2023
Games Record	Seito Yamamoto (JPN)	5.70	Jakarta, Indonesia	29 August 2018

== Results ==
Legend

- NM — No mark

Rank	Athlete	Attempt										Result	Notes
Rank	Athlete	4.80	5.00	5.15	5.30	5.45	5.55	5.65	5.75	5.90	6.02	Result	Notes
1st place, gold medalist(s)	EJ Obiena (PHI)	–	–	–	–	–	O	–	XO	O	XXX	5.90	GR
2nd place, silver medalist(s)	Huang Bokai (CHN)	–	–	–	–	XO	O	O	XXX			5.65	
3rd place, bronze medalist(s)	Hussain Al-Hizam (KSA)	–	–	–	XO	O	X–	O	XXX			5.65	
4	Patsapong Amsam-ang (THA)	–	–	–	O	O	O	XXX				5.55	
4	Yao Jie (CHN)	–	–	–	–	O	O	XX–	X			5.55	
6	Seif Heneida (QAT)	–	–	O	O	XO	XXX					5.45	
7	Kasinpob Chomchanad (THA)	–	O	O	O	XXX						5.30	
8	Han Du-hyeon (KOR)	–	O	O	XXX							5.15	
8	Huang Cheng-chi (TPE)	O	O	O	XXX							5.15	
10	Ivan Tovchenik (KAZ)	–	XO	O	XXX							5.15	
—	Jaffar Ashraf (PAK)	XXX										NM	
—	Seito Yamamoto (JPN)	XXX										NM	
