= Sergey Grigoryev (pole vaulter) =

Kazakhstani pole vaulter (born 1992)

Personal information
- Born: 24 June 1992 (age 34)
- Education: Al-Farabi Kazakh National University

Sport
- Sport: Athletics
- Event: Pole vault

Sergey Grigoryev (Kazakh: Сергей Григорьев; born 24 June 1992) is a Kazakhstani athlete specialising in the pole vault. He won the silver medal at the 2017 Summer Universiade.

His personal bests in the event are 5.65 metres outdoors (Busan 2017) and 5.50 metres indoors (Kamenogorsk 2016)

== International competitions ==
Year	Competition	Venue	Position	Notes
Representing Kazakhstan
2009	World Youth Championships	Brixen, Italy	6th	5.00 m
2010	Asian Junior Championships	Hanoi, Vietnam	2nd	4.95 m
2014	Asian Games	Incheon, South Korea	–	NM
2015	Asian Championships	Wuhan, China	6th	5.40 m
2015	Universiade	Gwangju, South Korea	9th	5.15 m
2017	Universiade	Taipei, Taiwan	2nd	5.50 m
2017	Asian Indoor and Martial Arts Games	Ashgabat, Turkmenistan	1st	5.40 m
2018	Asian Games	Jakarta, Indonesia	4th	5.40 m
2019	Asian Championships	Doha, Qatar	8th	5.51 m
