= 2025 Asian Athletics Championships – Men's pole vault =

Men's pole vault at the 2025 Asian Athletics Championships
- Venue: Gumi Civic Stadium
- Location: Gumi, South Korea
- Dates: 31 May
- Competitors: 15 from 11 nations
- Winning height: 5.77 m

Medalists
gold medal	EJ Obiena	Philippines
silver medal	Huang Bokai	China
bronze medal	Patsapong Amsamarng	Thailand

The men's pole vault event at the 2025 Asian Athletics Championships was held on 31 May. EJ Obiena of the Philippines won his third straight Asian pole vault title.

== Records ==
Records before the 2025 Asian Athletics Championships
Record	Athlete (nation)	Height (m)	Location	Date
World record	Armand Duplantis (SWE)	6.22	Clermont-Ferrand, France	25 February 2023
Asian record	EJ Obiena (PHI)	6.00	Bergen, Norway	10 June 2023
Championship record	EJ Obiena (PHI)	5.91	Bangkok, Thailand	16 July 2023
World leading	Armand Duplantis (SWE)	6.27	Clermont-Ferrand, France	28 February 2025
Asian leading	Li Chenyang (CHN)	5.85	Caen, France	1 February 2025

== Schedule ==
The event schedule, in local time (UTC+9), was as follows:

Date	Time	Round
31 May	17:15	Final

== Results ==
Place	Athlete	Nation	4.82	4.97	5.12	5.22	5.32	5.42	5.52	5.62	5.67	5.72	5.77	5.82	Results	Notes
1st place, gold medalist(s)	EJ Obiena	Philippines	-	-	-	-	-	-	o	-	-	o	-	xxx	5.77 m	(Note: Obiena won a jump off by clearing 5.77 m)
2nd place, silver medalist(s)	Huang Bokai	China	-	-	-	-	o	-	o	o	o	o	-	xxx	5.72 m	SB
3rd place, bronze medalist(s)	Patsapong Amsam-ang	Thailand	-	-	-	o	-	o	xxo	xo	xo	xx-	x		5.67 m	PB
4	Seif Heneida	Qatar	-	-	-	o	-	o	o	xo	xxx				5.62 m	PB
5	Li Chenyang	China	-	-	-	-	o	-	o	xx-	x				5.52 m	
6	Hussain Al-Hizam	Saudi Arabia	-	-	-	o	-	o	x-	xx					5.42 m	SB
7	Seito Yamamoto	Japan	-	-	-	xxo	xxo	o	xx-	x					5.42 m	
8	Ameer Saihood	Iraq	-	o	o	xo	xxo	xxx							5.32 m	
8	Tomoya Karasawa	Japan	-	-	-	xo	xxo	xxx							5.32 m	
10	Jin Min-sub	South Korea	-	o	-	o	xxx								5.22 m	SB
10	Idan Fauzan Richsan	Indonesia	-	-	o	o	xxx								5.22 m	SB
12	Han Du-hyeon	South Korea	-	xxo	-	xo	-								5.22 m	SB
13	Hocket de los Santos	Philippines	xxo	o	xxx										4.97 m	
14	Muhammad Naufal Bin Shahrul	Malaysia	xo	xo	xxx										4.97 m	
—	Low Jun Yu	Singapore	xxx												NM	
