= Chris Nilsen =

American athlete (born 1998)

- Nilsen at the 2026 Athletissima, Diamond League

Personal information
- Full name: Christopher Nilsen
- Nationality: American
- Born: January 13, 1998 (age 28) Kansas City, Missouri, U.S.
- Height: 6 ft 5 in (196 cm)

Sport
- Country: United States
- Sport: Track and field
- Events: High jump Pole vault
- College team: University of South Dakota; Park Hill High School '16
- Club: Nike

Achievements and titles
Personal bests
| Pole vault | 6.00 m (19 ft 8 in) (2022) |
| Pole vault i | 6.05 m (19 ft 10 in) (2022) AR |
Medal record
Men's athletics
Representing the United States
Olympic Games
| Silver medal – second place | 2020 Tokyo | Pole vault |
World Championships
| Silver medal – second place | 2022 Eugene | Pole vault |
| Bronze medal – third place | 2023 Budapest | Pole vault |
World Indoor Championships
| Bronze medal – third place | 2022 Belgrade | Pole vault |
Pan American Games
| Gold medal – first place | 2019 Lima | Pole vault |

Christopher Nilsen (born January 13, 1998) is an American athlete specialising in pole vault and high jump. He won the silver medal at the 2020 Summer Olympics in the pole vault event with a jump of 5.97 m (19 ft 7 in).

== High school ==
Nilsen graduated from Park Hill High School in Kansas City, Missouri. Nilsen was raised in hometown of Kansas City, Missouri. Nilsen set the United States high school record in the pole vault at the Missouri Class 5 sectional meet with a clearance of 5.61 m (18 ft 5 in).

Nilsen won 2016 Kansas Relays pole vault.

== NCAA ==
Nilsen attended the University of South Dakota.

Nilsen is a six-time NCAA Division I First Team All-American, and a three-time NCAA Track and field Pole vault champion. Nilsen holds South Dakota Coyotes school records in the Pole vault indoor 5.80 m (19 ft 0 in) and outdoor 5.86 m (19 ft 3 in).

Nilsen set American & NACAC outdoor pole vault U-20 record 5.75 m (18 ft 10 in) and American & NACAC indoor pole vault U-20 record 5.70 m (18 ft 8 in).

Nilsen honored as 2017 Summit League Indoor Field Athlete of the Year and 2017 Summit League Outdoor Field Athlete of the Year. Nilsen honored on The Bowerman Watch List throughout the 2017 outdoor season.

Nilsen won 2018 Texas Relays clearing 5.80 m (19 ft 0 in), later battled Sam Kendricks at 2018 Drake Relays where he cleared 5.78 m (19 ft 0 in) and described the competition in Des Moines, Iowa to Sioux City Journal.

Nilsen placed second at 2019 NCAA Division I Indoor Track and Field Championships and won the pole vault title in an NCAA Men's Division I Outdoor Track and Field Championships meet record at 2019 NCAA Division I Outdoor Track and Field Championships.

Nilsen won Summit League student-athlete of the week honors for the 9th time in 2019. South Dakota’s Chris Nilsen captured the men’s most outstanding performer of the championship accolade after capturing his third consecutive league pole vault title with a meet record vault of 5.81 m (19 ft 1 in).

Nilsen jumped a then indoor personal best of 5.93 m (19 ft 5 in) at the Devaney Sports Complex in February 2020. This jump represented an Indoor NCAA Collegiate record, previously held by LSU Freshman Mondo Duplantis, which stood until in February 2021 KC Lightfoot cleared 6.00 m (19 ft 8 in).

Representing South Dakota Coyotes
| School Year | Summit League Indoor track and field Championships | NCAA Division I Indoor track and field Championships | Summit League Outdoor Track and Field Championships | NCAA Division I Outdoor Track and Field Championships |
|---|---|---|---|---|
| 2017 Freshman | Pole Vault 1st, 5.63 m (18 ft 6 in) | Pole Vault 1st, 5.70 m (18 ft 8 in) | Pole Vault 1st, 5.51 m (18 ft 1 in) | Pole Vault 3rd, 5.45 m (17 ft 11 in) |
| 2018 Sophomore | Pole Vault 2nd, 5.20 m (17 ft 1 in) | Pole Vault 2nd, 5.60 m (18 ft 4 in) | Pole Vault 1st, 5.80 m (19 ft 0 in) | Pole Vault 1st, 5.83 m (19 ft 2 in) CR |
| 2018 Sophomore | High Jump 6th, 2.00 m (6 ft 7 in) | | High Jump 10th, 1.96 m (6 ft 5 in) | |
| 2019 Junior | Pole Vault 1st, 5.75 m (18 ft 10 in) | Pole Vault 2nd, 5.73 m (18 ft 10 in) | Pole Vault 1st, 5.81 m (19 ft 1 in) | Pole Vault 1st, 5.95 m (19 ft 6 in) MR |
| 2020 Senior | Pole Vault 1st, 5.51 m (18 ft 1 in) | | | |
| 2020 Senior | High Jump 6th, 2.00 m (6 ft 7 in) | | | |

== International ==
Nilsen began competing for South Dakota Coyotes and in Vermillion, South Dakota under coach Derek Miles in Fall 2016.

In London at 2017 World Championships in Athletics, Nilsen cleared 5.60 m (18 ft 4 in) in the Pole Vault to place 13th.

Nilsen won gold in the pole vault at the 2019 Pan Am Games in Lima, Peru after clearing 5.76 m (18 ft 11 in).

Nilsen began his professional career as a Nike sponsored athlete in July, 2020.

On June 21, 2021, Nilsen was the only pole vaulter to clear 5.90 m (19 ft 4 in) at the 2020 Olympic Trials, cementing his first place win and getting him a spot on the Olympic team, alongside Sam Kendricks and KC Lightfoot. He won the silver medal at the Olympic games in Tokyo with a jump of 5.97 m (19 ft 7 in), improving his personal best by two centimeters. Nilsen was full of praise for the winner, Armand Duplantis. He compared the competition against Duplantis that evening as being a regular footballer "trying to emulate Lionel Messi or Cristiano Ronaldo" and that his superiority over the world's best pole vaulters was "impressive and ridiculous".

Nilsen jumped an indoor North American Record of 6.02 m (19 ft 9 in) on 5 February 2022 at Golden Pole Vault Special Meeting in Tourcoing, France.

| Year | US National Championship | Event | Venue | Place | Result |
|---|---|---|---|---|---|
| 2021 | USA Olympic Trials Track and Field Championships | Pole vault | Hayward Field Eugene, Oregon | 1st | 5.90 m (19 ft 4 in) |
| 2018 | 2018 USA Outdoor Track and Field Championships | Pole vault | Drake Stadium (Drake University) | 2nd | 5.80 m (19 ft 0 in) |
| 2017 | 2017 USA Outdoor Track and Field Championships | Pole vault | Hornet Stadium (Sacramento) | 3rd | 5.75 m (18 ft 10 in) |
| 2016 | USA Olympic Trials Track and Field Championships | Pole vault | Hayward Field; Eugene, Oregon | NM | NH @ 5.40 m (17 ft 9 in) |
