= Jin Min-sub =

South Korean pole vaulter (born 1992)

Personal information
- Born: 2 September 1992 (age 33) Busan, South Korea

Sport
- Sport: Athletics
- Event: Pole vault

Jin Min-sub (Korean: 진민섭; born 2 September 1992) is a South Korean athlete specialising in the pole vault. His first major medal was the gold at the 2009 World Youth Championships. He later competed at the 2013 World Championships without qualifying for the final and won the bronze at the 2014 Asian Games.

His personal bests in the event are 5.8 metres outdoors (Sydney 2020) and 5.46 metres indoors (Tsaotun 2014).

== Competition record ==
Year	Competition	Venue	Position	Notes
Representing South Korea
2009	World Youth Championships	Brixen, Italy	1st	5.15 m
2009	Asian Indoor Games	Hanoi, Vietnam	8th	4.80 m
2009	East Asian Games	Hong Kong, China	4th	4.80 m
2010	World Junior Championships	Moncton, Canada	16th (q)	4.95 m
2011	Asian Championships	Kobe, Japan	6th	5.20 m
2011	Universiade	Shenzhen, China	7th	5.35 m
2012	Asian Indoor Championships	Hangzhou, China	–	NM
2013	Asian Championships	Pune, India	3rd	5.20 m
2013	World Championships	Moscow, Russia	29th (q)	5.25 m
2014	Asian Games	Incheon, South Korea	3rd	5.45 m
2015	Asian Championships	Wuhan, China	9th	5.20 m
2015	Universiade	Gwangju, South Korea	5th	5.30 m
2015	Military World Games	Mungyeong, South Korea	1st	5.40 m
2018	Asian Games	Jakarta, Indonesia	5th	5.40 m
2019	Asian Championships	Doha, Qatar	4th	5.61 m
2019	World Championships	Doha, Qatar	25th (q)	5.45 m
2021	Olympic Games	Tokyo, Japan	19th (q)	5.50 m
2025	Asian Championships	Gumi, South Korea	10th	5.22 m
