= 2015 Asian Athletics Championships – Men's pole vault =

The men's pole vault event at the 2015 Asian Athletics Championships was held on June 4.

== Results ==
Rank	Name	Nationality	5.00	5.20	5.30	5.40	5.50	5.60	5.65	Result	Notes
1st place, gold medalist(s)	Zhang Wei	China	–	o	–	o	o	o	xxx	5.60	
2nd place, silver medalist(s)	Seito Yamamoto	Japan	–	–	o	–	xo	xxx		5.50	
3rd place, bronze medalist(s)	Huang Bokai	China	–	o	–	xo	xo	x–	xx	5.50	
4	Hiroki Ogita	Japan	–	–	o	–	xxo	xxx		5.50	
5	Yao Jie	China	–	–	xxo	–	xxo	–	xxx	5.50	
6	Sergey Grigoryev	Kazakhstan	o	o	–	o	xx–	x		5.40	
6	Han Du-hyeon	South Korea	o	o	o	o	xxx			5.40	
8	Nikita Filippov	Kazakhstan	–	o	–	xxo	–	xxx		5.40	
9	Jin Min-sub	South Korea	–	o	–	xxx				5.20	
10	Hsieh Chia-Han	Chinese Taipei	o	xxx						5.00	
	Ali Al-Sabaghah	Kuwait								DNS	
	Fahad Al-Mershad	Kuwait								DNS	
