= Yao Jie (pole vaulter) =

Chinese pole vaulter (born 1990)

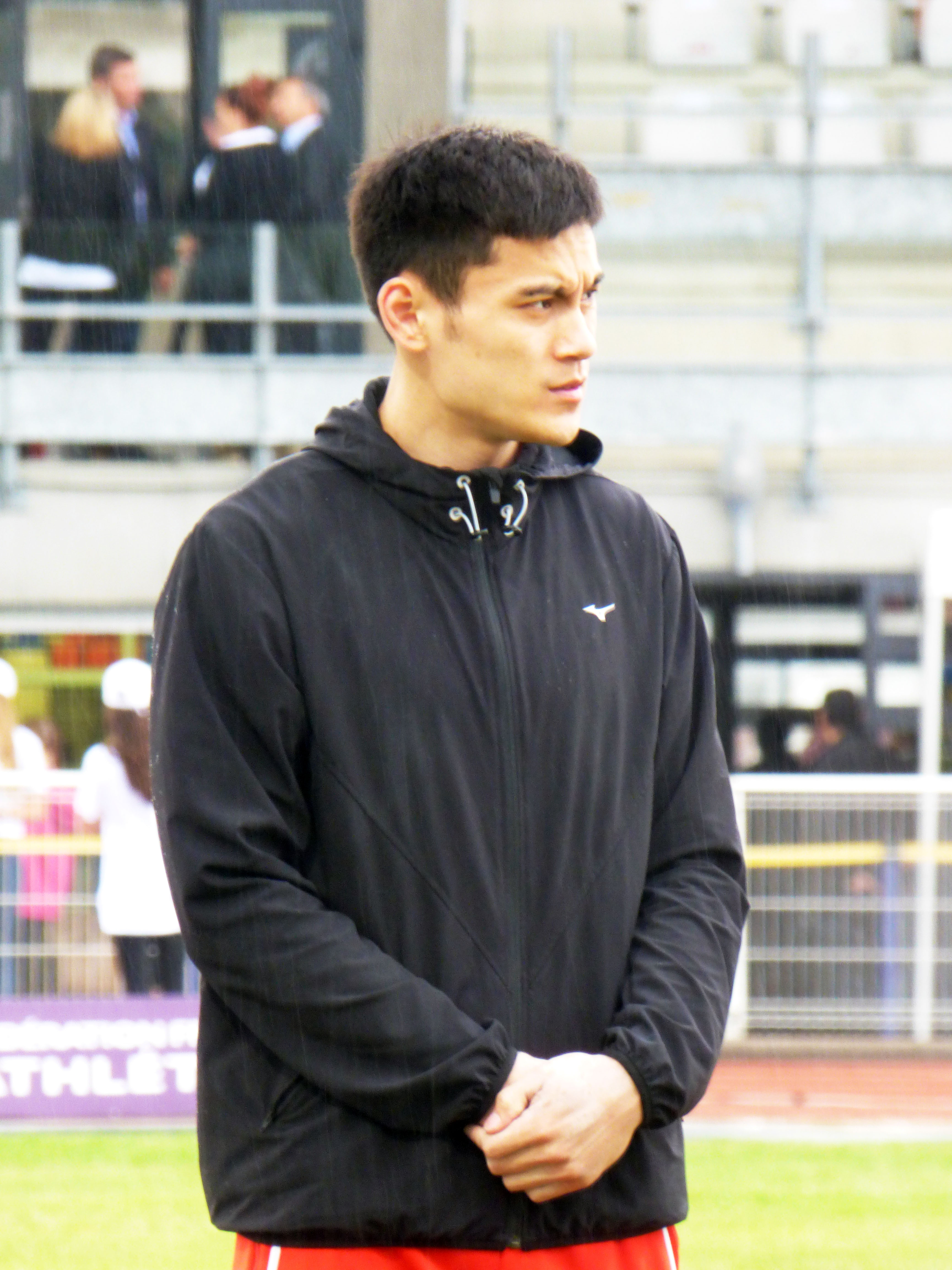

Personal information
- Born: 21 September 1990 (age 36)
- Height: 1.88 m (6 ft 2 in)
- Weight: 85 kg (187 lb)

Sport
- Country: China
- Sport: Track and field
- Event: Pole vault
Medal record
Men's athletics
Representing China
Asian Games
Silver medal – second place	2026 Aichi–Nagoya	Pole vault
- Updated on 29 September 2026

Yao Jie (Chinese: 姚捷; born 21 September 1990) is a male Chinese athlete specialising in the pole vault. He competed at the 2015 World Championships in Beijing without qualifying for the final. He also competed at the 2016 Olympics. He cleared the minimum height the other finalists cleared, 5.60m, but his one miss relegated him to a non-qualifying 14th place.

His personal bests in the event are 5.82 metres outdoors (Hangzhou 2023) and 5.75 metres indoors (Roubaix 2019).

== Competition record ==
Year	Competition	Venue	Position	Notes
Representing China
2011	Universiade	Shenzhen, China	16th (q)	5.10 m
2015	Asian Championships	Wuhan, China	5th	5.50 m
2015	World Championships	Beijing, China	22nd (q)	5.65 m
2016	Olympic Games	Rio de Janeiro, Brazil	14th (q)	5.60 m
2017	World Championships	London, United Kingdom	11th (q)	5.60 m^{1}
2018	Asian Games	Jakarta, Indonesia	2nd	5.50 m
2019	World Championships	Doha, Qatar	–	NM
2023	Asian Championships	Bangkok, Thailand	–	NM
2023	World Championships	Budapest, Hungary	9th	5.75 m
2023	Asian Games	Hangzhou, China	4th	5.55 m
2024	Olympic Games	Paris, France	20th (q)	5.60 m

^{1}No mark in the final
