= Patsapong Amsam-ang =

Thai pole vaulter (born 1997)

Personal information
- Born: 2 October 1997 (age 28) Ratchaburi, Thailand
- Height: 1.69 m (5 ft 7 in)
- Weight: 64 kg (141 lb)

Sport
- Sport: Athletics
- Event: Pole vault
Medal record
Men's athletics
Representing Thailand
Summer World University Games
Silver medal – second place	2023 Chengdu	Pole vault
Asian Championships
Bronze medal – third place	2025 Gumi	Pole vault
Asian Indoor Championships
Bronze medal – third place	2023 Astana	Pole vault
Asian Games
Bronze medal – third place	2018 Jakarta-Palembang	Pole vault
SEA Games
Silver medal – second place	2017 Kuala Lumpur	Pole vault
Silver medal – second place	2025 Thailand	Pole vault
Bronze medal – third place	2023 Phnom Penh	Pole vault

Patsapong Amsam-ang (Thai: ภาสพงศ์ อ่ำสำอาง; born 2 October 1997) is a Thai athlete specialising in the pole vault. He won a bronze medal at the 2018 Asian Games.

His personal bests in the event are 5.70 metres outdoors (Bangkok 2025) and 5.35 metres indoors (Astana 2023). Both are currents national records.

== Early life and education ==
Patsapong Amsam-ang was born on 2 October 1997 in Ratchaburi, Thailand. He studied at the Damnoen Witthaya School in elementary initially taking up football. When he attended Wat Huai Chorakhe Witthayakhom School in the secondary level he switched to track and field.

== International competitions ==
Year	Competition	Venue	Position	Notes
Representing Thailand
2016	Asian Junior Championships	Ho Chi Minh City, Vietnam	2nd	5.20 m
2016	World U20 Championships	Bydgoszcz, Poland	19th (q)	4.95 m
2017	Asian Championships	Bhubaneswar, India	4th	5.40 m
2017	Southeast Asian Games	Kuala Lumpur, Malaysia	2nd	5.30 m
2017	Asian Indoor and Martial Arts Games	Ashgabat, Turkmenistan	3rd	5.20 m
2018	Asian Games	Jakarta, Indonesia	3rd	5.50 m
2019	Asian Championships	Doha, Qatar	5th	5.51 m
2019	Universiade	Naples, Italy	6th	5.31 m
2023	Asian Indoor Championships	Astana, Kazakhstan	3rd	5.35 m
2023	Southeast Asian Games	Phnom Penh, Cambodia	3rd	5.20 m
2023	Asian Championships	Bangkok, Thailand	6th	5.31 m
2023	World University Games	Chengdu, China	2nd	5.55 m
2023	Asian Games	Hangzhou, China	4th	5.55 m
2024	Asian Indoor Championships	Tehran, Iran	5th	5.45 m
2025	Asian Championships	Gumi, South Korea	3rd	5.67 m
2025	SEA Games	Bangkok, Thailand	2nd	5.70 m
2026	Asian Indoor Championships	Tianjin, China	4th	5.20 m
