= Nikita Filippov (pole vaulter) =

Kazakhstani pole vaulter (born 1991)

Medal record

Men's athletics

Representing Kazakhstan

Asian Indoor Championships
Gold medal – first place	2018 Tehran	Pole vault

Nikita Filippov (born 7 October 1991 in Almaty) is a Kazakhstani pole vaulter. He competed in the pole vault event at the 2012 Summer Olympics.

He has an outdoor personal best of 5.65 metres (2015) and an indoor personal best of 5.50 metres (2011).

== Competition record ==
Year	Competition	Venue	Position	Notes
Representing Kazakhstan
2008	Asian Junior Championships	Jakarta, Indonesia	3rd	4.80 m
2010	Asian Indoor Championships	Tehran, Iran	2nd	5.10 m
2010	Asian Junior Championships	Hanoi, Vietnam	1st	5.05 m
2010	World Junior Championships	Moncton, Canada	11th	4.85 m
2011	Asian Championships	Kobe, Japan	4th	5.40 m
2012	Olympic Games	London, United Kingdom	18th (q)	5.35 m
2013	Universiade	Kazan, Russia	3rd	5.50 m
2013	World Championships	Moscow, Russia	14th (q)	5.40 m
2014	Asian Games	Incheon, South Korea	5th	5.25 m
2015	Asian Championships	Wuhan, China	8th	5.40 m
2015	Universiade	Gwangju, South Korea	1st	5.50 m
2015	World Championships	Beijing, China	30th (q)	5.40 m
2017	Universiade	Taipei, Taiwan	5th	5.30 m
2018	Asian Indoor Championships	Tehran, Iran	1st	5.20 m
2018	Asian Games	Jakarta, Indonesia	8th	5.30 m
