= Athletics at the 2013 Summer Universiade – Men's pole vault =

The men's pole vault event at the 2013 Summer Universiade was held on 11 July.

== Results ==
Rank	Athlete	Nationality	5.00	5.15	5.30	5.40	5.50	5.60	5.70	Result	Notes
1st place, gold medalist(s)	Sam Kendricks	United States	o	o	o	o	o	o	xxx	5.60	
2nd place, silver medalist(s)	Seito Yamamoto	Japan	–	–	o	–	o	xxo	xxx	5.60	
3rd place, bronze medalist(s)	Nikita Filippov	Kazakhstan	–	–	xo	–	xxo	xxx		5.50	
4	Hendrik Gruber	Germany	–	xo	–	xo	xxo	xxx		5.50	
5	Aleksandr Gripich	Russia	–	o	o	o	xxx			5.40	
6	Han Duh-yeon	South Korea	–	xo	xo	o	xxx			5.40	PB
7	Artem Burya	Russia	–	–	o	xo	xxx			5.40	
8	Mareks Ārents	Latvia	o	o	o	xxx				5.30	
9	Michael Woepse	United States	xo	xxo	o	xxx				5.30	
10	Paul Kilbertus	Austria	xo	o	xxx					5.15	SB
11	Shawnacy Barber	Canada	–	xo	xxx					5.15	
