= Huang Bokai =

Chinese pole vaulter (born 1996)

Personal information
- Nationality: Chinese
- Born: 26 September 1996 (age 29)
- Height: 1.90 m (6 ft 3 in)
- Weight: 78 kg (172 lb)

Sport
- Sport: Athletics
- Event: Pole vault
- Coached by: Vitaliy Petrov
Medal record
Men's athletics
Representing China
Asian Games
Silver medal – second place	2022 Hangzhou	Pole vault
Asian Championships
Silver medal – second place	2025 Gumi	Pole vault
Bronze medal – third place	2023 Bangkok	Pole vault
Bronze medal – third place	2019 Doha	Pole vault
Bronze medal – third place	2015 Wuhan	Pole vault
Asian Indoor Championships
Gold medal – first place	2016 Doha	Pole vault

Huang Bokai (Chinese: 黄博凯; born 26 September 1996) is a Chinese athlete specialising in the pole vault. He represented his country at the 2016 Summer Olympics without qualifying for the final.

His personal bests in the event are 5.80 metres outdoors (Paris 2024) and 5.75 metres indoors (Doha 2016).

== International competitions ==
Year	Competition	Venue	Position	Notes
Representing China
2013	World Youth Championships	Donetsk, Ukraine	2nd	5.20 m
2014	Asian Junior Championships	Taipei, Taiwan	1st	5.25 m
2014	World Junior Championships	Eugene, United States	5th	5.45 m
2015	Asian Championships	Wuhan, China	3rd	5.50 m
2016	Asian Indoor Championships	Doha, Qatar	1st	5.75 m
2016	Olympic Games	Rio de Janeiro, Brazil	16th (q)	5.45 m
2019	Asian Championships	Doha, Qatar	3rd	5.66 m
2019	World Championships	Doha, Qatar	9th	5.55 m
2021	Olympic Games	Tokyo, Japan	21st (q)	5.50 m
2022	World Championships	Eugene, United States	24th (q)	5.50 m
2023	Asian Championships	Bangkok, Thailand	3rd	5.51 m
2023	World Championships	Budapest, Hungary	6th	5.75 m
2023	Asian Games	Hangzhou, China	2nd	5.65 m
2024	Olympic Games	Paris, France	7th	5.80 m
2025	Asian Championships	Gumi, South Korea	2nd	5.72 m
2025	World Championships	Tokyo, Japan	–	NM
