= Athletics at the 2018 Commonwealth Games – Men's pole vault =

Men's pole vault at the 2018 Commonwealth Games
- Venue: Carrara Stadium
- Dates: 12 April 2018
- Competitors: 9 from 6 nations
- Winning height: 5.70 m

Medalists
gold medal	Kurtis Marschall	Australia
silver medal	Shawnacy Barber	Canada
bronze medal	Luke Cutts	England

The men's pole vault at the 2018 Commonwealth Games, as part of the athletics programme, took place in the Carrara Stadium on 12 April 2018.

== Records ==
Prior to this competition, the existing world and Games records were as follows:

World record	Renaud Lavillenie (FRA)	6.16 m (indoor mark)	Donetsk, Ukraine	15 February 2014
Games record	Steven Hooker (AUS)	5.80 m	Melbourne, Australia	24 March 2006

== Schedule ==
The schedule was as follows:

Date	Time	Round
Thursday 12 April 2018	19:25	Final

All times are Australian Eastern Standard Time (UTC+10)

== Results ==
With nine entrants, the event was held as a straight final.

Rank	Athlete	4.80	5.00	5.20	5.35	5.45	5.55	5.60	5.65	5.70	5.81	Result	Notes
1st place, gold medalist(s)	Kurtis Marschall (AUS)	–	–	–	–	xo	xo	–	o	xxo	xxx	5.70	
2nd place, silver medalist(s)	Shawnacy Barber (CAN)	–	–	–	o	–	xxo	–	o	xxx		5.65	
3rd place, bronze medalist(s)	Luke Cutts (ENG)	–	–	xo	o	o	xxx					5.45	R 144.3
4	Adam Hague (ENG)	–	–	o	o	xo	xxx					5.45	SB
5	Angus Armstrong (AUS)	–	o	xo	o	xxx						5.35	
6	Deryk Theodore (CAN)	–	o	xxo	o	xxx						5.35	
7	Nikandros Stylianou (CYP)	–	o	o	xo	xxx						5.35	
8	Iskandar Alwi (MAS)	o	xo	xxx								5.00	
–	Nicholas Southgate (NZL)	–	–	xxx								NM	
