= Athletics at the 2021 Summer World University Games – Men's pole vault =

The men's pole vault event at the 2021 Summer World University Games was held on 5 August 2023 at the Shuangliu Sports Centre Stadium in Chengdu, China.

== Medalists ==
Gold	Silver	Bronze
Urho Kujanpää; Finland	Patsapong Amsam-ang; Thailand	Koen van der Wijst; Netherlands

== Results ==
Rank	Name	Nationality	4.65	4.80	4.95	5.10	5.25	5.35	5.45	5.55	5.60	Result	Notes
1st place, gold medalist(s)	Urho Kujanpää	Finland	–	–	–	o	–	xo	o	xo	xxx	5.55	
2nd place, silver medalist(s)	Patsapong Amsam-ang	Thailand	–	–	–	–	o	o	o	xxo	xxx	5.55	
3rd place, bronze medalist(s)	Koen van der Wijst	Netherlands	–	–	–	o	o	o	xo	xxx		5.45	
4	Tomoya Karasawa	Japan	–	–	–	o	xo	o	xxx			5.35	
5	Romain Gavillon	France	–	–	–	xo	xo	o	xxx			5.35	
6	Ivan Paravac	Croatia	–	–	–	o	–	xo	xxx			5.35	
7	Riccardo Klotz	Austria	–	–	–	xo	–	xxo	x–	xx		5.35	SB
8	Louis Pröbstle	Germany	–	–	–	xo	xo	xxo	xxx			5.35	
9	Lin Tsung-hsien	Chinese Taipei	–	–	o	o	xo	xxx				5.25	PB
10	Luke Zenker	Germany	–	–	o	o	xxx					5.10	
11	Hendrik van Wyk	South Africa	–	–	–	xo	xxx					5.10	
–	Wei Yanhe	China	xxx									NM	
–	Kazuki Furusawa	Japan	–	–	–	xxx						NM	
–	Christos Tamanis	Cyprus	–	–	xxx							NM	
