= 2017 Asian Athletics Championships – Men's pole vault =

The men's pole vault at the 2017 Asian Athletics Championships was held on 6 July.

== Results ==
| Rank | Name | Nationality | 4.85 | 5.00 | 5.10 | 5.20 | 5.30 | 5.40 | 5.50 | 5.60 | 5.65 | 5.70 | Result | Notes |
|---|---|---|---|---|---|---|---|---|---|---|---|---|---|---|
| 1st place, gold medalist(s) | Ding Bangchao | China | – | – | – | o | – | o | xo | o | xxo | xxx | 5.65 | |
| 2nd place, silver medalist(s) | Masaki Ejima | Japan | – | – | – | o | – | xo | o | xo | xxo | xxx | 5.65 | AJR |
| 3rd place, bronze medalist(s) | Ernest John Obiena | Philippines | – | xo | – | o | – | o | xxo | xx– | x | | 5.50 | |
| 4 | Patsapong Amsam-Ang | Thailand | o | o | o | o | o | o | xxx | | | | 5.40 | |
| 5 | Han Du-hyeon | South Korea | – | – | – | xo | – | o | xxx | | | | 5.40 | |
| 6 | Danil Polyanskiy | Kazakhstan | – | o | o | xo | xxx | | | | | | 5.20 | |
| 7 | Hussain Al-Hizam | Saudi Arabia | – | – | – | xxo | x– | xx | | | | | 5.20 | |
| 8 | Xia Xiang | China | – | xo | – | xxx | | | | | | | 5.00 | |
| 9 | Yotsakon Khumniem | Thailand | xo | xxo | xxx | | | | | | | | 5.00 | |
| | Siva Subramaniam | India | – | xxx | | | | | | | | | NM | |

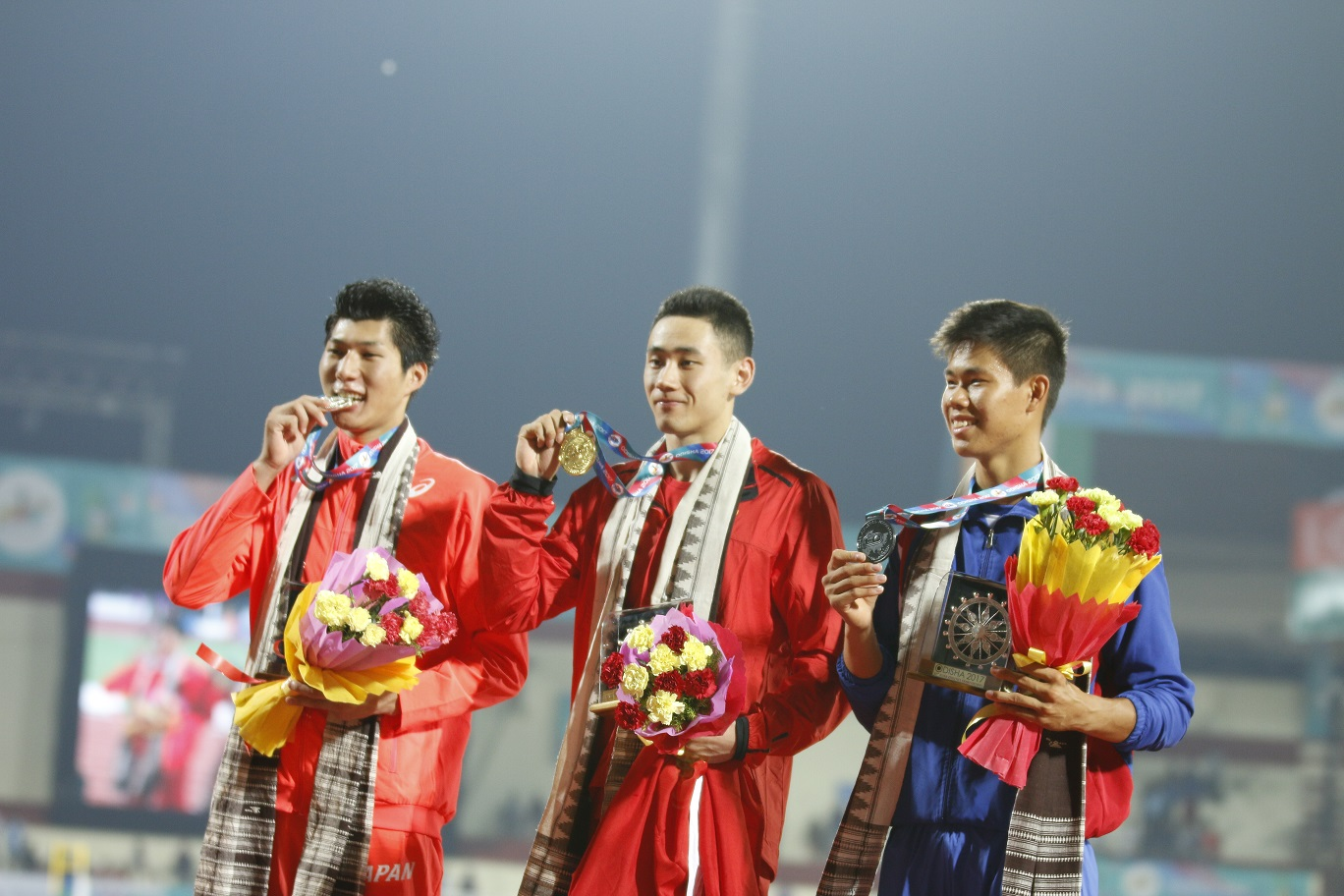
The medal winners
