= Athletics at the 2016 Summer Olympics – Men's pole vault =

Men's pole vault at the Games of the XXXI Olympiad
- Venue: Olympic Stadium
- Dates: 13–15 August 2016
- Competitors: 31 from 16 nations
- Winning height: 6.03 OR, AR

Medalists
1st place, gold medalist(s)		Thiago Braz	Brazil
2nd place, silver medalist(s)		Renaud Lavillenie	France
3rd place, bronze medalist(s)		Sam Kendricks	United States

Official Video Highlights

The men's pole vault competition at the 2016 Summer Olympics in Rio de Janeiro, Brazil. The event was held at the Olympic Stadium between 13–15 August. Thirty-one athletes from 16 nations competed. Thiago Braz of Brazil won the gold medal, the nation's first medal in the men's pole vault. Renaud Lavillenie of France was unable to successfully defend his 2012 gold, but became the seventh man to win two medals with silver this time. Sam Kendricks's bronze returned the United States to the podium after a one-Games absence.

== Summary ==
=== Background ===
This was the 28th appearance of the event, which is one of 12 athletics events to have been held at every Summer Olympics.

The world record holder (having broken Sergey Bubka's 20-year-old record in 2014), Renaud Lavillenie of France, entered as the reigning Olympic champion from 2012 and held the best vaults indoors and out before the competition. The 2015 World Champion Shawnacy Barber of Canada ranked just behind, having had his first six-metre clearance that season. One of Brazil's best athletics medal hopes was Thiago Braz, the 2012 World Junior Champion (ahead of Barber), who had the third best mark of the year. The American champion Sam Kendricks was also highly ranked and had won silver at the 2016 World Indoor Championships behind Lavillenie. In addition to Lavillenie, the returning finalists from 2008 were bronze medalist Raphael Holzdeppe of Germany, sixth-place finisher Konstadinos Filippidis of Greece, and seventh-place finisher Jan Kudlička of the Czech Republic.

No nation made its men's pole vaulting debut, the fifth Games that occurred. The United States made its 27th appearance, most of any nation, having missed only the boycotted 1980 Games.

=== Competition ===
In the qualifying round, nine men reached 5.70 m with three others progressing on 5.60 m. An injury-affected Raphael Holzdeppe, a former world champion and Olympic medallist, exited at this stage, as did 2011 world champion Paweł Wojciechowski. Both Barber and Braz required three attempts at their opening height but managed to progress. Braz, Kendricks and Greece's Konstadínos Filippídis showed form as the only athletes to clear 5.70 m in one attempt.

After one attempt by Xue Changrui, the final round was delayed for one hour and restarted from scratch due to a rainstorm that passed through. Six competitors had already exited the competition before defending champion/world record holder Renaud Lavillenie took his first attempt at 5.75 m. Among the eliminated was 2015 World Champion Shawnacy Barber. There was a great deal of strategic passing in this event, place meaning everything in the Olympics as opposed to most other competitions where the fraternity of pole vaulters are all seeking to improve their personal best. The medalists were settled with a first attempt clearance of 5.85 m. Jan Kudlička and Piotr Lisek missed once and strategically passed to 5.93 m where they missed, while Xie had already strategically passed to 5.85 m and missed. Sam Kendricks was high over his bars earlier in the competition but could go no further than 5.85 m and had to settle for bronze, while Lavillenie held the lead with a clean round of first attempt clearances to 5.98 m (the latter improving his own Olympic record from London). The Brazilian favourite, Thiago Braz, cleared an outdoor personal record of 5.93 m on his second attempt to surpass Kendricks. Jumping ahead of him, after Lavillenie cleared 5.98 m, with nothing to be gained by a clearance, Braz passed. At the next height, 6.03 m (19 ft 9 1/4 in) after Lavillenie had missed twice, on his second attempt, Braz made a solid clearance. Lavillenie passed to the next height, 6.08 m. Even though he holds the world record, that was set in controlled conditions indoors, 6.08 m is a height he has never cleared outdoors. These conditions, with rain and wind affecting competitions all across the Olympic venues, were anything but controlled. Lavillenie missed and the Olympic title was settled.

Braz set a new South American Record, a 10 cm improvement over his own record. The clearance remains tied with Okkert Brits and Jeff Hartwig as the ninth highest jump in history, and currently stands as the Olympic record. At 6.03 m, Braz was the highest jumper for first time entry into the Six metres club.

The following evening the medals were presented by Bernard Rajzman, IOC member, Brazil and Roberto Gesta de Melo, Council Member of the IAAF.

== Qualification ==
A National Olympic Committee (NOC) could enter up to 3 qualified athletes in the men's pole vault event if all athletes met the entry standard during the qualifying period. (The limit of 3 has been in place since the 1930 Olympic Congress.) The qualifying standard was 5.70 metres. The qualifying period was from 1 May 2015 to 11 July 2016. The qualifying distance standards could be obtained in various meets during the given period that have the approval of the IAAF. Both indoor and outdoor meets were accepted. NOCs could also use their universality place—each NOC could enter one male athlete regardless of time if they had no male athletes meeting the entry standard for an athletics event—in the pole vault.

== Competition format ==
The competition consisted of two rounds, qualification and final. In qualification, each athlete had three attempts at each height and was eliminated if he failed to clear any height. Athletes who successfully jumped the qualifying height moved on to the final. If fewer than 12 reached that height, the best 12 moved on. Cleared heights reset for the final, which followed the same three-attempts-per-height format until all athletes reached a height they could not jump.

== Records ==
Prior to the competition, the existing world and Olympic records were as follows.

World record	Renaud Lavillenie (FRA)	6.16	Donetsk, Ukraine	15 February 2014
Olympic record	Renaud Lavillenie (FRA)	5.97	London, United Kingdom	10 August 2012

2016 World leading	Renaud Lavillenie (FRA)	5.96	Sotteville-lès-Rouen, France	18 July 2016

Two men were left after 5.93 metres, with the bar raised to a potential Olympic record height of 5.98 metres. Renaud Lavillenie cleared it on his first attempt, breaking the record. Thiago Braz passed at the height, as matching the new record would do him no good in placement in the event. At 6.03 metres, Lavillenie missed, Braz missed, Lavillenie missed again, and then Braz cleared to take the Olympic record from Lavillenie. The Frenchman took his final attempt at 6.08 metres, unsuccessfully; with the gold medal secured, Braz did not jump at the greater height.

The following national record was established during the competition:

Country	Athlete	Round	Height	Notes
Brazil	Thiago Braz (BRA)	Final	6.03	OR, AR

== Schedule ==
All times are Brasilia Time (UTC-3)

Date	Time	Round
Saturday, 13 August 2016	20:20	Qualifying
Monday, 15 August 2016	20:35	Finals

== Results ==
Key

- o = Height cleared
- x = Height failed
- – = Height passed
- r = Retired
- SB = Season's best
- PB = Personal best
- NR = National record
- AR = Area record
- OR = Olympic record
- WR = World record
- WL = World lead
- NM = No mark
- DNS = Did not start
- DQ = Disqualified

=== Qualifying round ===
Qualification rule: Qualifying performance 5.75 (Q) or at least 12 best performers (q) advance to the Final.

Rank	Group	Athlete	Nation	5.30	5.45	5.60	5.70	Height	Notes
1	A	Sam Kendricks	United States	o	o	o	o	5.70	q
2	B	Konstadinos Filippidis	Greece	o	o	xo	o	5.70	q
3	B	Thiago Braz	Brazil	–	xx–	o	o	5.70	q
4	A	Renaud Lavillenie	France	–	–	–	xo	5.70	q
4	A	Xue Changrui	China	–	o	o	xo	5.70	q
6	A	Piotr Lisek	Poland	–	o	xo	xo	5.70	q
7	B	Shawnacy Barber	Canada	–	xxo	o	xo	5.70	q
7	A	Germán Chiaraviglio	Argentina	o	o	xxo	xo	5.70	q, SB
7	A	Jan Kudlička	Czech Republic	o	o	xxo	xo	5.70	q
10	B	Michal Balner	Czech Republic	o	o	o	xxx	5.60	q
10	A	Pauls Pujāts	Latvia	o	o	o	xxx	5.60	q
10	A	Daichi Sawano	Japan	–	o	o	xxx	5.60	q
13	A	Robert Sobera	Poland	o	x	o	xxx	5.60	
14	B	Yao Jie	China	–	xo	xo	xxx	5.60	
15	A	Kurtis Marschall	Australia	o	o	xxo	xxx	5.60	
16	B	Mareks Ārents	Latvia	o	o	xxx	—	5.45	
16	B	Huang Bokai	China	o	o	xxx	—	5.45	
16	B	Stanley Joseph	France	o	o	xxx	—	5.45	
16	B	Kévin Menaldo	France	–	o	xr	—	5.45	
16	B	Paweł Wojciechowski	Poland	o	o	xxx	—	5.45	
21	A	Hiroki Ogita	Japan	xo	o	xxx	—	5.45	
22	A	Luke Cutts	Great Britain	o	xo	xxx	—	5.45	
22	A	Augusto Dutra de Oliveira	Brazil	o	xo	xxx	—	5.45	
22	B	Robert Renner	Slovenia	o	xo	xxx	—	5.45	
25	A	Tobias Scherbarth	Germany	xo	xo	xxx	—	5.45	
26	A	Raphael Holzdeppe	Germany	–	xxo	xxx	—	5.45	
27	B	Ivan Horvat	Croatia	o	xxx	—		5.30	
28	B	Logan Cunningham	United States	xxo	xxx	—		5.30	
28	B	Karsten Dilla	Germany	xxo	xxx	—		5.30	
28	B	Cale Simmons	United States	xxo	xxx	—		5.30	
—	B	Seito Yamamoto	Japan	–	xxx	—		NM	
—	A	Melker Svärd Jacobsson	Sweden	—				DNS	

=== Final ===
Rank	Athlete	Nation	5.50	5.65	5.75	5.85	5.93	5.98	6.03	6.08	Height	Notes
1st place, gold medalist(s)	Thiago Braz	Brazil	–	o	xo	o	xo	–	xo	—	6.03	OR, AR
2nd place, silver medalist(s)	Renaud Lavillenie	France	–	–	o	o	o	o	xx–	x	5.98	
3rd place, bronze medalist(s)	Sam Kendricks	United States	o	xo	x–	o	xxx	—			5.85	
4	Jan Kudlička	Czech Republic	o	o	o	x–	xx	—			5.75	
4	Piotr Lisek	Poland	o	o	o	x–	xx	—			5.75	
6	Xue Changrui	China	xxo	xxo	xx–	x	—				5.65	
7	Michal Balner	Czech Republic	o	xxx	—						5.50	
7	Konstadinos Filippidis	Greece	o	xxx	—						5.50	
7	Daichi Sawano	Japan	o	xxx	—						5.50	
10	Shawnacy Barber	Canada	xo	xxx	—						5.50	
11	Germán Chiaraviglio	Argentina	xxo	xxx	—						5.50	
—	Pauls Pujāts	Latvia	xxx	—							NM	
