= 2019 World Athletics Championships – Men's pole vault =

Pole vault championship

Men's pole vault at the 2019 World Championships
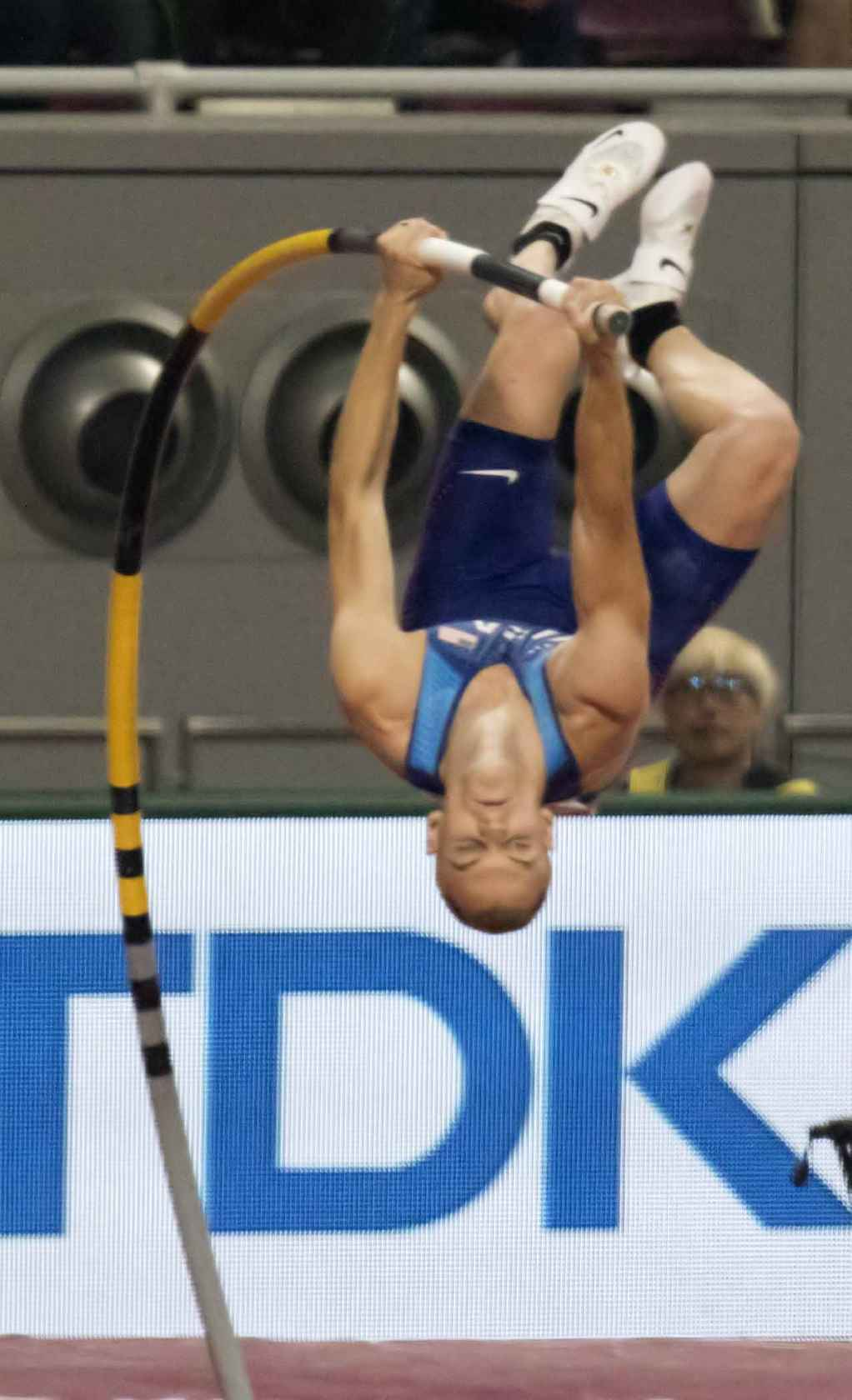
- Sam Kendricks in the final
- Venue: Khalifa International Stadium
- Dates: 28 September (qualification); 1 October (final)
- Competitors: 34 from 16 nations
- Winning height: 5.97

Medalists
gold medal	Sam Kendricks	United States
silver medal	Armand Duplantis	Sweden
bronze medal	Piotr Lisek	Poland

The men's pole vault at the 2019 World Athletics Championships was held at the Khalifa International Stadium in Doha from 28 September to 1 October 2019.

== Summary ==
The field many of the top contemporary pole vaulters, except for 2015 champion Shawnacy Barber. World record holder Renaud Lavillenie and 2011 champion Paweł Wojciechowski failed to qualify for the final. In the final, 2013 champion Raphael Holzdeppe and Olympic champion Thiago Braz bowed out, unable to clear 5.80m. That height selected the medalists and it was the same three who had cleared 6 metres earlier in the season, all three perfect to that point.

At 5.87m, all three athletes failed on their first attempts. Armand Duplantis cleared the height on his second attempt, as did Piotr Lisek. However, defending champion Sam Kendricks missed again, losing his lead and leaving himself with only one more attempt to stay in the competition. He adjusted the placement of his standards and successfully cleared the height, keeping his hopes alive. At 5.92m, Duplantis and Lisek missed their first attempts, Kendricks made his. Advantage Kendricks. Duplantis missed his next attempt, then Lisek decided to go for the win and saved his two remaining attempts for the next height 5.97 m (19 ft 7 in). Now the pressure was on Duplantis. He made his attempt, putting him into silver medal position.

At 5.97m, none of the three could get over on their first two attempts. Lisek was eliminated and had to settle for bronze. Again under pressure, Duplantis and Kendricks both made their final attempt. The bar moved to 6.02m with Kendricks holding the lead. Neither athlete was able to clear the height on their first two attempts. When Duplantis failed on his third attempt, Kendricks celebrated the successful defense of his title.

At the end of the competition, the medallists celebrated together on the pole vault mat. Their act of competitor camaraderie earned them a place on the shortlist for the International Fair Play Award.

== Records ==
Before the competition records were as follows:

World record	Renaud Lavillenie (FRA)	6.16 m	Donetsk, Ukraine	15 February 2014
Championship record	Dmitri Markov (AUS)	6.05 m	Edmonton, Canada	9 August 2001
World Leading	Sam Kendricks (USA)	6.06 m	Des Moines, United States	27 July 2019
African Record	Okkert Brits (RSA)	6.03 m	Cologne, Germany	18 August 1995
Asian Record	Igor Potapovich (KAZ)	5.92 m	Stockholm, Sweden	19 February 1998
North, Central American and Caribbean record	Sam Kendricks (USA)	6.06 m	Des Moines, United States	27 July 2019
South American Record	Thiago Braz (BRA)	6.03 m	Rio de Janeiro, Brazil	15 August 2016
European Record	Renaud Lavillenie (FRA)	6.16 m	Donetsk, Ukraine	15 February 2014
Oceanian record	Steven Hooker (AUS)	6.06 m	Boston, United States	7 February 2009

== Qualification standard ==
The standard to qualify automatically for entry was 5.71 m.

== Schedule ==
The event schedule, in local time (UTC+3), was as follows:

Date	Time	Round
28 September	17:30	Qualification
1 October	20:05	Final

== Results ==
=== Qualification ===
Qualification: 5.75 m (Q) or at least 12 best performers (q).

Rank	Group	Name	Nationality	5.30	5.45	5.60	5.70	5.75	Mark	Notes
1	A	Sam Kendricks	United States	o	o	o	o	o	5.75	Q
1	B	Piotr Lisek	Poland	–	o	o	o	o	5.75	Q
3	B	Cole Walsh	United States	–	xo	xo	xxo	o	5.75	Q
4	A	Thiago Braz	Brazil	–	o	o	o	xo	5.75	Q
5	A	Claudio Stecchi	Italy	–	–	o	xo	xo	5.75	Q
6	A	Huang Bokai	China	–	o	xxo	xo	xo	5.75	Q, PB
7	B	Armand Duplantis	Sweden	–	–	o	o	xxo	5.75	Q
8	B	Raphael Holzdeppe	Germany	–	o	xo	xxo	xxo	5.75	Q
9	A	Valentin Lavillenie	France	–	o	o	o	xxx	5.70	q
10	B	Augusto Dutra	Brazil	–	o	xo	o	xxx	5.70	q
11	A	Ben Broeders	Belgium	–	xo	xo	o	xxx	5.70	q
11	B	Bo Kanda Lita Baehre	Germany	–	o	xxo	o	xxx	5.70	q
13	B	Konstantinos Filippidis	Greece	o	o	o	xxo	xxx	5.70	
13	A	Paweł Wojciechowski	Poland	–	o	o	xxo	xxx	5.70	
15	A	Emmanouil Karalis	Greece	–	o	o	xxx		5.60	
15	B	Renaud Lavillenie	France	–	–	o	xxx		5.60	
15	B	KC Lightfoot	United States	o	o	o	xxx		5.60	
15	B	Ernest Obiena	Philippines	–	o	o	xxx		5.60	
19	B	Robert Sobera	Poland	o	xxo	o	xxx		5.60	
20	B	Seito Yamamoto	Japan	o	xo	xo	xxx		5.60	
21	A	Ding Bangchao	China	xo	xo	xxo	xxx		5.60	
22	A	Zach Bradford	United States	xxo	xo	xxo	xxx		5.60	
23	A	Torben Blech	Germany	o	o	xx-	r		5.45	
23	B	Rutger Koppelaar	Netherlands	o	o	xxx			5.45	
25	A	Jin Min-sub	South Korea	–	xo	–	xxx		5.45	
26	B	Alioune Sene	France	xxo	xo	xxx			5.45	
27	A	Daichi Sawano	Japan	–	xxo	xxx			5.45	
28	A	Masaki Ejima	Japan	xo	xxo	xxx			5.45	
29	B	Sondre Guttormsen	Norway	xo	xxx				5.30	
	B	Yao Jie	China	xxx					NH	
	B	Harry Coppell	Great Britain & N.I.						DNS	
	A	Melker Svärd Jacobsson	Sweden						DNS	
	A	Menno Vloon	Netherlands						DNS	

=== Final ===
The final was started on 1 October at 20:06.

Rank	Name	Nationality	5.55	5.70	5.80	5.87	5.92	5.97	6.02	Mark	Notes
1st place, gold medalist(s)	Sam Kendricks	United States	o	o	o	xxo	o	xxo	xx-	5.97	
2nd place, silver medalist(s)	Armand Duplantis	Sweden	–	o	o	xo	xxo	xxo	xxx	5.97	
3rd place, bronze medalist(s)	Piotr Lisek	Poland	o	o	o	xo	x-	xx		5.87	
4	Bo Kanda Lita Baehre	Germany	o	o	xxx					5.70	
5	Thiago Braz	Brazil	xo	o	xxx					5.70	
6	Raphael Holzdeppe	Germany	o	xo	xxx					5.70	
6	Valentin Lavillenie	France	o	xo	xxx					5.70	
8	Claudio Stecchi	Italy	o	xxo	xxx					5.70	
9	Huang Bokai	China	o	xxx						5.55	
10	Augusto Dutra	Brazil	xo	xxx						5.55	
10	Cole Walsh	United States	xo	xxx						5.55	
12	Ben Broeders	Belgium	xxo	xxx						5.55	
