= Seito Yamamoto =

Japanese pole vaulter (born 1992)

Personal information
- Born: 11 March 1992 (age 34)
- Height: 1.81 m (5 ft 11 1/2 in)
- Weight: 70 kg (150 lb)

Sport
- Country: Japan
- Sport: Track and field
- Event: Pole vault
Medal record
Men's athletics
Representing Japan
Asian Games
Gold medal – first place	2018 Jakarta-Palembang	Pole vault
Asian Athletics Championships
Silver medal – second place	2015 Wuhan	Pole vault
Asian Indoor Championships
Silver medal – second place	2016 Doha	Pole vault

Seito Yamamoto (山本 聖途, Yamamoto Seito; born 11 March 1992 in Okazaki, Aichi) is a Japanese pole vaulter. He competed in the pole vault event at the 2012, 2016 and 2020 Summer Olympics failing to clear any height in the qualifying round all three times. His biggest success to date is the sixth place at the 2013 World Championships.

He has personal bests of 5.75 metres outdoors (Hiratsuka 2013) and 5.77 metres indoors (Reno 2016). He is a six-times Japanese national champion and two-times national indoor champion.

He is a graduate of Chukyo University.

== International competitions ==
Representing Japan
Year	Competition	Venue	Position	Notes
2012	Olympic Games	London, United Kingdom	–	NM
2013	Universiade	Kazan, Russia	2nd	5.60 m
2013	World Championships	Moscow, Russia	6th	5.75 m
2013	East Asian Games	Tianjin, China	1st	5.50 m
2014	Asian Games	Incheon, South Korea	–	NM
2015	Asian Championships	Wuhan, China	2nd	5.50 m
2015	World Championships	Beijing, China	23rd (q)	5.65 m
2016	Asian Indoor Championships	Doha, Qatar	2nd	5.60 m
2016	World Indoor Championships	Portland, United States	10th	5.55 m
2016	Olympic Games	Rio de Janeiro, Brazil	–	NM
2016	DécaNation	Marseille, France	2nd	5.60 m
2017	World Championships	London, United Kingdom	26th (q)	5.30 m
2017	DécaNation	Angers, France	3rd	5.50 m
2018	Asian Games	Jakarta, Indonesia	1st	5.70 m
2019	Asian Championships	Doha, Qatar	7th	5.51 m
2019	World Championships	Doha, Qatar	20th (q)	5.60 m
2021	Olympic Games	Tokyo, Japan	25th (q)	5.30 m
2022	World Championships	Eugene, United States	15th (q)	5.65 m
2023	Asian Games	Hangzhou, China	–	NM
2025	Asian Championships	Gumi, South Korea	7th	5.42 m
