= Thiago Braz =

Brazilian pole vaulter (born 1993)

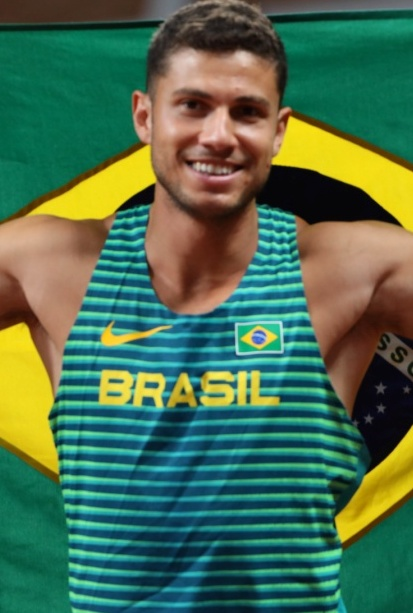
- Braz at the 2020 Summer Olympics, Japan

Personal information
- Nationality: Brazilian
- Born: 16 December 1993 (age 32) Marília, São Paulo, Brazil
- Height: 1.83 m (6 ft 0 in)
- Weight: 75 kg (165 lb)

Sport
- Country: Brazil
- Sport: Athletics
- Event: Pole vault

Achievements and titles
- Personal best: Pole vault: 6.03 m (2016)
Medal record
Men's athletics
Representing Brazil
Olympic Games
| Gold medal – first place | 2016 Rio de Janeiro | Pole vault |
| Bronze medal – third place | 2020 Tokyo | Pole vault |
World Indoor Championships
| Silver medal – second place | 2022 Belgrade | Pole vault |
Youth Olympic Games
| Silver medal – second place | 2010 Singapore | Pole vault |
World Junior Championships
| Gold medal – first place | 2012 Barcelona | Pole vault |

Thiago Braz da Silva (born 16 December 1993) is a Brazilian athlete who is specialized in the pole vault event. Representing Brazil at the international stage, he won the gold medal at the 2016 Summer Olympics and a bronze medal at the 2020 edition.

Braz temporarily held the Men's pole vault Olympic record of 6.03 metres, until Armand Duplantis' new best mark at the 2024 Games (6.25 m).

== Career ==
In 2012, Braz earned the gold medal at the World Junior Championships.

In 2013, he became the South American champion with a new outdoor area record of 5.83 metres. Two years later, in June 2015, he set a new record of 5.92 m in Baku, Azerbaijan.

In February 2016, Braz extended the South American indoor record to 5.93 m in Berlin, Germany.

On 15 August 2016, at the 2016 Olympic Games in Rio de Janeiro, Braz won the gold medal in men's pole vault by beating French pole-vaulter Renaud Lavillenie, the incumbent world record holder and gold medalist in London Olympic Games. In the final, Lavillenie and Braz were the only two athletes to achieve the high of 5.93m, and consequently, they were the only two left to dispute the gold medal. Lavillenie easily cleared the next height, 5.98m, with his first attempt, but da Silva decided to skip 5.98m (as clearing that height would still have left him in silver-medal position on countback) and went on to 6.03m. With a successful second attempt at 6.03m, da Silva set a new Olympic Record. Lavillenie, having failed his first two attempts at 6.03m, attempted 6.08 with his final jump but failed. Thiago Braz da Silva won the gold medal with an Olympic record and surpassed his personal best performance by 10 cm. He was just 1 cm away from matching Brad Walker's Americas record of 6.04 m.

After an Olympic cycle much lower than expected, without medals in World Championships and even in Pan American Games between 2016 and 2020, Braz participated in the 2020 Summer Olympics in Tokyo again without being the favorite, but at the same time, with everyone knowing the possibilities for the Brazilian to win a medal again. At heats, he qualified easily, missing two jumps, but reached the 5.75 mark without needing the third and final attempt at any mark. In the final, he missed an attempt at the 5.70 and 5.80 marks but managed to pass the second time; when he reached 5.87, a mark not so easy to overtake, he beat it on the first attempt, which became crucial to reach the bronze medal. At this point in the race, Renaud Lavillenie, who competed with both feet injured, still had a chance to overtake Braz and gave up from 5.87, passing the bar to 5.92; however, he failed in his attempts and was left without a medal. This ensured Braz on the podium, as only he, the Swede Armand Duplantis, who was the world record holder and favorite for gold, and the American Chris Nilsen, who surprisingly reached 5.97 getting the silver, remained in the race. Braz missed three attempts in the 5.92 and ended up with the bronze. Duplantis easily managed 6.02 and could have tried to break Thiago Braz's Olympic record of 6.03; however, he changed the attempt to 6.19 to beat his own world record of 6.18 but failed. Braz finished with his second consecutive Olympic medal, a very rare feat in Brazilian athletics.

At the 2022 World Athletics Indoor Championships in Belgrade, Serbia, Braz got his first medal in the World Championships, a silver obtained with a jump of 5.95, a new indoor South American record. The gold went to the Swedish Duplantis, who broke the world record there with 6.20.

At the 2022 World Athletics Championships, Braz obtained the best position in the history of Brazil in the World Championships in the pole vault, finishing in 4th place with a jump of 5.87.

In July 2023, Braz tested positive for ostarine and was provisionally suspended by the AIU. On 28 May 2024, he was banned for 16 months by a disciplinary tribunal which heard his case. The ban, which Braz stated he would lodge an appeal against with the Court of Arbitration for Sport, was backdated to the start of his provisional suspension making him eligible to return to competition on 27 November 2024.

== Personal bests ==
- Pole vault (outdoor): 6.03 m – Rio de Janeiro, Brazil, 15 Aug 2016
- Pole vault (indoor): 5.95 m – Belgrade, Serbia, 20 March 2022

== Competition record ==
| Year | Competition | Venue | Position | Result |
Representing Brazil
| 2009 | South American Junior Championships | São Paulo, Brazil | 3rd | 4.40 m |
| 2010 | Youth Olympic Games | Singapore | 2nd | 5.05 m |
| 2010 | South American Youth Championships | Santiago, Chile | 1st | 5.10 m |
| 2011 | Pan American Junior Championships | Miramar, United States | 1st | 5.20 m |
| 2011 | South American Junior Championships | Medellín, Colombia | 2nd | 4.85 m |
| 2012 | World Junior Championships | Barcelona, Spain | 1st | 5.55 m |
| 2013 | South American Championships | Cartagena, Colombia | 1st | 5.83 m |
| 2013 | World Championships | Moscow, Russia | 14th (q) | 5.40 m |
| 2014 | World Indoor Championships | Sopot, Poland | 4th | 5.75 m |
| 2014 | South American Games | Santiago, Chile | – | NM |
| 2015 | Pan American Games | Toronto, Canada | – | NM |
| 2015 | World Championships | Beijing, China | 19th (q) | 5.65 m |
| 2016 | World Indoor Championships | Portland, United States | 12th | 5.55 m |
| 2016 | Olympic Games | Rio de Janeiro, Brazil | 1st | 6.03 m AR |
| 2018 | World Indoor Championships | Birmingham, United Kingdom | 12th | 5.60 m |
| 2019 | South American Championships | Lima, Peru | 2nd | 5.41 m |
| 2019 | Pan American Games | Lima, Peru | 4th | 5.51 m |
| 2019 | World Championships | Doha, Qatar | 5th | 5.70 m |
| 2021 | Olympic Games | Tokyo, Japan | 3rd | 5.87 m |
| 2022 | World Indoor Championships | Belgrade, Serbia | 2nd | 5.95 m iAR |
| 2022 | World Championships | Eugene, United States | 4th | 5.87 m |
| 2025 | South American Championships | Mar del Plata, Argentina | 4th | 5.30 m |

iAR = indoor Area Record
