= Masaki Ejima =

Japanese pole vaulter (born 1999)

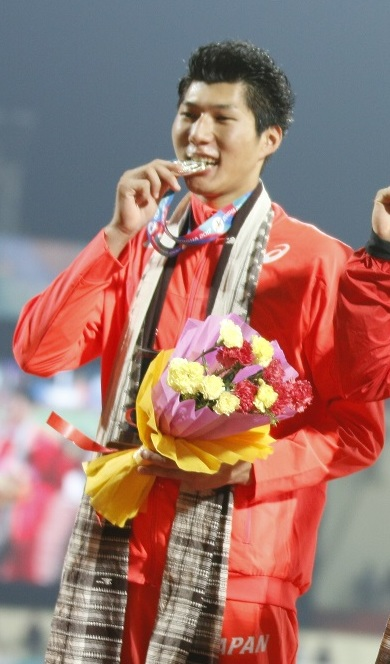
- Masaki Ejima in 2017

Personal information
- Born: 6 March 1999 (age 27) Kanagawa Prefecture, Japan
- Education: Nihon University
- Height: 1.90 m (6 ft 3 in)
- Weight: 79 kg (174 lb)

Sport
- Sport: Athletics
- Event: Pole vault

Masaki Ejima (江島 雅紀, Ejima Masaki; born 6 March 1999) is a Japanese athlete specialising in the pole vault. He represented his country at the 2019 World Championships in Doha without qualifying for the final. In 2018 he won a bronze medal at the World U20 Championships in Tampere.

His personal bests in the event are 5.71 metres outdoors (Kisarazu 2019) and 5.50 metres indoors (Pajulahti 2017).

== International competitions ==
Year	Competition	Venue	Position	Notes
Representing Japan
2015	World Youth Championships	Cali, Colombia	6th	5.00 m
2016	World U20 Championships	Bydgoszcz, Poland	6th	5.35 m
2017	Asian Championships	Bhubaneswar, India	2nd	5.65 m
2017	Universiade	Taipei, Taiwan	4th	5.40 m
2018	World U20 Championships	Tampere, Finland	3rd	5.55 m
2019	Asian Championships	Doha, Qatar	6th	5.51 m
2019	Universiade	Naples, Italy	7th	5.21 m
2019	World Championships	Doha, Qatar	28th (q)	5.45 m
2021	Olympic Games	Tokyo, Japan	25th (q)	5.30 m
2026	Asian Indoor Championships	Tianjin, China	5th	5.20 m
