= Ding Bangchao =

Chinese pole vaulter (born 1996)

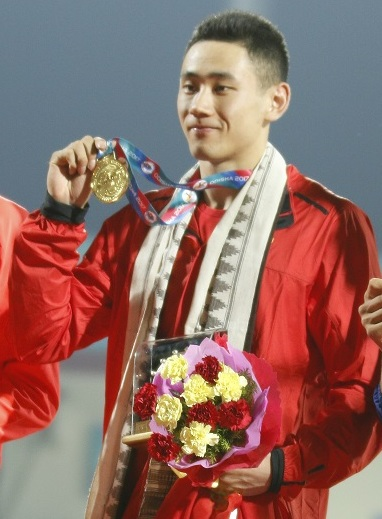
- Ding Bangchao in 2017

Personal information
- Born: 11 October 1996 (age 29)

Sport
- Sport: Athletics
- Event: Pole vault

Ding Bangchao (Chinese: 丁邦超; born 11 October 1996) is a Chinese athlete specialising in the pole vault. He represented his country at the 2019 World Championships in Doha without qualifying for the final. In 2017 he won a gold medal at the Asian Championships in Bhubaneswar, India.

His personal bests in the event are 5.71 metres outdoors (Zhaoqing 2019) and 5.60 metres indoors (Xi'an 2019).

== International competitions ==
| Year | Competition | Venue | Position | Notes |
Representing China
| 2017 | Asian Championships | Bhubaneswar, India | 1st | 5.65 m |
| 2019 | World Championships | Doha, Qatar | 21st (q) | 5.60 m |
