= KC Lightfoot =

American pole vaulter (born 1999)

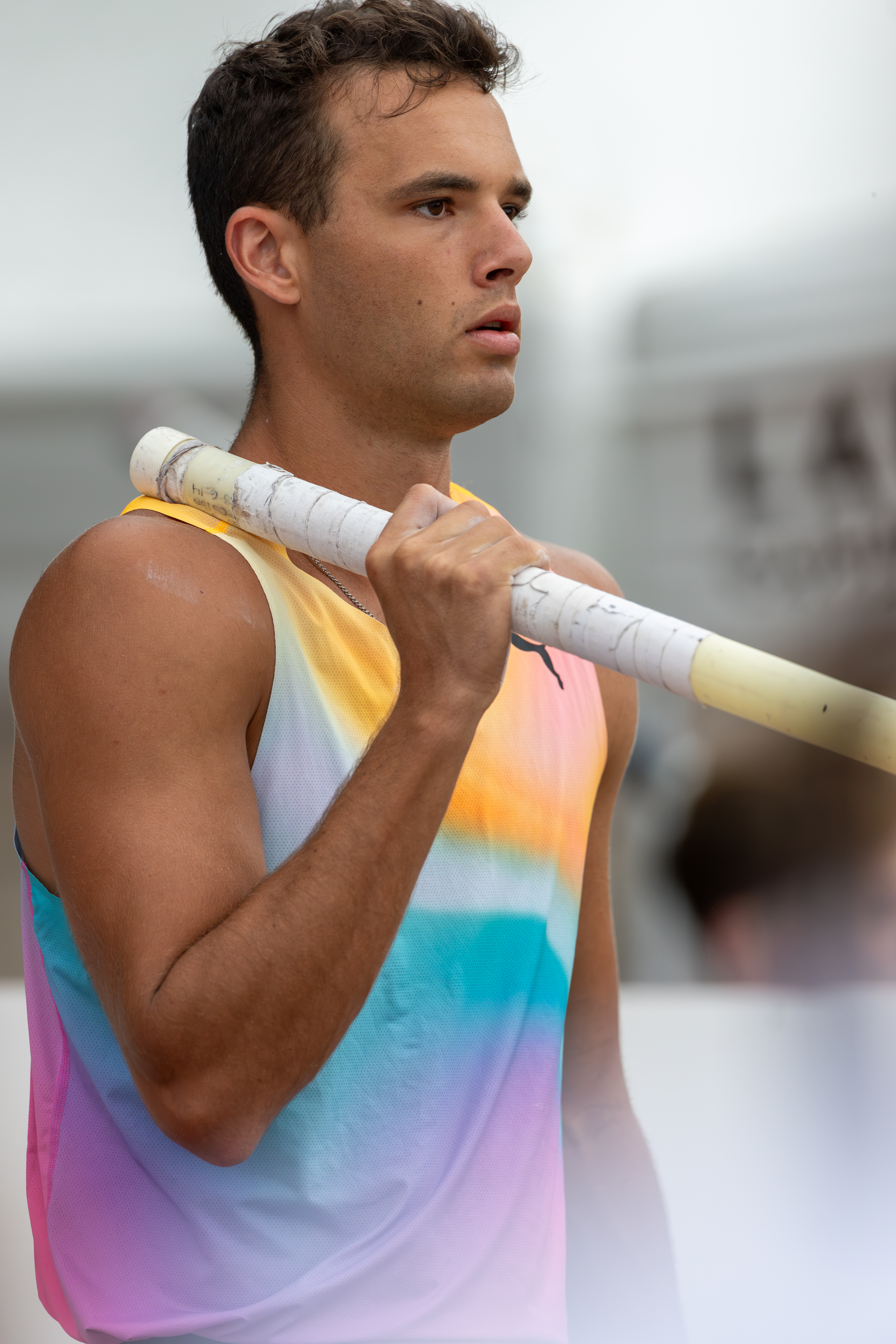

Personal information
- Nationality: American
- Born: November 11, 1999 (age 26) Lee's Summit, Missouri, U.S.
- Height: 6 ft 2 in (188 cm)

Sport
- Country: United States
- Sport: Track and field
- Event: Pole vault
- College team: Baylor University

Achievements and titles
- Personal bests: Pole vault: 6.00 m (19 ft 8 in) indoor (2021); 6.07 m (19 ft 10 3/4 in) outdoor (2023)

KC Lightfoot (born November 11, 1999) is an American pole vaulter. He holds the American record with a clearance of 6.07 m (19 ft 11 in) at the Music City Track Carnival in Nashville on June 2, 2023. This broke the record of 6.06 set by Sam Kendricks, the 2017 and 2019 World champion, in 2019. Lightfoot now ranks fifth on the world all-time list behind Swedish-American Armand Duplantis (6.30 m outdoors, 6.31 m indoors, reigning Olympic and world champion), Greek Emmanouil Karalis (6.17 indoors, 6.20 m outdoors), Frenchman Renaud Lavillenie (6.16 m indoors) and Ukrainian Sergey Bubka (6.15 m indoors, 6.14 m outdoors). He placed fourth at the 2020 Summer Olympics.

== Competition record ==
Year	Competition	Venue	Position	Notes
Representing United States
2021	Olympic Games	Tokyo, Japan	4th	5.80 m (19 ft 0 in)
2019	World Championships	Doha, Qatar	15th	5.60 m (18 ft 4 in)

=== US Track and field Championships ===
Year	Competition	Venue	Position	Event	Notes
2021	United States Olympic Trials	Eugene, Oregon	2nd	Pole vault	5.85 m (19 ft 2 in)
2019	USA Outdoor Track and Field Championships	Des Moines, Iowa	3rd	Pole vault	5.76 m (18 ft 11 in)
2018	USA Outdoor Track and Field Championships	Des Moines, Iowa	13th	Pole vault	NH @ 4.54 m (14 ft 11 in)
2018	New Balance Indoor Nationals	New York, New York	2nd	Pole vault	5.15 m (16 ft 11 in)
2017	2017 USA U20 Track and Field Championships	Sacramento, California	4th	Pole vault	5.15 m (16 ft 11 in)
2017	New Balance Nationals Outdoor	Greensboro, North Carolina	6th	Pole vault	4.81 m (15 ft 9 in)
2016	USATF Junior Olympic Track & Field Championships	Sacramento, California	3rd	Pole vault	5.30 m (17 ft 5 in)

He finished third at the 2019 USA Outdoor Track and Field Championships with a personal best jump of 5.76 m.
