= Hussain Al-Hizam =

Saudi Arabian pole vaulter (born 1998)

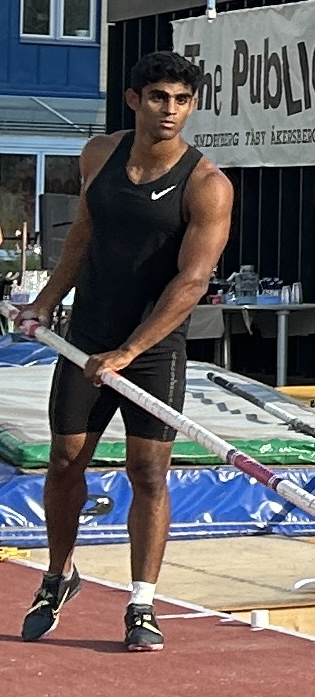
- Hussain Al-Hizam in 2024

Personal information
- Born: 4 January 1998 (age 28) Jubail, Saudi Arabia
- Education: University of Kansas
- Height: 1.8 m (5 ft 11 in)

Sport
- Sport: Athletics
- Event: Pole vault
- College team: Kansas Jayhawks

Achievements and titles
- Personal bests: 5.72 m NR (2025)
Medal record
Men's athletics
Representing Saudi Arabia
Asian Games
Bronze medal – third place	2022 Hangzhou	Pole vault
Asian Championships
Silver medal – second place	2023 Bangkok	Pole vault
Asian Indoor Championships
Gold medal – first place	2023 Astana	Pole vault
Bronze medal – third place	2024 Tehran	Pole vault
Islamic Solidarity Games
Gold medal – first place	2017 Baku	Pole vault
Gold medal – first place	2025 Riyadh	Pole vault
Silver medal – second place	2021 Konya	Pole vault
Arab Championships
Gold medal – first place	2021 Radès	Pole vault
Silver medal – second place	2013 Doha	Pole vault
Silver medal – second place	2025 Oran	Pole vault
Bronze medal – third place	2023 Marrakesh	Pole vault
GCC Games
Gold medal – first place	2022 Kuwait	Pole vault
Asian Youth Games
Gold medal – first place	2013 Nanjing	Pole vault

Hussain Al-Hizam (Arabic: حسين عاصم آل حزام; born 4 January 1998) is a Saudi Arabian athlete specialising in the pole vault.

== Career ==
After returning home from the Youth Olympics in China in 2014, Al Hizam missed the pit completely, fell to the ground and suffered a spinal fracture. Al Hizam spent a year recovering and training in Los Angeles.

Al-Hizam was an NCAA champion vaulter for the Kansas Jayhawks track and field team, winning the pole vault at the 2018 NCAA Division I Indoor Track and Field Championships.

His personal bests in the event are 5.70 metres outdoors (Austin 2021) and 5.70 metres indoors (2018). Both are current national records.

His father, Asim Al-Hizam, is a former decathlete and a current athletics coach.

== Competition record ==
Year	Competition	Venue	Position	Notes
Representing Saudi Arabia
2013	Arab Championships	Doha, Qatar	2nd	4.90 m
2013	Asian Youth Games	Nanjing, China	1st	4.70 m
2013	Islamic Solidarity Games	Palembang, Indonesia	5th	4.60 m
2014	Asian Junior Championships	Taipei, Taiwan	4th	4.85 m
2014	Youth Olympic Games	Nanjing, China	4th	4.85 m
2014	Asian Games	Incheon, South Korea	9th	4.95 m
2015	World Youth Championships	Cali, Colombia	7th (q)	4.95 m^{1}
2016	Asian Junior Championships	Ho Chi Minh City, Vietnam	5th	5.00 m
2016	World U20 Championships	Bydgoszcz, Poland	15th (q)	5.10 m
2017	Islamic Solidarity Games	Baku, Azerbaijan	1st	5.55 m
2017	Asian Championships	Bhubaneswar, India	7th	5.20 m
2018	Asian Games	Jakarta, Indonesia	5th	5.40 m
2021	Arab Championships	Radès, Tunisia	1st	5.55 m
2022	GCC Games	Kuwait City, Kuwait	1st	5.61 m
2022	World Championships	Eugene, United States	14th (q)	5.65 m
2022	Islamic Solidarity Games	Konya, Turkey	2nd	5.40 m
2023	Asian Indoor Championships	Astana, Kazakhstan	1st	5.45 m
2023	Arab Championships	Marrakesh, Morocco	3rd	5.20 m
2023	Asian Championships	Bangkok, Thailand	2nd	5.56 m
2023	World Championships	Budapest, Hungary	26th (q)	5.35 m
2023	Asian Games	Hangzhou, China	3rd	5.65 m
2024	Asian Indoor Championships	Tehran, Iran	3rd	5.55 m
2024	Olympic Games	Paris, France	–	NM
2025	Arab Championships	Oran, Algeria	2nd	5.45 m
2025	Asian Championships	Gumi, South Korea	6th	5.42 m
2025	World Championships	Tokyo, Japan	17th (q)	5.70 m
2025	Islamic Solidarity Games	Riyadh, Saudi Arabia	1st	5.65 m
2026	GCC Games	Doha, Qatar	2nd	5.50 m

^{1}No mark in the final
