= Vladyslav Malykhin =

Ukrainian pole vaulter (born 1998)

Vladyslav Oleksiyovych Malykhin (Ukrainian: Владислав Олексійович Малихін; born 15 January 1998) is a Ukrainian pole vaulter.

He finished seventh at the 2014 Summer Youth Olympics, won the silver medal at the 2015 World Youth Championships and finished eighth at the 2016 World U20 Championships. He also competed at the 2017 World Championships without reaching the final.

His personal best vault is 5.70 metres, achieved in May 2017 in Żary.
