= 2013 World Championships in Athletics – Men's pole vault =

Men's pole vault at the 2013 World Championships
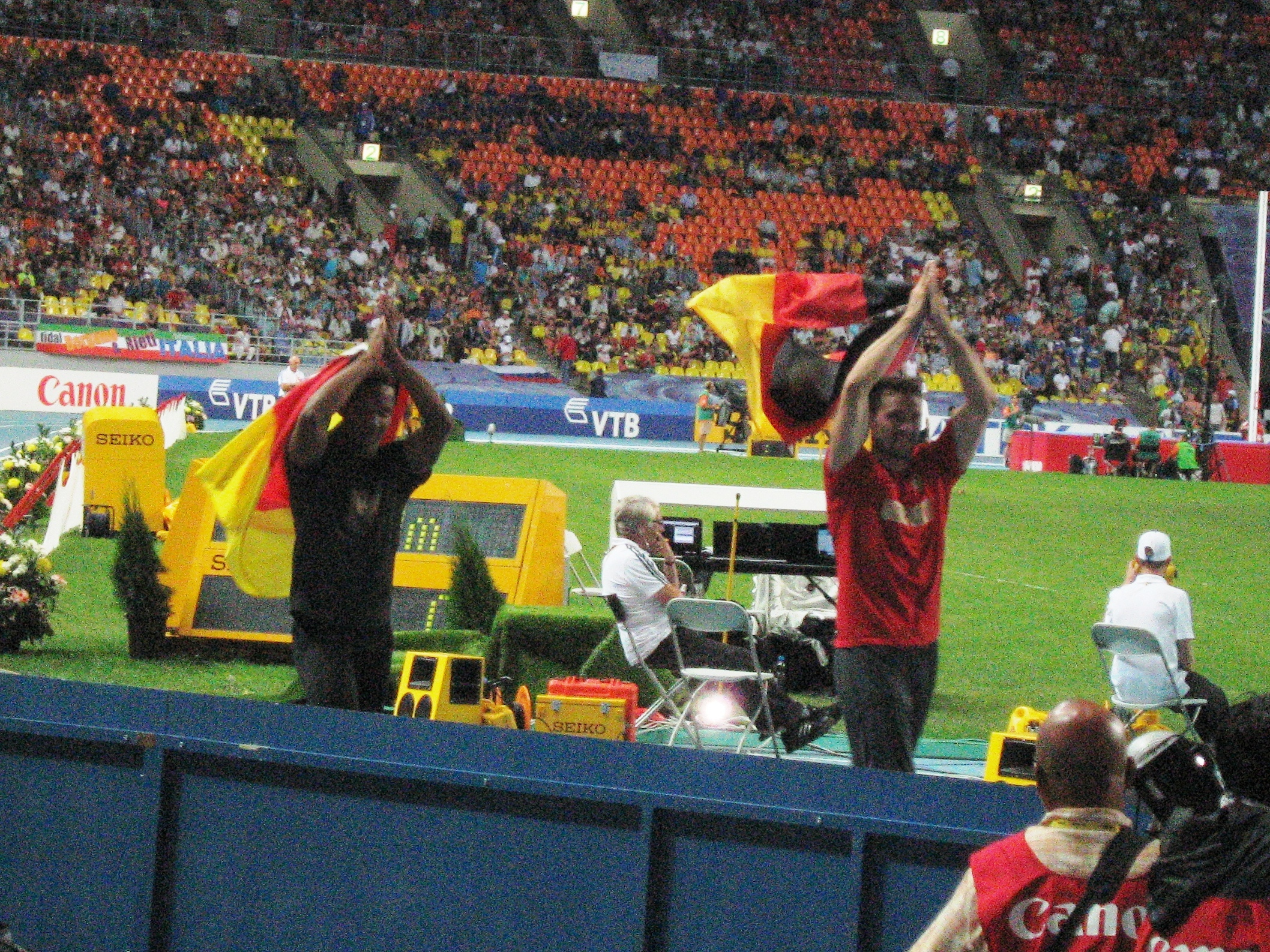
- Venue: Luzhniki Stadium
- Dates: 10 August (qualification); 12 August (final)
- Competitors: 40 from 24 nations
- Winning height: 5.89 m (19 ft 3 3/4 in)

Medalists
gold medal	Raphael Holzdeppe; Germany
silver medal	Renaud Lavillenie; France
bronze medal	Björn Otto; Germany

The men's pole vault at the 2013 World Championships in Athletics was held at the Luzhniki Stadium on 10–12 August.

== Records ==
Prior to the competition, the records were as follows:

World record	Sergey Bubka (UKR)	6.14A	Sestriere, Italy	31 July 1994
Championship record	Dmitri Markov (AUS)	6.05	Edmonton, Canada	9 August 2001
World Leading	Renaud Lavillenie (FRA)	6.02	London, United Kingdom	27 July 2013
African record	Okkert Brits (RSA)	6.03	Cologne, Germany	18 August 1995
Asian record	Grigoriy Yegorov (KAZ)	5.90	Stuttgart, Germany	19 August 1993
North, Central American and Caribbean record	Brad Walker (USA)	6.04	Eugene, United States	8 June 2008
South American record	Thiago Braz da Silva (BRA)	5.83	Cartagena, Colombia	5 July 2013
European record	Sergey Bubka (UKR)	6.14A	Sestriere, Italy	31 July 1994
Oceanian record	Dmitri Markov (AUS)	6.05	Edmonton, Canada	9 August 2001

== Qualification standards ==
A result	B result
5.70	5.60

== Schedule ==
Date	Time	Round
10 August 2013	10:15	Qualification
12 August 2013	20:25	Final

All times are local times (UTC+4)

== Results ==
KEY:	Q	Qualified	q	12 best performers	NR	National record	PB	Personal best	SB	Seasonal best

=== Qualification ===
Qualification: 5.70 m (Q) and at least 12 best (q) advanced to the final.

Rank	Group	Name	Nationality	5.25	5.40	5.55	5.65	5.70	Mark	Notes
1	A	Jan Kudlička	Czech Republic	-	o	-	xo		5.65	q
1	B	Renaud Lavillenie	France	-	-	-	xo		5.65	q
3	B	Brad Walker	United States	-	-	o			5.55	q
3	A	Malte Mohr	Germany	-	-	o			5.55	q
3	A	Konstadinos Filippidis	Greece	-	o	o			5.55	q
6	B	Augusto de Oliveira	Brazil	-	xxo	o			5.55	q
7	B	Björn Otto	Germany	-	-	xo			5.55	q
7	A	Seito Yamamoto	Japan	-	o	xo			5.55	q
7	A	Raphael Holzdeppe	Germany	-	-	xo			5.55	q
7	A	Alhaji Jeng	Sweden	-	o	xo			5.55	q
11	A	Valentin Lavillenie	France	xxo	o	xo			5.55	q
12	A	Xue Changrui	China	o	o	xxo			5.55	q
13	A	Sergey Kucheryanu	Russia	-	xo	xxo			5.55	q
14	A	Oleksandr Korchmid	Ukraine	-	o	xxx			5.40	
14	A	Thiago Braz da Silva	Brazil	-	o	xxx			5.40	
14	A	Daichi Sawano	Japan	-	o	xxx			5.40	
14	A	Jere Bergius	Finland	o	o	xxx			5.40	
14	B	Nikita Filippov	Kazakhstan	o	o	xxx			5.40	
19	B	Ivan Yeryomin	Ukraine	xo	o	xxx			5.40	
19	B	Jeremy Scott	United States	xo	o	xxx			5.40	
21	B	Hiroki Ogita	Japan	-	xo	xxx			5.40	
21	B	Lázaro Borges	Cuba	-	xo	xxx			5.40	
21	B	Vladyslav Revenko	Ukraine	-	xo	xxx			5.40	
24	A	Edi Maia	Portugal	xo	xo	xxx			5.40	
24	A	Jack Whitt	United States	xo	xo	xxx			5.40	
24	B	Aleksandr Gripich	Russia	xo	xo	xxx			5.40	
27	A	Shawnacy Barber	Canada	xo	xxo	xxx			5.40	
28	A	Claudio Stecchi	Italy	xxo	xxo	xxx			5.40	
29	B	João Gabriel Sousa	Brazil	o	xxx				5.25	
29	B	Jin Min-Sub	South Korea	o	xxx				5.25	
31	A	Rasmus Wejnold Jørgensen	Denmark	xo	xxx				5.25	
31	B	Yang Yansheng	China	xo	xxx				5.25	
33	A	Mareks Ārents	Latvia	xxo	xxx				5.25	
	A	Zhang Wei	China	xxx					NM	
	B	Ivan Horvat	Croatia	xxx					NM	
	B	Steven Lewis	Great Britain & N.I.	-	xxx				NM	
	B	Giuseppe Gibilisco	Italy	-	-	xxx			NM	
	B	Robert Sobera	Poland	-	xxx				NM	
	B	Igor Bychkov	Spain	xxx					NM	
	B	Michal Balner	Czech Republic	-	xxx				NM	

=== Final ===
The final was started at 19:00.

Rank	Name	Nationality	5.50	5.65	5.75	5.82	5.89	5.96	Mark	Notes
1st place, gold medalist(s)	Raphael Holzdeppe	Germany	–	o	–	o	o	xxx	5.89	
2nd place, silver medalist(s)	Renaud Lavillenie	France	–	xo	–	xo	xxo	xxx	5.89	
3rd place, bronze medalist(s)	Björn Otto	Germany	o	o	xo	o	xxx		5.82	
4	Brad Walker	United States	–	xo	xo	o	xxx		5.82	
5	Malte Mohr	Germany	o	o	xo	xxo	xxx		5.82	
6	Seito Yamamoto	Japan	o	xxo	xxo	xxx			5.75	PB
7	Jan Kudlička	Czech Republic	xxo	xo	xxo	xxx			5.75	
8	Sergey Kucheryanu	Russia	o	o	xxx				5.65	
9	Alhaji Jeng	Sweden	xo	o	xxx				5.65	SB
10	Konstadinos Filippidis	Greece	o	xo	xxx				5.65	
11	Augusto de Oliveira	Brazil	xxo	xxo	xxx				5.65	
12	Xue Changrui	China	xo	xxx					5.50	
	Valentin Lavillenie	France	xxx						NM	
