= 2011 European Athletics U23 Championships – Men's pole vault =

The men's pole vault at the 2011 European Athletics U23 Championships was held at the Městský stadion on 14 and 16 July.

== Medalists ==
Gold	Paweł Wojciechowski; Poland (POL)
Silver	Karsten Dilla; Germany (GER)
Bronze	Dmitriy Zhelyabin; Russia (RUS)

== Schedule ==
Date	Time	Round
14 July 2011	10:00	Qualification
16 July 2011	17:00	Final

== Results ==
=== Qualification ===
Qualification: Qualification Performance 5.35 (Q) or at least 12 best performers advanced to the final.

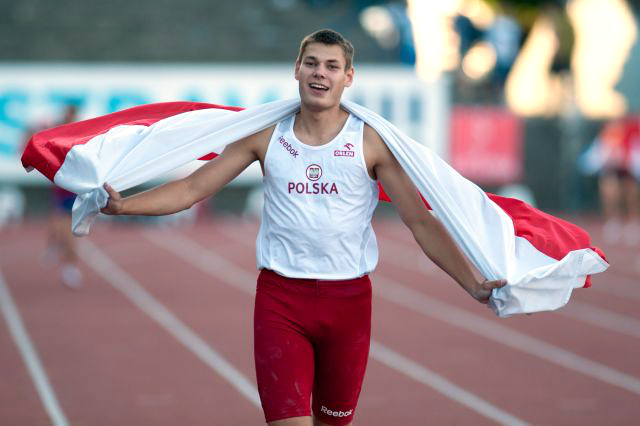
Paweł Wojciechowski after winning the competition

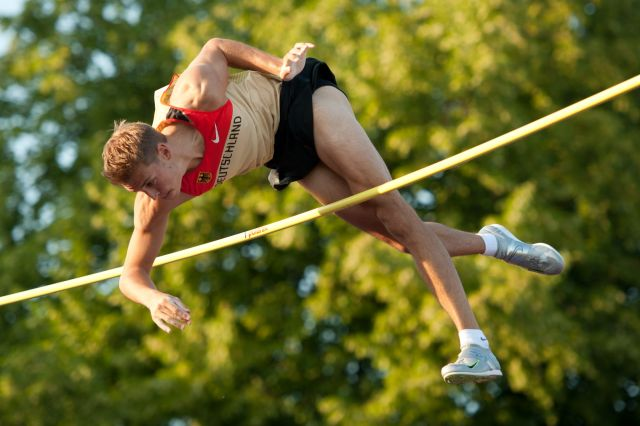
Silver medalist, Karsten Dilla

Rank	Group	Athlete	Nationality	4.80	4.95	5.10	5.15	5.20	5.35	Result	Notes
1	A	Raphael Holzdeppe	Germany	-	-	-	-	-	xo	5.35	Q
2	B	Karsten Dilla	Germany	-	-	-	-	o	-	5.20	q
3	B	Paweł Wojciechowski	Poland	-	-	-	-	xo	-	5.20	q
4	B	Anton Ivakin	Russia	-	-	-	o			5.15	q
5	A	Adam Pašiak	Czech Republic	-	o	-	xxo			5.15	q
6	A	Noël Ost	France	-	o	o				5.10	q
6	A	Dmitriy Zhelyabin	Russia	-	-	o				5.10	q
8	B	Pauls Pujāts	Latvia	o	-	xo	xxx			5.10	q
8	A	Rasmus Jørgensen	Denmark	-	o	xo				5.10	q
10	A	Ivan Yeryomin	Ukraine	-	xxo	xo				5.10	q
11	A	Robert Sobera	Poland	-	-	xxo				5.10	q
11	B	Claudio Michel Stecchi	Italy	-	-	xxo				5.10	q
13	A	Gayk Kazaryan	Russia	-	o	xxx				4.95	
13	A	Alexandre Marchand	France	-	o	xxx				4.95	
13	B	Nikandros Stylianou	Cyprus	-	o	xxx				4.95	
16	B	Alexandre Feger	France	-	xo	xxx				4.95	
16	B	Diogo Ferreira	Portugal	o	xo	xxx				4.95	
18	A	Mario García	Spain	o	xxx					4.80	
18	B	Florian Gaul	Germany	o	xxx					4.80	
–	A	Manuel Concepción	Spain	-	xxx					NM	

=== Final ===
Rank	Athlete	Nationality	4.95	5.10	5.20	5.30	5.35	5.40	5.45	5.50	5.55	5.60	5.65	5.70	5.75	5.85	Result	Notes
1st place, gold medalist(s)	Paweł Wojciechowski	Poland	-	-	-	-	-	xo	-	-	xo	-	o	o	x-	xx	5.70	PB
2nd place, silver medalist(s)	Karsten Dilla	Germany	-	-	-	o	-	-	-	o	-	o	-	x-	xx		5.60	
3rd place, bronze medalist(s)	Dmitriy Zhelyabin	Russia	-	-	o	-	o	-	o	-	o	xx-	x				5.55	PB
4	Claudio Stecchi	Italy	-	-	xo	-	o	-	xo	-	xo	xxx					5.55	PB
5	Anton Ivakin	Russia	-	-	o	-	-	xo	-	o	-	xxx					5.50	=PB
6	Raphael Holzdeppe	Germany	-	-	-	-	-	-	-	xo	-	-	x-	x-	x		5.50	
7	Ivan Yeryomin	Ukraine	-	o	o	o	-	xxx									5.30	
8	Rasmus Wejnold Jørgensen	Denmark	-	o	-	xo	-	x-	xx								5.30	
9	Pauls Pujāts	Latvia	o	o	o	xxo	xxx										5.30	=PB
10	Noël Ost	France	o	o	o	xxx											5.20	
11	Robert Sobera	Poland	-	-	xo	-	-	xxx									5.20	
12	Adam Pašiak	Czech Republic	o	-	xxo	xxx											5.20	

== Participation ==
According to an unofficial count, 21 athletes from 13 countries participated in the event.

- Cyprus (1)
- Czech Republic (1)
- Denmark (1)
- France (3)
- Germany (3)
- Italy (1)
- Latvia (1)
- Poland (2)
- Portugal (1)
- Russia (3)
- Spain (2)
- Switzerland (1)
- Ukraine (1)
