= 2013 European Athletics U23 Championships – Men's pole vault =

The Men's pole vault event at the 2013 European Athletics U23 Championships was held in Tampere, Finland, at Ratina Stadium on 12 and 14 July.

== Medalists ==
Gold	Anton Ivakin; Russia
Silver	Robert Sobera; Poland
Bronze	Daniel Clemens; Germany
Bronze	Valentin Lavillenie; France

== Results ==
=== Final ===
14 July 2013

Rank	Name	Nationality	Attempts										Result	Notes
Rank	Name	Nationality	5.00	5.10	5.20	5.30	5.40	5.45	5.50	5.55	5.60	5.65	Result	Notes
1st place, gold medalist(s)	Anton Ivakin	Russia	-	-	-	-	xo	-	xo	-	xo	xxx	5.60	
2nd place, silver medalist(s)	Robert Sobera	Poland	-	-	-	o	-	-	o	-	xxo	xxx	5.60	
3rd place, bronze medalist(s)	Daniel Clemens	Germany	-	-	o	-	xo	-	xo	-	xxx		5.50	=PB
3rd place, bronze medalist(s)	Valentin Lavillenie	France	-	-	-	xo	-	-	xo	-	xxx		5.50	
5	Panayiótis Láskaris	Greece	-	o	-	xxo	o	-	xxx				5.40	=PB
6	Stanley Joseph	France	-	-	xo	xo	xo	xxx					5.40	=SB
7	Claudio Michel Stecchi	Italy	-	-	-	o	-	-	xxx				5.30	
8	Jax Thoirs	United Kingdom	-	o	-	xo	-	xxx					5.30	
9	Florian Gaul	Germany	-	o	-	xxo	xxx						5.30	
10	Ivan Horvat	Croatia	o	-	o	-	xxx						5.20	
10	Theódoros-Panayiótis Hrisanthópoulos	Greece	-	-	o	xxx							5.20	
	Ilya Mudrov	Russia	-	-	xxx								NM	
	Carlo Paech	Germany	-	-	-	xxx							NM	
	Didac Salas	Spain	-	-	xxx								NM	

=== Qualifications ===
Qualified: qualifying perf. 5.40 (Q) or 12 best performers (q) advance to the Final

==== Summary ====
Rank	Name	Nationality	Result	Notes
1	Daniel Clemens	Germany	5.35	q
1	Valentin Lavillenie	France	5.35	q
1	Robert Sobera	Poland	5.35	q
1	Claudio Michel Stecchi	Italy	5.35	q
5	Florian Gaul	Germany	5.35	q
5	Panayiótis Láskaris	Greece	5.35	q =SB
5	Carlo Paech	Germany	5.35	q
8	Theódoros-Panayiótis Hrisanthópoulos	Greece	5.35	q =PB
9	Didac Salas	Spain	5.35	q
9	Jax Thoirs	United Kingdom	5.35	q
11	Ilya Mudrov	Russia	5.35	q
12	Stanley Joseph	France	5.35	q
13	Ivan Horvat	Croatia	5.30	q
13	Anton Ivakin	Russia	5.30	q
15	Kévin Menaldo	France	5.25	
16	Marquis Richards	Switzerland	5.25	SB
17	Piotr Lisek	Poland	5.20	
17	Pauls Pujāts	Latvia	5.20	
19	Rutger Koppelaar	Netherlands	5.20	
20	Lukáš Posekaný	Czech Republic	5.10	
21	Andreas Duplantis	Sweden	5.10	
22	Arvid Lindahl	Sweden	5.10	
23	Manel Miralles	Spain	5.10	
24	Per Magne Florvaag	Norway	4.95	
24	Ruben Miranda	Portugal	4.95	
26	Simone Fusiani	Italy	4.95	
27	Óscar Oliver	Spain	4.80	

==== Details ====
===== Group A =====
12 July 2013 / 19:15

Rank	Name	Nationality	Attempts							Result	Notes
Rank	Name	Nationality	4.80	4.95	5.10	5.20	5.25	5.30	5.35	Result	Notes
1	Valentin Lavillenie	France	-	-	-	-	o	-	o	5.35	q
1	Robert Sobera	Poland	-	-	-	-	o	-	o	5.35	q
1	Claudio Michel Stecchi	Italy	-	-	-	-	-	-	o	5.35	q
4	Florian Gaul	Germany	-	-	o	-	-	xo	o	5.35	q
5	Theódoros-Panayiótis Hrisanthópoulos	Greece	-	xo	-	xxo	-	xo	o	5.35	q =PB
6	Didac Salas	Spain	-	-	xo	-	-	o	xo	5.35	q
7	Ilya Mudrov	Russia	-	-	-	xo	-	xo	xo	5.35	q
8	Kévin Menaldo	France	-	-	-	-	o	-	xxx	5.25	
9	Marquis Richards	Switzerland	-	o	o	xo	xo	xxx		5.25	SB
10	Pauls Pujāts	Latvia	-	-	-	o	-	xxx		5.20	
11	Lukáš Posekaný	Czech Republic	o	o	o	xxx				5.10	
12	Andreas Duplantis	Sweden	-	-	xo	-	xxx			5.10	
13	Manel Miralles	Spain	o	xo	xxo	-	xxx			5.10	

===== Group B =====
12 July 2013 / 19:15

Rank	Name	Nationality	Attempts							Result	Notes
Rank	Name	Nationality	4.80	4.95	5.10	5.20	5.25	5.30	5.35	Result	Notes
1	Daniel Clemens	Germany	-	-	o	-	o	-	o	5.35	q
2	Panayiótis Láskaris	Greece	-	-	o	-	xo	-	o	5.35	q =SB
2	Carlo Paech	Germany	-	-	-	xo	-	-	o	5.35	q
4	Jax Thoirs	United Kingdom	-	-	o	-	xo	-	xo	5.35	q
5	Stanley Joseph	France	-	-	o	-	xo	o	xxo	5.35	q
6	Ivan Horvat	Croatia	-	o	o	o	-	o	-	5.30	q
6	Anton Ivakin	Russia	-	-	-	-	-	o	-	5.30	q
8	Piotr Lisek	Poland	-	-	-	o	-	xxx		5.20	
9	Rutger Koppelaar	Netherlands	-	o	xo	o	-	xxx		5.20	
10	Arvid Lindahl	Sweden	-	o	xxo	-	xxx			5.10	
11	Per Magne Florvaag	Norway	o	o	xxx					4.95	
11	Ruben Miranda	Portugal	o	o	xxx					4.95	
13	Simone Fusiani	Italy	-	xxo	xxx					4.95	
14	Óscar Oliver	Spain	xxo	xxx						4.80	

== Participation ==
According to an unofficial count, 27 athletes from 16 countries participated in the event.

- Croatia (1)
- Czech Republic (1)
- France (3)
- Germany (3)
- Greece (2)
- Italy (2)
- Latvia (1)
- Netherlands (1)
- Norway (1)
- Poland (2)
- Portugal (1)
- Russia (2)
- Spain (3)
- Sweden (2)
- Switzerland (1)
- United Kingdom (1)
