= 2013 European Athletics Indoor Championships – Men's pole vault =

The Men's pole vault event at the 2013 European Athletics Indoor Championships was held on March 2, 2013 at 11:00 & 13:30 (qualification) and March 3, 16:33 (final) local time.

== Records ==
Standing records prior to the 2013 European Athletics Indoor Championships
World record	Sergey Bubka (UKR)	6.15	Donetsk, Ukraine	21 February 1993
European record	Sergey Bubka (UKR)	6.15	Donetsk, Ukraine	21 February 1993
Championship record	Renaud Lavillenie (FRA)	6.03	Paris, France	5 March 2011
World Leading	Renaud Lavillenie (FRA)	5.94	Metz, France	24 February 2013
European Leading	Renaud Lavillenie (FRA)	5.94	Metz, France	24 February 2013

== Results ==
=== Qualification ===
Qualification: Qualification Performance 5.75 (Q) or at least 8 best performers advanced to the final.

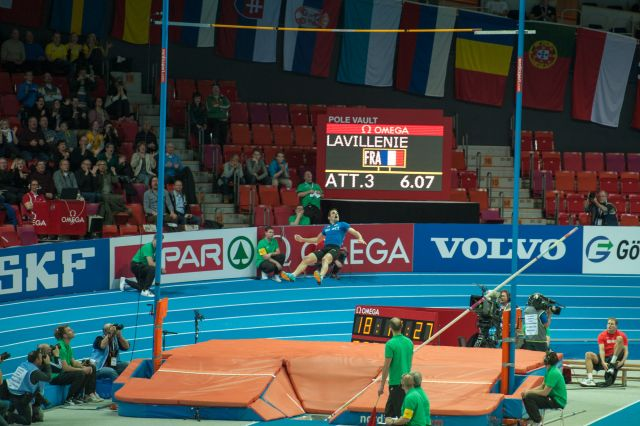
Renaud Lavillenie cleared 6.07 in the final, but the attempt was deemed invalid by the judges

Rank	Group	Athlete	Nationality	5.20	5.40	5.50	5.60	5.70	5.75	Result	Note
1	A	Björn Otto	Germany	–	–	–	xo	–	o	5.75	Q
2	A	Konstadinos Filippidis	Greece	–	o	o	o	xxo	o	5.75	Q
3	A	Jan Kudlička	Czech Republic	–	o	–	xo	o		5.70	q
3	A	Steven Lewis	Great Britain	–	o	–	xo	o		5.70	q, SB
5	B	Renaud Lavillenie	France	–	–	–	o	xo		5.70	q
6	A	Robert Sobera	Poland	o	o	o	o	xxx		5.60	q, PB
6	B	Raphael Holzdeppe	Germany	–	–	–	o	–		5.60	q
6	B	Malte Mohr	Germany	–	–	–	o	–		5.60	q
9	A	Ivan Horvat	Croatia	o	o	xxo	o	xr		5.60	=NR
10	B	Ivan Yeryomin	Ukraine	o	o	xo	xo	xxx		5.60	PB
11	A	Mareks Ārents	Latvia	o	o	o	xxx			5.50	
12	B	Piotr Lisek	Poland	o	xo	o	x–	xx		5.50	=PB
12	B	Giorgio Piantella	Italy	o	xo	o	xxx			5.50	=SB
14	A	Melker Svärd-Jacobsson	Sweden	o	xxo	o	xxx			5.50	PB
15	B	Stanley Joseph	France	o	o	xo	xxx			5.50	
16	B	Robert Renner	Slovenia	o	xo	xo	xxx			5.50	
17	B	Alhaji Jeng	Sweden	–	o	–	xxx			5.40	
17	B	Rasmus Jørgensen	Denmark	o	o	xxx				5.40	
17	A	Oleksandr Korchmid	Ukraine	o	o	xx–	x			5.40	=SB
20	A	Nikandros Stylianou	Cyprus	o	xxo	xxx				5.40	=NR
21	B	Eemeli Salomäki	Finland	xo	xxo	xxx				5.40	
22	B	Edi Maia	Portugal	xo	xxx					5.20	
23	A	Andrej Poljanec	Slovenia	xxo	xxx					5.20	
	A	Emile Denecker	France	xxx						NM	
	A	Anton Ivakin	Russia	–	xxx					NM	

=== Final ===
The final was held at 16:33.

Rank	Athlete	Nationality	5.41	5.51	5.61	5.71	5.76	5.81	5.86	5.91	5.96	6.01	6.07	Result	Note
1st place, gold medalist(s)	Renaud Lavillenie	France	–	–	o	–	o	–	o	o	o	o	xxx	6.01	WL
2nd place, silver medalist(s)	Björn Otto	Germany	–	–	o	–	o	–	x–	–	x–	x		5.76	
3rd place, bronze medalist(s)	Malte Mohr	Germany	–	–	xxo	–	xo	xxx						5.76	
4	Konstadinos Filippidis	Greece	–	–	o	–	xxo	xxx						5.76	
5	Jan Kudlička	Czech Republic	xo	–	o	o	–	xxx						5.71	
6	Steven Lewis	Great Britain	–	o	–	xxo	–	xxx						5.71	SB
6	Robert Sobera	Poland	o	o	o	xxo	xx–	x						5.71	PB
8	Raphael Holzdeppe	Germany	–	–	xxo	–	xxx							5.61	
