= 2015 European Athletics Indoor Championships – Men's pole vault =

The men's pole vault event at the 2015 European Athletics Indoor Championships was held on 6 March at 10:15 (qualification) and 7 March at 17:00 (final) local time.

== Medalists ==
Gold	Silver	Bronze
Renaud Lavillenie; France	Aleksandr Gripich; Russia	Piotr Lisek; Poland

== Results ==
=== Qualification ===
Qualification: Qualification Performance 5.75 (Q) or at least 8 best performers advanced to the final.

Rank	Athlete	Nationality	5.05	5.25	5.45	5.60	5.70	Result	Note
1	Aleksandr Gripich	Russia	–	o	o	o	o	5.70	q
1	Robert Sobera	Poland	–	–	o	o	o	5.70	q
3	Konstadinos Filippidis	Greece	–	–	o	xo	o	5.70	q
3	Tobias Scherbarth	Germany	–	–	xo	o	o	5.70	q, =SB
5	Jan Kudlička	Czech Republic	–	–	xo	xxo	o	5.70	q, SB
6	Piotr Lisek	Poland	–	–	o	xo	xo	5.70	q
7	Renaud Lavillenie	France	–	–	–	–	xxo	5.70	q
8	Anton Ivakin	Russia	–	–	o	o	xx–	5.60	q
8	Valentin Lavillenie	France	–	–	o	o	xxx	5.60	q
10	Didac Salas	Spain	–	o	xo	o	xxx	5.60	PB
11	Mareks Ārents	Latvia	–	o	o	xxo	xxx	5.60	=PB
12	Michal Balner	Czech Republic	–	–	o	xxx		5.45	
13	Carlo Paech	Germany	–	xo	o	xxx		5.45	
14	Per Magne Florvaag	Norway	o	o	xo	xxx		5.45	PB
15	Oleksandr Korchmid	Ukraine	–	o	xxx			5.25	
15	Robert Renner	Slovenia	o	o	xxx			5.25	
17	Eirik Greibrokk Dolve	Norway	xo	o	xxx			5.25	
18	Diogo Ferreira	Portugal	–	xo	xxx			5.25	
19	Kārlis Pujāts	Latvia	o	xxx				5.05	
20	Veiko Kriisk	Estonia	xo	xxx				5.05	
20	Ján Zmoray	Slovakia	xo	xxx				5.05	
	Edi Maia	Portugal	xxx					NM	
	Kévin Menaldo	France	–	–	xxx			NM	
	Mikkel Nielsen	Denmark	xxx					NM	

=== Final ===
Rank	Athlete	Nationality	5.45	5.55	5.65	5.75	5.80	5.85	5.90	5.95	6.04	6.17	Result	Note
1st place, gold medalist(s)	Renaud Lavillenie	France	–	–	–	o	–	–	o	–	xo	xxx	6.04	CR, WL
2nd place, silver medalist(s)	Aleksandr Gripich	Russia	xo	o	xo	o	x–	o	x–	xx			5.85	PB
3rd place, bronze medalist(s)	Piotr Lisek	Poland	o	–	xo	o	o	xo	xxx				5.85	
4	Robert Sobera	Poland	xo	–	xo	o	o	xx–	x				5.80	
5	Konstadinos Filippidis	Greece	xo	o	o	o	xxx						5.75	SB
6	Valentin Lavillenie	France	o	–	xo	xx–	x						5.65	
7	Anton Ivakin	Russia	x–	o	xo	x–	xx						5.65	
7	Jan Kudlička	Czech Republic	xo	–	xo	x–	xx						5.65	
9	Tobias Scherbarth	Germany	o	–	xxx								5.45	
