= Anton Ivakin =

Russian athlete, pole vaulter (born 1991)

Medal record

Men's athletics

Representing Russia

European U23 Championships
Gold medal – first place	2013 Tampere	Pole vault

World Junior Championships
Gold medal – first place	2010 Moncton	Pole vault

Anton Ivakin (born 3 February 1991) is a Russian athlete, pole vaulter.

With a personal best of 5.40 m (Cheboksary 3 July 2010), he is the new World Champion Junior in Moncton with a mark of 5.50 m (WJL), defeating Claudio Stecchi from Italy.

== Achievements ==
Year	Competition	Venue	Position	Notes
Representing Russia
2010	World Junior Championships	Moncton, Canada	1st	5.50 m
2011	European U23 Championships	Ostrava, Czech Republic	5th	5.50 m
2013	European Indoor Championships	Gothenburg, Swedish	-	NM
2013	European U23 Championships	Tampere, Finland	1st	5.60 m
2015	European Indoor Championships	Prague, Czech Republic	7th	5.65 m
