= Igor Bychkov (pole vaulter) =

Ukrainian-born pole vaulter

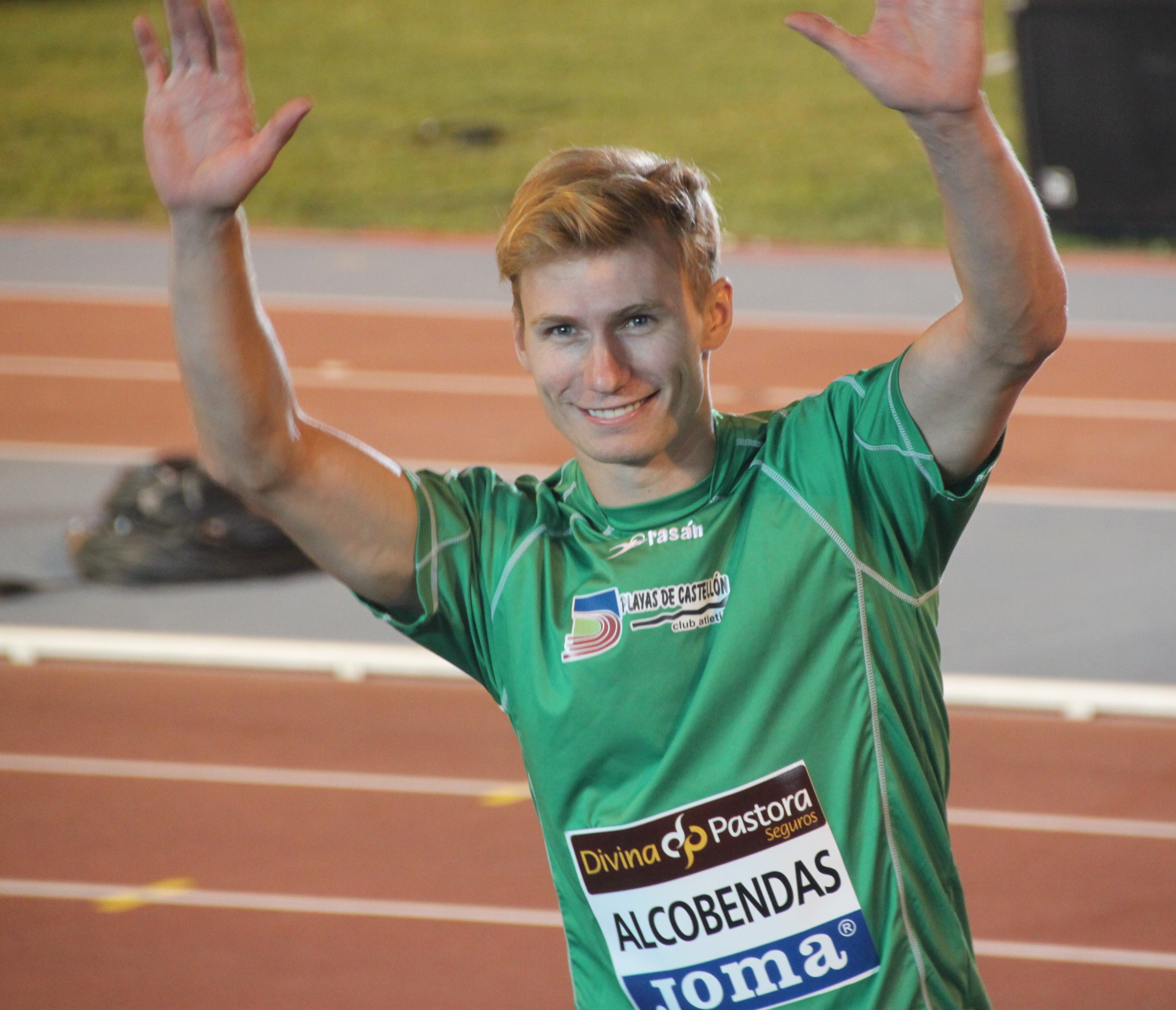

Personal information
- Nationality: Spain
- Born: 7 March 1987 (age 38) Donetsk, Ukrainian SSR
- Height: 1.89 m (6 ft 2 1/2 in)
- Weight: 80 kg (180 lb) (2012)

Sport
- Sport: Athletics
- Event: Pole vault
- Club: Playas de Castellon

Igor Bychkov (born 7 March 1987 in Donetsk, Ukrainian SSR) is a Ukrainian-born pole vaulter who represents Spain. He competed at the 2012 Summer Olympics in London, finishing 12th in the final. He was also the first Spanish athlete in the history to compete in a World Championships Final in the pole vault (Daegu 2011) and also the first Spanish athlete to win an IAAF Challenge in the pole vault after winning in Beijing 2013.

He has won three outdoor national championships (2011, 2012 and 2013), and two indoor national championships (2008 and 2011). He has represented Spain in nine major international competitions.

His personal best jumps are 5.65 metres outdoors (Alcobendas 2013) and 5.60 meters indoors (Madrid 2014).

== Competition record ==
Year	Competition	Venue	Position	Notes
Representing Spain
2010	Ibero-American Championships	San Fernando, Spain	4th	5.30 m
2010	European Championships	Barcelona, Spain	–	NM
2011	World Championships	Daegu, South Korea	12th (q)	5.50 m
2012	European Championships	Helsinki, Finland	10th (q)	5.50 m
2012	Olympic Games	London, United Kingdom	12th	5.50 m
2013	World Championships	Moscow, Russia	–	NM
2014	European Championships	Zürich, Switzerland	16th (q)	5.30 m
2017	World Championships	London, United Kingdom	–	NM
