= 2016 IAAF World Indoor Championships – Men's pole vault =

Men's pole vault at the 2016 IAAF World Indoor Championships
- Venue: Oregon Convention Center
- Dates: March 17
- Competitors: 14 from 9 nations
- Winning height: 6.02 m (19 ft 9 in)

Medalists
gold medal	Renaud Lavillenie	France
silver medal	Sam Kendricks	United States
bronze medal	Piotr Lisek	Poland

Video on YouTube Official Video

The men's pole vault at the 2016 IAAF World Indoor Championships took place on March 17, 2016.

The men's and women's pole vault competition were the only events on the opening day. They were conducted simultaneously with two parallel runways down the center of the arena. The runways were at floor level, unlike the more common raised runways which is a more dangerous situation; one which resulted in the injury to Renaud Lavillenie minutes after setting the world record two years earlier. It was that injury that prevented Lavillenie from defending his world indoor title at the previous championship, but he was back this year with the world leading jump going into the competition.

Of the 14 competitors, six had already left the competition before Lavillenie even bothered to make his first attempt at 5.75, 2 hours into the competition. All of the competitors in this field had cleared 5.75, most of them this season, but no other had the confidence to wait until 5.75 for their opening height. Piotr Lisek had already cleared the height, but he already had a miss earlier in the competition, so with his easy clearance, shrugging before landing in the pit, Lavillenie was immediately in the lead. Jan Kudlička and Shawn Barber struggled to clear on their third attempt. That would be the best those other jumpers would achieve. Sam Kendricks was still perfect in the competition to that point but had sat out 5.75. He remained perfect at 5.80 to take the lead while Lavillenie confidently passed and the others failed. Kendricks failed at his first attempt at 5.85, Barber and Lisek also saved one heroic attempt for 5.85, while Lavillenie remained on the sidelines. Kendricks then passed to 5.90 and failed again. Lavillenie then picked up his pole, almost 45 minutes after his first attempt and cleared the bar in only his second attempt of the evening. Kendricks took one final attempt to stay in the competition but had to settle for silver. Lavillenie continued, moving the bar to 6.02 he rattled the bar on his way down but it stayed on the pegs and he remained perfect in the competition. Lavillenie then had the bar raised another half a foot to world record height 6.17 m (20 ft 2 3/4 in), though none of the attempts were close.

== Records ==
Standing records prior to the 2016 IAAF World Indoor Championships
World record	Renaud Lavillenie (FRA)	6.16	Donetsk, Ukraine	15 February 2014
Championship record	Steven Hooker (AUS)	6.01	Doha, Qatar	13 March 2010
World Leading	Renaud Lavillenie (FRA)	6.03	Jablonec nad Nisou, Czech Republic	5 March 2016
African record	Okkert Brits (RSA)	5.90	Liévin, France	16 February 1997
African record	Okkert Brits (RSA)	5.90	Toronto, Canada	1 June 1997
Asian record	Igor Potapovich (KAZ)	5.92	Stockholm, Sweden	19 February 1998
European record	Renaud Lavillenie (FRA)	6.16	Donetsk, Ukraine	15 February 2014
North and Central American and Caribbean record	Jeff Hartwig (USA)	6.02	Sindelfingen, Germany	10 March 2002
Oceanian Record	Steven Hooker (AUS)	6.06	Boston, United States	7 February 2009
South American record	Thiago Braz (BRA)	5.93	Berlin, Germany	13 February 2016

== Qualification standards ==
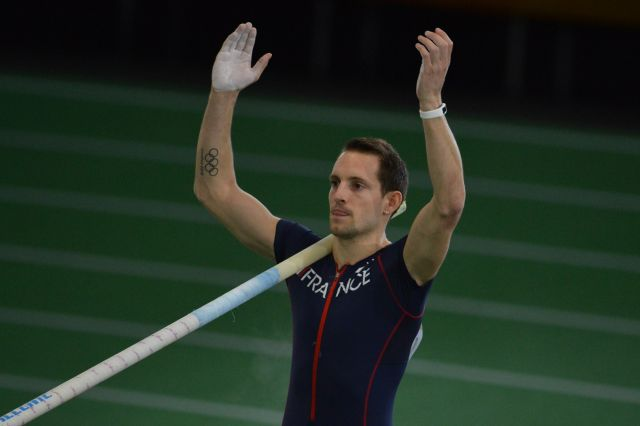
Renaud Lavillenie during competition

Indoor	Outdoor
5.77

== Schedule ==
Date	Time	Round
17 March 2016	19:05	Final

== Results ==
The final was started at 19:05.

Rank	Name	Nationality	5.40	5.55	5.65	5.75	5.80	5.85	5.90	6.02	6.17	Result	Notes
1st place, gold medalist(s)	Renaud Lavillenie	France	–	–	–	o	–	–	o	o	xxx	6.02	CR
2nd place, silver medalist(s)	Sam Kendricks	United States	o	o	o	–	o	x–	xx			5.80	
3rd place, bronze medalist(s)	Piotr Lisek	Poland	–	o	xo	o	xx–	x				5.75	
4	Jan Kudlička	Czech Republic	o	–	xxo	xxo	xxx					5.75	
4	Shawnacy Barber	Canada	–	o	xxo	xxo	xx–	x				5.75	
6	Robert Sobera	Poland	o	–	o	xxx						5.65	
7	Konstantinos Filippidis	Greece	xo	o	xo	xxx						5.65	
8	Mike Arnold	United States	o	xxo	xxo	xxx						5.65	
9	Michal Balner	Czech Republic	o	o	xxx							5.55	
10	Seito Yamamoto	Japan	xo	o	xxx							5.55	
10	Carlo Paech	Germany	xo	o	xxx							5.55	
12	Jérôme Clavier	France	o	xo	xxx							5.55	
12	Thiago Braz da Silva	Brazil	–	xo	–	xx–	x					5.55	
14	Augusto Dutra de Oliveira	Brazil	xo	xxx								5.40	
