= Jan Kudlička =

Czech pole vaulter (born 1988)

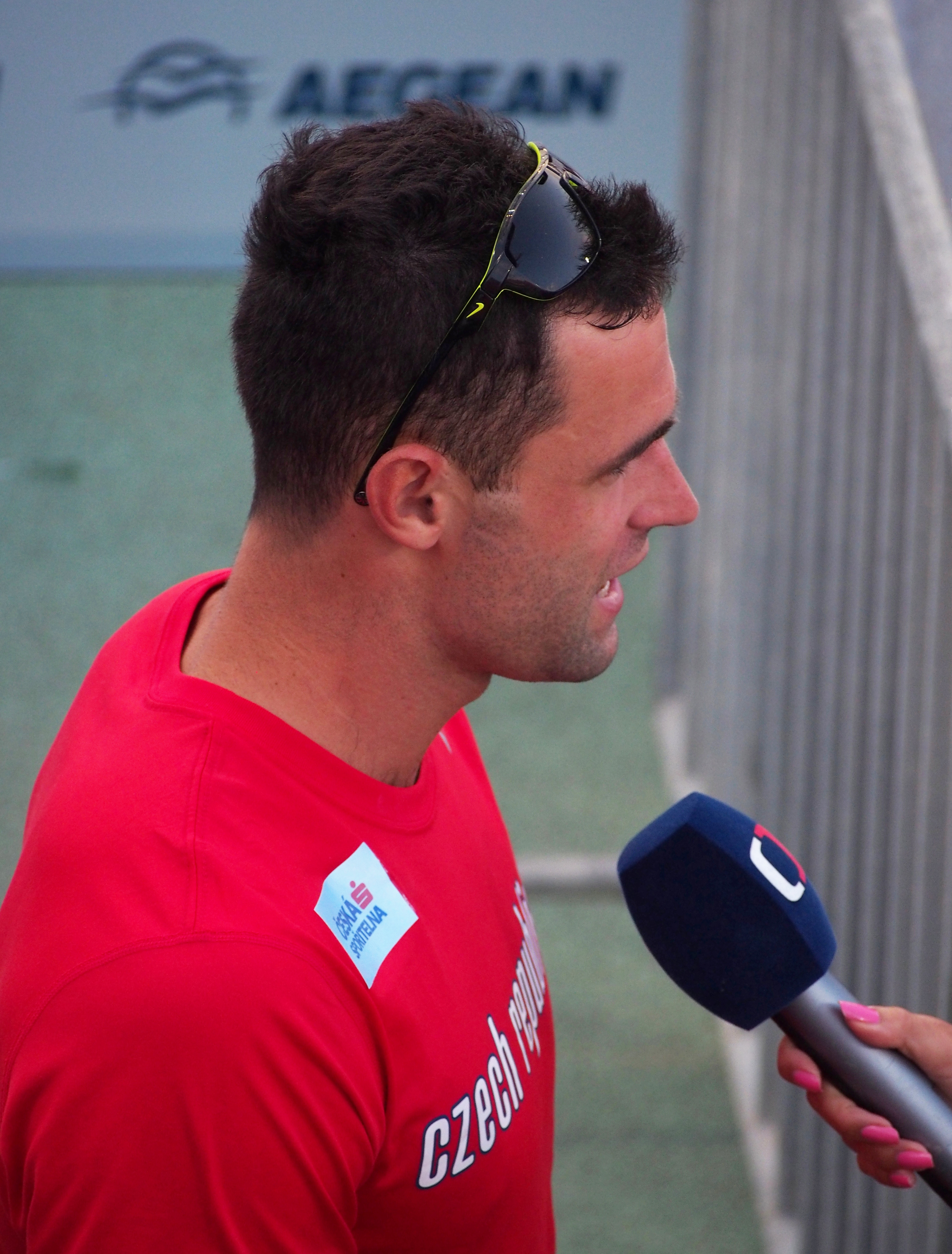
- Kudlička after the end of pole vault event of at 2015 European Team Championships First League

Personal information
- Born: 29 April 1988 (age 38) Opava, Czechoslovakia
- Height: 1.84 m (6 ft 1/2 in)
- Weight: 80 kg (176 lb)

Sport
- Country: Czech Republic
- Sport: Athletics
- Event: Pole Vault
Medal record
Men's athletics
Representing Czech Republic
World Indoor Championships
Bronze medal – third place	2014 Sopot	Pole vault
European Championships
Silver medal – second place	2016 Amsterdam	Pole vault
Bronze medal – third place	2014 Zurich	Pole vault

Jan Kudlička (Czech pronunciation: [ˈjan ˈkudlɪtʃka]; born 29 April 1988) is a Czech former pole vaulter. He finished in 8th place at the 2012 Summer Olympics in London with a jump of 5.65 metres.

== Competition record ==
Year	Competition	Venue	Position	Notes
Representing the Czech Republic
2005	World Youth Championships	Marrakesh, Morocco	6th	5.05 m
2006	World Junior Championships	Beijing, China	5th	5.30 m
2008	Olympic Games	Beijing, China	10th	5.45 m
2009	European U23 Championships	Kaunas, Lithuania	8th	5.15 m
2009	World Championships	Berlin, Germany	22nd (q)	5.40 m
2010	European Championships	Barcelona, Spain	10th	5.60 m
2011	World Championships	Daegu, South Korea	9th	5.65 m
2012	European Championships	Helsinki, Finland	6th	5.60 m
2012	Olympic Games	London, United Kingdom	8th	5.65 m
2013	European Indoor Championships	Gothenburg, Sweden	5th	5.71 m
2013	World Championships	Moscow, Russia	7th	5.75 m
2014	World Indoor Championships	Sopot, Poland	3rd	5.80 m
2014	European Championships	Zurich, Switzerland	3rd	5.70 m
2015	European Indoor Championships	Prague, Czech Republic	7th	5.65 m
2015	World Championships	Beijing, China	13th	5.50 m
2016	World Indoor Championships	Portland, United States	4th	5.75 m
2016	European Championships	Amsterdam, Netherlands	2nd	5.60 m
2016	Olympic Games	Rio de Janeiro, Brazil	4th	5.75 m
2017	European Indoor Championships	Belgrade, Serbia	4th	5.80 m
2017	World Championships	London, United Kingdom	18th (q)	5.45 m
2018	European Championships	Berlin, Germany	25th (q)	5.36 m
