= Athletics at the 2015 Summer Universiade – Men's pole vault =

The men's pole vault event at the 2015 Summer Universiade was held on 9 and 11 July at the Gwangju Universiade Main Stadium.

== Medalists ==
Gold	Silver	Bronze
Nikita Filippov; Kazakhstan	Ilya Mudrov; Russia	Robert Sobera; Poland

== Results ==
=== Qualification ===
Qualification: 5.30 m (Q) or at least 12 best (q) qualified for the final.

Rank	Group	Athlete	Nationality	4.80	5.00	5.10	5.20	5.30	Result	Notes
1	B	Marvin Caspari	Germany	–	–	–	o	o	5.30	Q
1	B	Alexandre Feger	France	–	–	–	o	o	5.30	Q
1	B	Nikita Filippov	Kazakhstan	–	–	–	o	o	5.30	Q
1	B	Jin Min-sub	South Korea	–	–	–	o	o	5.30	Q
1	B	Robert Sobera	Poland	–	–	–	–	o	5.30	Q
6	A	Daniel Clemens	Germany	–	–	–	xo	o	5.30	Q
6	A	Noël Ost	France	–	xo	o	o	o	5.30	Q
6	A	Michael Woepse	United States	–	–	–	xo	o	5.30	Q
9	B	Sergey Grigoryev	Kazakhstan	–	o	–	xxo	o	5.30	Q
9	A	Leonid Kivalov	Russia	–	–	–	o	xo	5.30	Q
9	A	Ilya Mudrov	Russia	–	–	–	o	xo	5.30	Q
11	A	Diogo Ferreira	Portugal	–	o	o	o	xxx	5.20	q
11	A	Nicholas Southgate	New Zealand	–	o	–	o	xxx	5.20	q
11	B	Han Du-hyeon	South Korea	–	–	o	o	xxx	5.20	q
14	B	Simon Assarsson	Sweden	xo	o	o	xo	xxx	5.20	SB
15	B	Adam Pašiak	Czech Republic	–	o	–	xxx		5.00	
15	B	Daniel Zupeuc	Chile	o	o	xxx			5.00	
16	A	Angus Armstrong	Australia	o	xxx				4.80	
	A	Pedro Figueroa	El Salvador	xxx					NM	
	A	Mark Sakioka	United States	xxx					NM	

=== Final ===
Official Video

Rank	Athlete	Nationality	5.00	5.15	5.30	5.40	5.50	5.60	5.65	Result	Notes
1st place, gold medalist(s)	Nikita Filippov	Kazakhstan	–	–	xxo	–	o	xx–	x	5.50	
2nd place, silver medalist(s)	Ilya Mudrov	Russia	–	–	–	xo	xo	xxx		5.50	
3rd place, bronze medalist(s)	Robert Sobera	Poland	–	–	o	–	xxo	xxx		5.50	
4	Noël Ost	France	–	o	xxo	xo	xxx			5.40	
5	Han Du-hyeon	South Korea	–	o	o	xxx				5.30	
5	Jin Min-sub	South Korea	–	–	o	xxx				5.30	
7	Daniel Clemens	Germany	–	o	xo	xxx				5.30	
7	Alexandre Feger	France	–	–	xo	xxx				5.30	
9	Sergey Grigoryev	Kazakhstan	–	xxo	–	xxx				5.15	
9	Michael Woepse	United States	–	xxo	–	xxx				5.15	
	Marvin Caspari	Germany	–	xxx						NM	
	Leonid Kivalov	Russia	–	–	xxx					NM	
	Diogo Ferreira	Portugal	–	xxx						NM	
	Nicholas Southgate	New Zealand								DNS	
