= Mareks Ārents =

Latvian pole vaulter (born 1986)

Personal information
- Nationality: Latvian
- Born: 5 August 1986 (age 39) Riga, Latvian SSR, Soviet Union
- Height: 1.89 m (6 ft 2 in)
- Weight: 78 kg (172 lb)

Sport
- Country: Latvia
- Sport: Track and field
- Event: Pole vault
- Coached by: Igors Izotovs, Marita Ārente, Maigonis Pūliņš

Achievements and titles
- Personal best: 5.70 m (2016)

Mareks Ārents (born 6 August 1986) is a Latvian former track and field athlete who specialised in the pole vault. He won the Latvian outdoor national championship 12 times and the national indoor title nine times. He represented Latvia at multiple major championships, including the 2012 and 2016 Olympic Games. He later acted as coach to his compatriot, and 2024 Olympian, Valters Kreišs.

== Athletics career ==
He qualified for 2012 Summer Olympics in London, but did not reach the final, making a best jump of 5.35 metres.

At the 2013 European Indoor Championships in Gothenburg, Sweden, he jumped 5.50 m, ranking him in 11th place, missing the final by 10 cm. He went on to compete at the 2013 World Athletics Championships in Moscow, but his 5.25 best clearance did not qualify him for the final.

He competed at the 2015 World Championships in Beijing, China where he cleared 5.55 metres.

He cleared 5.50 metres to place sixth overall at the 2016 European Athletics Championships in Amsterdam, Netherlands, on countback, despite having cleared the same height as the bronze medal winner Robert Renner of Slovenia. He subsequently competed the 2016 Olympic Games in Rio de Janeiro where he cleared 5.45 metres but did not progress to the final.

He placed joint-eighth overall at the 2017 European Indoor Championships in Belgrade, Serbia with a best height of 5.60 metres.

== Post-athletics career ==
After the conclusion of his athletics career he coached his younger compatriot Valters Kreišs who made his debut at the Olympics at the 2024 Summer Olympics in Paris.

== Competition record ==
Year	Competition	Venue	Position	Notes
Representing Latvia
2012	Olympic Games	London, United Kingdom	22nd (q)	5.35 m
2013	European Indoor Championships	Gothenburg, Sweden	11th (q)	5.50 m
2013	Universiade	Kazan, Russia	8th	5.30 m
2013	World Championships	Moscow, Russia	33rd (q)	5.25 m
2014	European Championships	Zürich, Switzerland	–	NM
2015	European Indoor Championships	Prague, Czech Republic	11th (q)	5.60 m
2015	World Championships	Beijing, China	25th (q)	5.55 m
2016	European Championships	Amsterdam, Netherlands	6th	5.50 m
2016	Olympic Games	Rio de Janeiro, Brazil	16th (q)	5.45 m
2017	European Indoor Championships	Belgrade, Serbia	8th	5.60 m
2018	European Championships	Berlin, Germany	22nd (q)	5.36 m
