= Edi Maia =

Portuguese pole vaulter

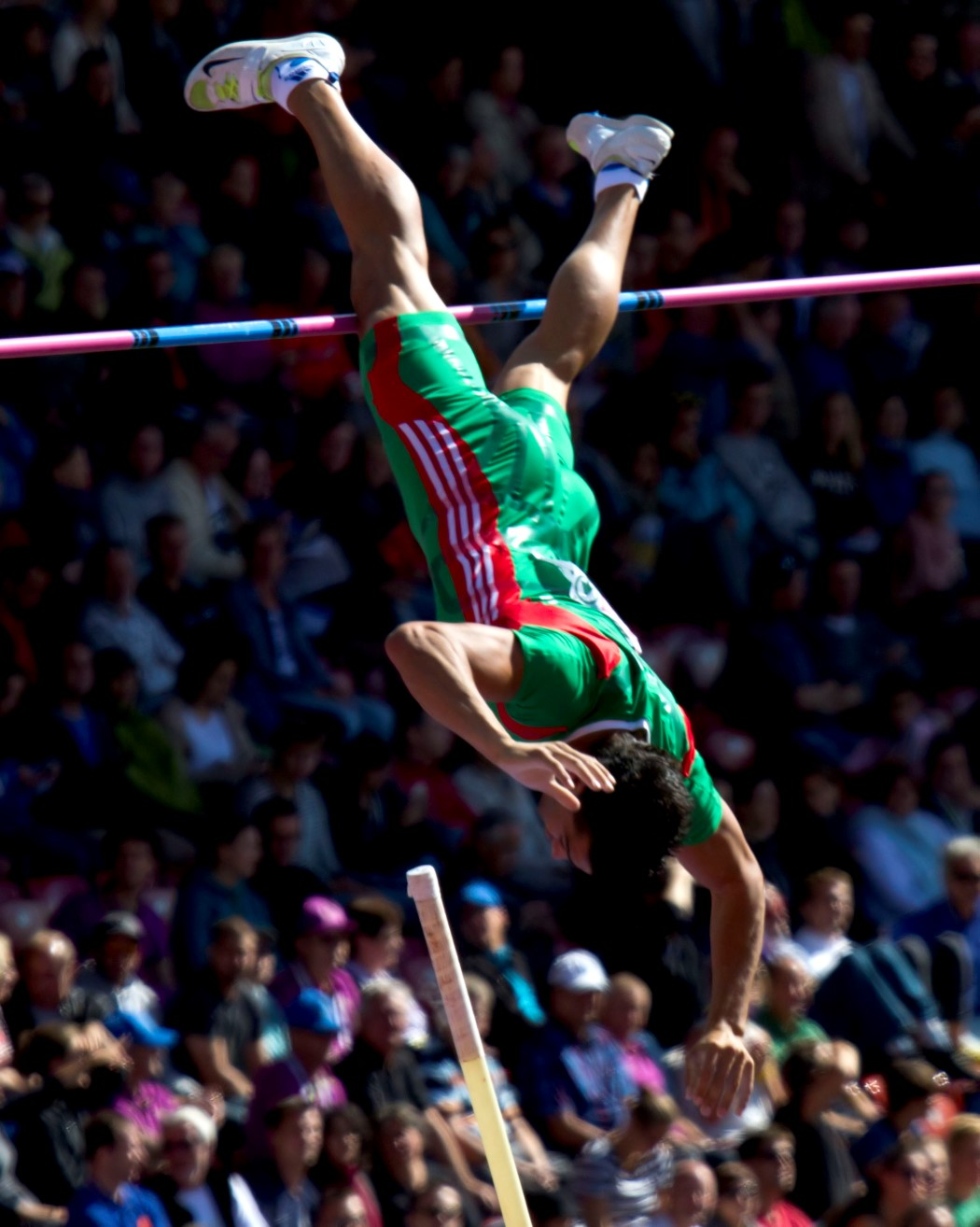
990312 polsstok maia (15009352335).jpg

Edi Maia (born 10 November 1987 in Setúbal) is a Portuguese pole vaulter. He competed in the pole vault event at the 2012 Summer Olympics.

His outdoor personal best in the event is 5.70 metres achieved in Lisbon in 2013, which is the Portuguese record. His indoor best of 5.70 metres, achieved in Orléans in 2014, is also a current national record.

== Competition record ==
Year	Competition	Venue	Position	Notes
Representing Portugal
2009	European U23 Championships	Kaunas, Lithuania	15th (q)	5.20 m
2010	Ibero-American Championships	San Fernando, Spain	3rd	5.30 m
2010	European Championships	Barcelona, Spain	26th (q)	5.10 m
2011	European Indoor Championships	Paris, France	16th (q)	5.20 m
2011	World Championships	Daegu, South Korea	–	NM
2012	European Championships	Helsinki, Finland	–	NM
2012	Olympic Games	London, United Kingdom	24th (q)	5.20 m
2013	European Indoor Championships	Gothenburg, Sweden	22nd (q)	5.20 m
2013	World Championships	Moscow, Russia	24th (q)	5.40 m
2014	European Championships	Zürich, Switzerland	8th	5.60 m
2015	European Indoor Championships	Prague, Czech Republic	–	NM
