= Carlo Paech =

German pole vaulter (born 1992)

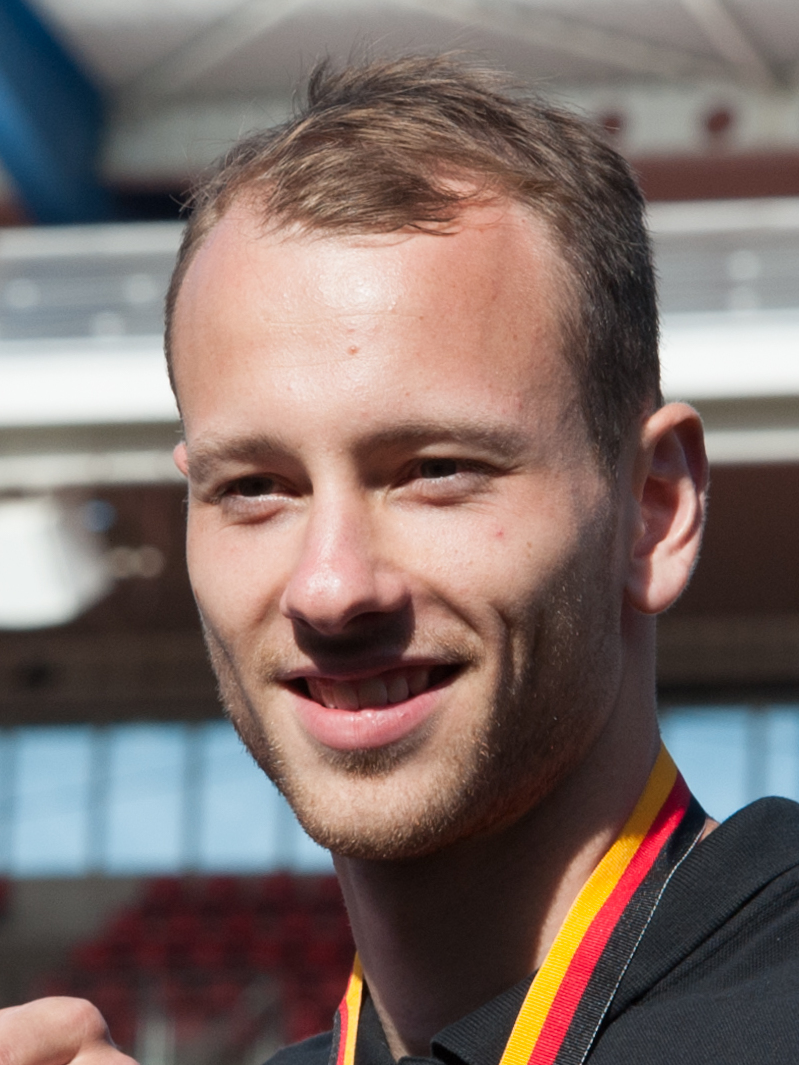
- Paech at the 2015 German Championships

Personal information
- Nationality: German
- Born: 18 December 1992 (age 33) Berlin, Germany
- Height: 1.90 m (6 ft 3 in)

Sport
- Country: Germany
- Sport: Track and field
- Event: Pole vault
- Club: TSV Bayer 04 Leverkusen
- Coached by: Michael Kühnke; Jörn Elberding

Carlo Paech (born 18 December 1992) is a German athlete who specialises in the pole vault. He competed at the 2015 World Championships in Beijing narrowly missing the final. His personal bests are 5.80 metres outdoors (Zweibrücken 2015) and 5.67 metres indoors (Zürich 2015).

== Competition record ==
Year	Competition	Venue	Position	Notes
Representing Germany
2009	World Youth Championships	Brixen, Italy	2nd	5.10 m
2011	European Junior Championships	Tallinn, Estonia	7th	5.10 m
2013	European U23 Championships	Tampere, Finland	5th (q)	5.35 m (Note: No mark in the final)
2015	European Indoor Championships	Prague, Czech Republic	13th (q)	5.45 m
2015	World Championships	Beijing, China	17th (q)	5.65 m
2016	World Indoor Championships	Portland, United States	10th	5.55 m
