= 2012 European Athletics Championships – Men's pole vault =

Men's pole vault at the European Athletics Championships

The men's pole vault at the 2012 European Athletics Championships was held at the Helsinki Olympic Stadium on 30 June and 1 July.

== Medalists ==
| Gold | Renaud Lavillenie; France |
| Silver | Björn Otto; Germany |
| Bronze | Raphael Holzdeppe; Germany |

== Records ==
Standing records prior to the 2012 European Athletics Championships
| World record | Sergey Bubka (UKR) | 6.14 | Sestriere, Italy | 31 July 1994 |
| European record | Sergey Bubka (UKR) | 6.14 | Sestriere, Italy | 31 July 1994 |
| Championship record | Rodion Gataullin (RUS) | 6.00 | Helsinki, Finland | 11 August 1994 |
| World Leading | Malte Mohr (GER) | 5.91 | Ingolstadt, Germany | 22 June 2012 |
| European Leading | Malte Mohr (GER) | 5.91 | Ingolstadt, Germany | 22 June 2012 |
Broken records during the 2012 European Athletics Championships
| World and European Leading | Renaud Lavillenie (FRA) | 5.97 | Helsinki, Finland | 1 July 2012 |

== Schedule ==
| Date | Time | Round |
|---|---|---|
| 30 June 2012 | 13:15 | Qualification |
| 1 July 2012 | 16:15 | Final |

== Results ==
=== Qualification ===
Qualification: Qualification Performance 5.60 (Q) or at least 12 best performers advance to the final

| Rank | Group | Athlete | Nationality | 5.10 | 5.30 | 5.40 | 5.50 | 5.55 | Result | Notes |
|---|---|---|---|---|---|---|---|---|---|---|
| 1 | A | Renaud Lavillenie | France | – | – | – | – | o | 5.55 | |
| 2 | B | Maksym Mazuryk | Ukraine | – | – | xxo | – | o | 5.55 | |
| 3 | A | Claudio Stecchi | Italy | – | xo | – | xo | xo | 5.55 | |
| 4 | A | Björn Otto | Germany | – | – | – | o | – | 5.50 | |
| 4 | B | Raphael Holzdeppe | Germany | – | – | – | o | – | 5.50 | |
| 4 | B | Jan Kudlička | Czech Republic | – | o | – | o | – | 5.50 | |
| 7 | A | Konstadinos Filippidis | Greece | – | xxo | – | o | – | 5.50 | |
| 8 | B | Rasmus Jørgensen | Denmark | o | o | o | xo | x– | 5.50 | =PB |
| 8 | B | Sergey Kucheryanu | Russia | – | o | – | xo | – | 5.50 | |
| 10 | B | Igor Bychkov | Spain | o | xo | – | xo | xx– | 5.50 | |
| 11 | B | Malte Mohr | Germany | – | – | – | xxo | – | 5.50 | |
| 12 | B | Jérôme Clavier | France | – | o | – | xxx | | 5.30 | |
| 12 | A | Stanislau Tsivonchyk | Belarus | – | o | xxx | | | 5.30 | |
| 14 | A | Max Eaves | Great Britain | xo | o | – | xxx | | 5.30 | |
| 14 | A | Dídac Salas | Spain | xo | o | xxx | | | 5.30 | |
| 16 | B | Eemeli Salomäki | Finland | – | xo | – | xxx | | 5.30 | |
| 16 | A | Andrew Sutcliffe | Great Britain | o | xo | xxx | | | 5.30 | |
| 18 | A | Jere Bergius | Finland | – | xxo | – | – | xxx | 5.30 | |
| 18 | A | Robbert-Jan Jansen | Netherlands | – | xxo | xxx | | | 5.30 | |
| 20 | B | Luke Cutts | Great Britain | o | xxx | | | | 5.10 | |
| | B | Marco Boni | Italy | xxx | | | | | NM | |
| | B | Przemysław Czerwiński | Poland | – | xxx | | | | NM | |
| | A | Alhaji Jeng | Sweden | – | – | – | xx– | x | NM | |
| | B | Edi Maia | Portugal | xxx | | | | | NM | |
| | A | Romain Mesnil | France | – | – | – | – | xxx | NM | |
| | A | Pauls Pujāts | Latvia | xxx | | | | | NM | |
| | B | Nikandros Stylianou | Cyprus | xxx | | | | | NM | |
| | A | Denys Yurchenko | Ukraine | – | – | xxx | | | NM | |

=== Final ===
| Rank | Athlete | Nationality | 5.40 | 5.50 | 5.60 | 5.66 | 5.72 | 5.77 | 5.82 | 5.87 | 5.92 | 5.97 | 6.02 | Result | Notes |
|---|---|---|---|---|---|---|---|---|---|---|---|---|---|---|---|
| 1st place, gold medalist(s) | Renaud Lavillenie | France | – | – | xo | – | – | o | xxo | o | o | o | xxx | 5.97 | WL |
| 2nd place, silver medalist(s) | Björn Otto | Germany | – | o | – | o | – | xxo | xxo | – | xo | – | xxx | 5.92 | PB |
| 3rd place, bronze medalist(s) | Raphael Holzdeppe | Germany | – | o | – | – | o | o | xxx | | | | | 5.77 | =SB |
| 4 | Malte Mohr | Germany | – | – | o | – | – | xo | xxx | | | | | 5.77 | |
| 5 | Konstadinos Filippidis | Greece | – | o | – | o | xo | xxx | | | | | | 5.72 | SB |
| 6 | Jan Kudlička | Czech Republic | o | – | o | – | xx– | x | | | | | | 5.60 | |
| 7 | Rasmus Wejnold Jørgensen | Denmark | xxo | xxo | xxx | | | | | | | | | 5.50 | =PB |
| 8 | Maksym Mazuryk | Ukraine | xo | – | xxx | | | | | | | | | 5.40 | |
| 8 | Claudio Stecchi | Italy | xo | xxx | | | | | | | | | | 5.40 | |
| 10 | Jérôme Clavier | France | xxo | – | xxx | | | | | | | | | 5.40 | |
| | Igor Bychkov | Spain | xxx | | | | | | | | | | | NM | |
| | Sergey Kucheryanu | Russia | xxx | | | | | | | | | | | NM | |
| | Stanislau Tsivonchyk | Belarus | xxx | | | | | | | | | | | NM | |
