= 2010 World Junior Championships in Athletics – Men's pole vault =

The men's pole vault event at the 2010 World Junior Championships in Athletics was held in Moncton, New Brunswick, Canada, at Moncton Stadium on 20 and 22 July.

== Medalists ==
| Gold | Anton Ivakin; Russia |
| Silver | Claudio Stecchi; Italy |
| Bronze | Andrew Sutcliffe; United Kingdom |

== Results ==
=== Final ===
22 July

| Rank | Name | Nationality | Result | Notes |
|---|---|---|---|---|
| 1st place, gold medalist(s) | Anton Ivakin | Russia | 5.50 | |
| 2nd place, silver medalist(s) | Claudio Stecchi | Italy | 5.40 | |
| 3rd place, bronze medalist(s) | Andrew Sutcliffe | United Kingdom | 5.35 | |
| 4 | Robert Sobera | Poland | 5.30 | |
| 5 | Tom Konrad | Germany | 5.20 | |
| 6 | Pauls Pujats | Latvia | 5.10 | |
| 7 | Vitaliy Tsepilov | Ukraine | 5.00 | |
| 7 | Kyle Ballew | United States | 5.00 | |
| 9 | Matthew Devereux | United Kingdom | 5.00 | |
| 10 | Marquis Richards | Switzerland | 5.00 | |
| 11 | Nikita Filippov | Kazakhstan | 4.85 | |
| | Didac Salas | Spain | NH | |
| | Pascal Koehl | Germany | NH | |
| | Richard Lysov | Russia | NH | |

=== Qualifications ===
20 July

==== Group A ====
| Rank | Name | Nationality | Result | Notes |
|---|---|---|---|---|
| 1 | Tom Konrad | Germany | 5.15 | q |
| 1 | Robert Sobera | Poland | 5.15 | q |
| 3 | Claudio Stecchi | Italy | 5.15 | q |
| 4 | Richard Lysov | Russia | 5.05 | q |
| 4 | Vitaliy Tsepilov | Ukraine | 5.05 | q |
| 4 | Kyle Ballew | United States | 5.05 | q |
| 7 | Matthew Devereux | United Kingdom | 5.05 | q |
| 7 | Nikita Filippov | Kazakhstan | 5.05 | q |
| 9 | Jin Min-Sub | South Korea | 4.95 | |
| 10 | Lane Britnell | Canada | 4.75 | |

==== Group B ====
| Rank | Name | Nationality | Result | Notes |
|---|---|---|---|---|
| 1 | Anton Ivakin | Russia | 5.15 | q |
| 2 | Marquis Richards | Switzerland | 5.15 | q |
| 3 | Andrew Sutcliffe | United Kingdom | 5.15 | q |
| 4 | Pauls Pujats | Latvia | 5.15 | q |
| 5 | Didac Salas | Spain | 5.05 | q |
| 6 | Pascal Koehl | Germany | 5.05 | q |
| 7 | Yun Dae-Uk | South Korea | 5.05 | |
| 8 | Mark Thomas | United States | 4.95 | |
| 9 | Baptiste Boirie | France | 4.75 | |
| 9 | Marcello Palazzo | Italy | 4.75 | |
| | Tymur Skorykh | Ukraine | NH | |

== Participation ==
According to an unofficial count, 21 athletes from 14 countries participated in the event.

- Canada (1)
- France (1)
- Germany (2)
- Italy (2)
- Kazakhstan (1)
- Latvia (1)
- Poland (1)
- Russia (2)
- South Korea (2)
- Spain (1)
- Switzerland (1)
- Ukraine (2)
- United Kingdom (2)
- United States (2)
