= Melker Svärd Jacobsson =

Swedish pole vaulter

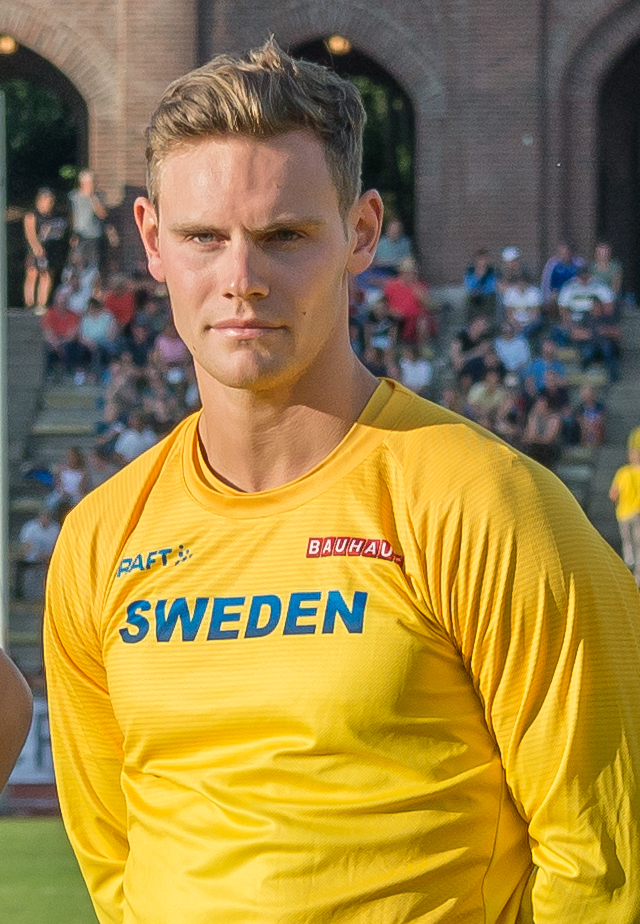
- Jacobsson in 2019

Personal information
- Born: January 8, 1994 (age 32)
- Height: 1.88 m (6 ft 2 in)
- Weight: 79 kg (174 lb)

Sport
- Country: Sweden
- Sport: Track and field
- Event: Pole vault
Medal record
European Indoor Championships
Bronze medal – third place	2019 Glasgow	Pole vault

Melker Svärd Jacobsson (born 8 January 1994) is a Swedish pole vaulter.

== Athletics career ==
At the 2010 Summer Youth Olympics held in Singapore, Jacobsson placed joint fourth in the final of the boys' pole vault with a jump of 4.85 metres.

He won the silver medal at the 2011 World Youth Championships in Athletics and finished sixth at the 2012 World Junior Championships in Athletics. In 2014 he finished 19th in the men's pole vault at the European Athletics Championships with a jump of 5.30 metres.

Jacobsson set an indoor personal best jump of 5.65 metres, at an event in Potsdam in February 2014. In autumn 2014 Jacobsson underwent surgery on both his hips to correct an issue that had caused him pain since the age of ten. After four months of recovery he suffered a groin injury that resulted in pain when he jumped, which doctors were unable to diagnose for eight months. In January 2015 German surgeon Hans-Wilhelm Müller-Wohlfahrt, who had previously operated on other athletes including Usain Bolt, Sanna Kallur and Christian Olsson, as well as U2 singer Bono, identified the issue and carried out a second surgery. During his recovery period Jacobsson caught glandular fever. He eventually returned to training in December 2015 under a new coach, Gustaf Hultgren.

Jacobsson was one of the first four track and field athletes to qualify to compete for Sweden at the 2016 Summer Olympics, having met the qualifying standard of 5.70 metres for the men's pole vault. He met the standard by setting a new personal best of exactly 5.70 metres at an event in Austin, Texas, United States. He has also surpassed the qualification standard of 5.55 metres needed to compete at the 2016 European Athletics Championships due to be held in Amsterdam, Netherlands. He reached the final there but did not start in it. In the end, he was also withdrawn from the Rio squad due to an injury.

== Competition record ==
Year	Competition	Venue	Position	Notes
Representing Sweden
2010	Youth Olympic Games	Singapore	4th	4.85 m
2011	World Youth Championships	Lille, France	2nd	5.15 m
2012	World Junior Championships	Barcelona, Spain	6th	5.35 m
2013	European Indoor Championships	Gothenburg, Sweden	14th (q)	5.50 m
2014	European Championships	Zürich, Switzerland	19th (q)	5.30 m
2016	European Championships	Amsterdam, Netherlands	9th (q)	5.50 m^{1}
2018	World Indoor Championships	Birmingham, United Kingdom	9th	5.70 m
2018	European Championships	Berlin, Germany	–	NM
2019	European Indoor Championships	Glasgow, United Kingdom	3rd	5.75 m

^{1}Did not start in the final
