= Stanley Joseph =

French pole vaulter (born 1991)

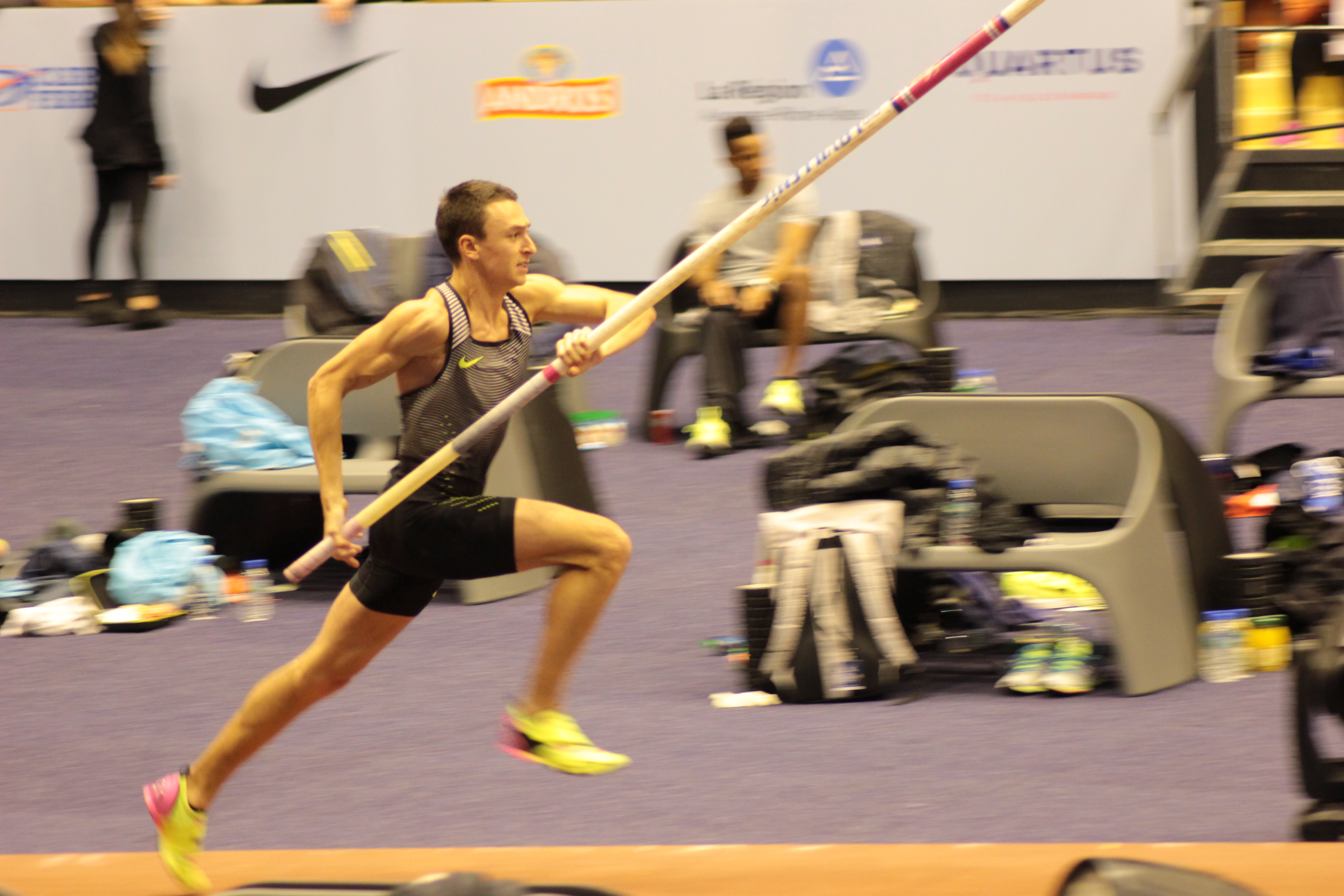

Personal information
- Born: 24 October 1991 (age 34) Orléans, France
- Height: 1.81 m (5 ft 11 in)
- Weight: 71 kg (157 lb)

Sport
- Sport: Athletics
- Event: Pole vault
- Club: EC Orléans Cercle Jules Ferry; Lille Métropole Athlétisme
- Coached by: Philippe d'Encausse; Mathieu Boisrond

Stanley Joseph (born 24 October 1991) is a French athlete specialising in the pole vault. He represented his country at the 2016 Summer Olympics without qualifying for the final.

His personal bests in the event are 5.75 metres outdoors (Angers 2016) and 5.64 metres indoors (Jablonec nad Nisou 2016).

== International competitions ==
| Year | Competition | Venue | Position | Notes |
Representing France
| 2013 | European Indoor Championships | Prague, Czech Republic | 15th (q) | 5.50 m |
| 2013 | European U23 Championships | Tampere, Finland | 6th | 5.40 m |
| 2016 | European Championships | Amsterdam, Netherlands | 13th | 5.30 m |
| 2016 | Olympic Games | Rio de Janeiro, Brazil | 16th (q) | 5.45 m |
| 2017 | European Indoor Championships | Belgrade, Serbia | 8th | 5.60 m |
| 2017 | Jeux de la Francophonie | Abidjan, Ivory Coast | 2nd | 5.40 m |
