= 2014 European Athletics Championships – Men's pole vault =

Men's pole vault at the European Athletics Championships

The men's pole vault at the 2014 European Athletics Championships took place at the Letzigrund on 14 and 16 August.

== Medalists ==
Gold	Renaud Lavillenie; France
Silver	Paweł Wojciechowski; Poland
Bronze	Jan Kudlička; Czech Republic
Bronze	Kévin Menaldo; France

== Records ==
Standing records prior to the 2014 European Athletics Championships
World record	Renaud Lavillenie (FRA)	6.16	Donetsk, Ukraine	15 February 2014
European record	Renaud Lavillenie (FRA)	6.16	Donetsk, Ukraine	15 February 2014
Championship record	Rodion Gataullin (RUS)	6.00	Helsinki, Finland	11 August 1994
World Leading	Renaud Lavillenie (FRA)	5.92	Shanghai, China	18 May 2014
European Leading	Renaud Lavillenie (FRA)	5.92	Shanghai, China	18 May 2014

== Schedule ==
Date	Time	Round
14 August 2014	10:15	Qualification
16 August 2014	15:00	Final

== Results ==
=== Qualification ===
Qualification: Qualification Performance 5.65 (Q) or at least 12 best performers advance to the final

Rank	Group	Athlete	Nationality	5.30	5.40	5.50	5.60	Result	Notes
1	A	Renaud Lavillenie	France	–	–	–	xo	5.60	q
2	B	Jan Kudlička	Czech Republic	–	o	–	xxo	5.60	q
3	B	Steven Lewis	Great Britain	–	o	o	–	5.50	q
3	B	Kévin Menaldo	France	o	–	o	–	5.50	q
3	B	Ilya Mudrov	Russia	–	–	o	–	5.50	q
3	B	Robert Sobera	Poland	o	–	o	–	5.50	q
7	A	Karsten Dilla	Germany	o	xo	o	–	5.50	q
7	A	Aleksandr Gripich	Russia	o	xo	o	–	5.50	q
9	A	Konstadinos Filippidis	Greece	xo	xo	o	–	5.50	q
10	B	Sergey Kucheryanu	Russia	xo	–	xo	–	5.50	q
11	A	Diogo Ferreira	Portugal	xxo	o	xo	–	5.50	q
12	B	Piotr Lisek	Poland	o	–	xxo	–	5.50	q
12	A	Paweł Wojciechowski	Poland	o	–	xxo	–	5.50	q
14	B	Edi Maia	Portugal	xo	xo	xxo	–	5.50	q
15	B	Marquis Richards	Switzerland	xo	o	xxx		5.40	
16	B	Arnaud Art	Belgium	o	–	xxx		5.30	
16	B	Igor Bychkov	Spain	o	–	xxx		5.30	
16	B	Dimitrios Patsoukakis	Greece	o	xxx			5.30	
19	A	Melker Svärd-Jacobsson	Sweden	xo	xxx			5.30	
20	A	Michal Balner	Czech Republic	xxo	–	xxx		5.30	
20	A	Luke Cutts	Great Britain	xxo	xxx			5.30	
	B	Mareks Ārents	Latvia	–	x–	r		NM	
	A	Giuseppe Gibilisco	Italy	–	xxx			NM	
	A	Pauls Pujāts	Latvia	xxx				NM	
	A	Dídac Salas	Spain	xxx				NM	
	A	Tobias Scherbarth	Germany	–	xxx			NM	
	A	Nikandros Stylianou	Cyprus	xxx				NM	
	B	Alhaji Jeng	Sweden					DNS	
	B	Malte Mohr	Germany					DNS	

=== Final ===
Rank	Athlete	Nationality	5.40	5.50	5.60	5.65	5.70	5.75	5.80	5.85	5.90	5.95	6.01	Result	Notes
1st place, gold medalist(s)	Renaud Lavillenie	France	–	–	–	o	–	–	o	–	xo	–	xxx	5.90	
2nd place, silver medalist(s)	Paweł Wojciechowski	Poland	–	o	–	o	o	xxx						5.70	
3rd place, bronze medalist(s)	Jan Kudlička	Czech Republic	–	o	xo	–	o	xxx						5.70	
3rd place, bronze medalist(s)	Kévin Menaldo	France	o	–	xo	o	o	xxx						5.70	
5	Aleksandr Gripich	Russia	xo	o	xxo	o	xxx							5.65	
6	Piotr Lisek	Poland	o	o	xo	xo	x–	xx						5.65	
7	Konstadinos Filippidis	Greece	o	o	o	xxx								5.60	
8	Edi Maia	Portugal	xo	o	xxo	xxx								5.60	=SB
9	Karsten Dilla	Germany	o	–	xxx									5.40	
9	Sergey Kucheryanu	Russia	o	–	xx–	x								5.40	
11	Steven Lewis	Great Britain	xxo	–	x–	–	x							5.40	
	Diogo Ferreira	Portugal	xxx											NM	
	Ilya Mudrov	Russia	–	xxx										NM	
	Robert Sobera	Poland	xxx											NM	
