= Ilya Mudrov =

Russian pole vaulter

Personal information
- Full name: Ilya Igorevich Mudrov
- Born: 20 April 1993 (age 33) Poshekhonye, Russia
- Height: 1.92 m (6 ft 4 in)
- Weight: 77 kg (170 lb)

Sport
- Sport: Athletics
- Event: Pole vault
- Club: CSKA
- Coached by: Vladimir Rudenko; Tatyana Ogvozdina

Ilya Igorevich Mudrov (Russian: И́лья И́горевич Му́дров; born 17 November 1991) is a Russian athlete specialising in the pole vault. He competed at the 2017 World Championships in London without qualifying for the final. Additionally, he won a silver medal at the 2015 Summer Universiade.

His personal bests in the event are 5.80 metres outdoors (Moscow 2016) and 5.78 metres indoors (Malmö 2015).

== International competitions ==
Year	Competition	Venue	Position	Notes
Representing Russia
2013	European U23 Championships	Tampere, Finland	11th (q)	5.35 m^{1}
2014	European Championships	Zürich, Switzerland	3rd (q)	5.50 m^{1}
2015	Universiade	Gwangju, South Korea	2nd	5.50 m
Competing as Authorised Neutral Athlete
2017	World Championships	London, United Kingdom	22nd (q)	5.45 m
2018	European Championships	Berlin, Germany	–	NM

^{1}No mark in the final
