= Nikandros Stylianou =

Cypriot pole vaulter (born 1989)

Personal information
- Born: 22 August 1989 (age 37) Limassol, Cyprus
- Height: 1.80 m (5 ft 11 in)
- Weight: 74 kg (163 lb)

Sport
- Sport: Athletics
- Event: Pole vault

Nikandros Stylianou (Greek: Νίκανδρος Στυλιανού; born 22 August 1989) is a Cypriot athlete specialising in the pole vault. He won several medals at the Games of the Small States of Europe. In addition he represented his country at two outdoor and one indoor European Championships as well as three consecutive Commonwealth Games.

His personal bests in the event are 5.55 metres outdoors (Serravalle 2017) and 5.61 metres indoors (Belgrade 2017). The latter is the current national record.

== International competitions ==
Year	Competition	Venue	Position	Event	Notes
Representing Cyprus
2007	European Junior Championships	Hengelo, Netherlands	5th (q)	Pole vault	4.75 m^{1}
2007	Games of the Small States of Europe	Fontvieille, Monaco	3rd	Pole vault	4.70 m
2008	World Junior Championships	Bydgoszcz, Poland	16th (q)	Pole vault	4.90 m
2009	World Military Indoor Cup	Athens, Greece	5th	Pole vault	5.00 m
2009	Games of the Small States of Europe	Nicosia, Cyprus	1st	Pole vault	4.80 m
2010	Commonwealth Games	Delhi, India	5th	Pole vault	5.25 m
2011	Games of the Small States of Europe	Schaan, Liechtenstein	1st	Pole vault	5.00 m
2011	European U23 Championships	Ostrava, Czech Republic	13th (q)	Pole vault	4.95 m
2011	Universiade	Shenzhen, China	5th	Pole vault	5.35 m
2012	European Championships	Helsinki, Finland	–	Pole vault	NM
2013	European Indoor Championships	Gothenburg, Sweden	20th (q)	Pole vault	5.40 m
2013	Games of the Small States of Europe	Luxembourg City, Luxembourg	1st	Pole vault	5.15 m
2013	Mediterranean Games	Mersin, Turkey	–	Pole vault	NM
2014	Balkan Indoor Championships	Istanbul, Turkey	1st	Pole vault	5.28 m
2014	Commonwealth Games	Glasgow, United Kingdom	5th	Pole vault	5.35 m
2014	European Championships	Zurich, Switzerland	–	Pole vault	NM
2015	Balkan Indoor Championships	Istanbul, Turkey	1st	Pole vault	5.35 m
2015	Games of the Small States of Europe	Reykjavík, Iceland	1st	Pole vault	5.15 m
2015	Balkan Championships	Pitești, Romania	5th	Pole vault	4.90 m
2017	Balkan Indoor Championships	Belgrade, Serbia	3rd	Pole vault	5.61 m
2017	Games of the Small States of Europe	Serravalle, San Marino	1st	110 m hurdles	15.93 s
2017	Games of the Small States of Europe	Serravalle, San Marino	1st	Pole vault	5.55 m
2017	Balkan Championships	Novi Pazar, Serbia	3rd	Pole vault	5.10 m
2018	Balkan Indoor Championships	Istanbul, Turkey	2nd	Pole vault	5.25 m
2018	Commonwealth Games	Gold Coast, Queensland	7th	Pole vault	5.35 m
2018	European Championships	Berlin, Germany	22nd (q)	Pole vault	5.36 m
2018	Balkan Championships	Stara Zagora, Bulgaria		Pole vault	NH^{1}
2019	Games of the Small States of Europe	Bar, Montenegro	1st	Pole vault	5.40 m
2022	Mediterranean Games	Oran, Algeria	8th	Pole vault	5.30 m
2023	Games of the Small States of Europe	Marsa, Malta	3rd	Pole vault	5.20 m

^{1}No mark in the final
