= Robert Sobera =

Polish pole vaulter

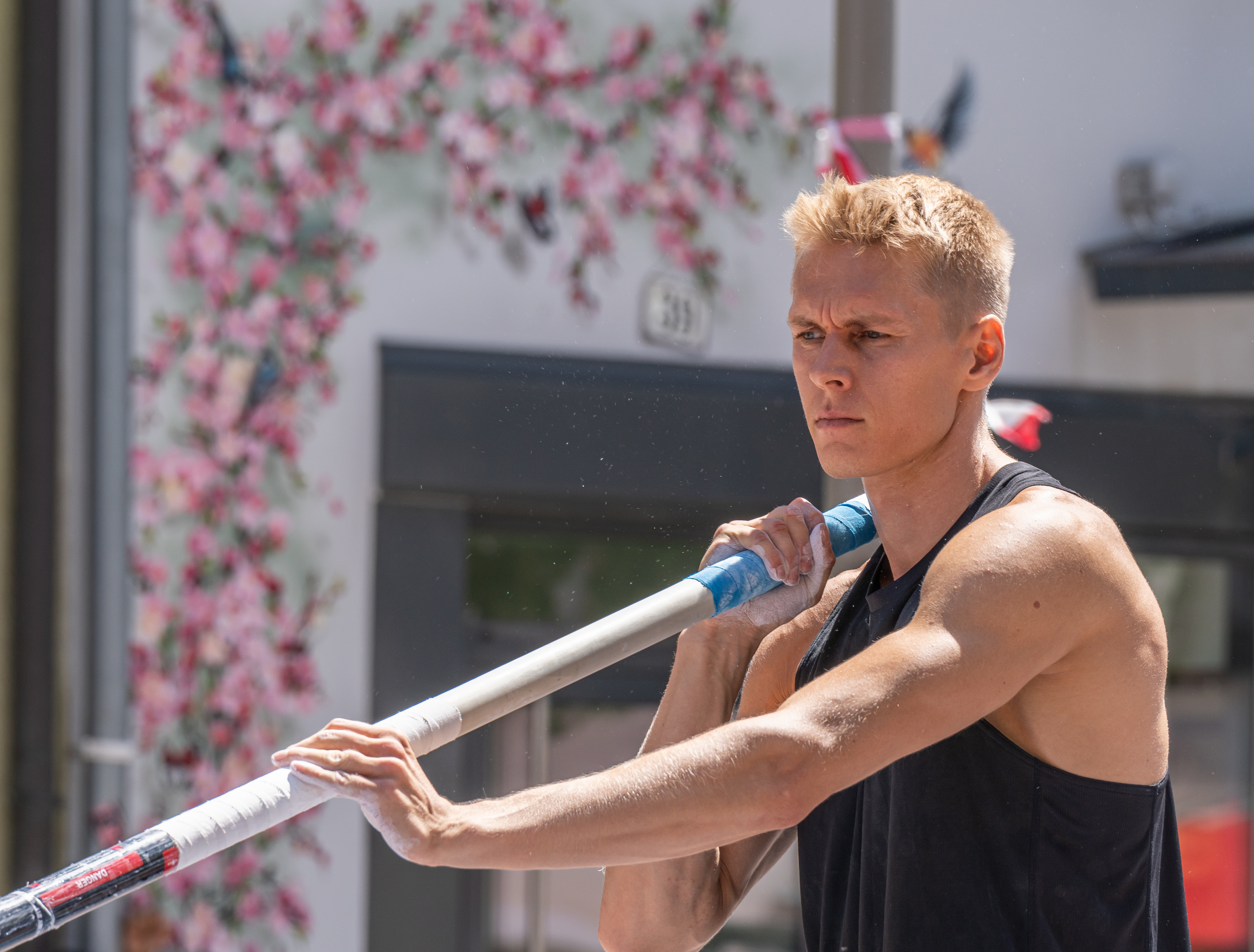
- Robert Sobera in 2025

Personal information
- Born: 19 January 1991 (age 35)
- Education: Academy of Physical Education in Wrocław
- Height: 1.91 m (6 ft 3 in)
- Weight: 85 kg (187 lb)

Sport
- Country: Poland
- Sport: Athletics
- Event: Pole vault
- Club: AZS AWF Wrocław
- Coached by: Dariusz Łoś
Medal record
Men's athletics
Representing Poland
European Championships
Gold medal – first place	2016 Amsterdam	Pole vault
European Team Championships
Gold medal – first place	2021 Chorzów	Pole vault
Universiade
Bronze medal – third place	2015 Gwangju	Pole vault
European U23 Championships
Silver medal – second place	2013 Tampere	pole vault

Robert Sobera (born 19 January 1991 in Wrocław) is a Polish pole vaulter, 2016 European Champion.

== Career ==
He finished sixth in the final at the 2013 European Athletics Indoor Championships and had the same place at the 2014 and 2016 World Indoor Championships.

He has personal bests of 5.80 metres outdoors (2014) and 5.81 metres indoors (2015).

== Competition record ==
Year	Competition	Venue	Position	Notes
Representing Poland
2009	European Junior Championships	Novi Sad, Serbia	11th	NM
2010	World Junior Championships	Moncton, Canada	4th	5.30 m
2011	European U23 Championships	Ostrava, Czech Republic	11th	5.20 m
2013	European Indoor Championships	Gothenburg, Sweden	6th	5.71 m
2013	European U23 Championships	Tampere, Finland	2nd	5.60 m
2013	World Championships	Moscow, Russia	–	NM
2014	World Indoor Championships	Sopot, Poland	6th	5.65 m
2014	European Championships	Zürich, Switzerland	3rd (q)	5.50 m
2015	European Indoor Championships	Prague, Czech Republic	4th	5.80 m
2015	Universiade	Gwangju, South Korea	3rd	5.50 m
2015	World Championships	Beijing, China	15th	5.50 m
2016	World Indoor Championships	Portland, United States	6th	5.65 m
2016	European Championships	Amsterdam, Netherlands	1st	5.60 m
2016	Olympic Games	Rio de Janeiro, Brazil	13th (q)	5.60 m
2017	Universiade	Taipei, Taiwan	–	NM
2018	European Championships	Berlin, Germany	25th (q)	5.36 m
2019	European Indoor Championships	Glasgow, United Kingdom	10th (q)	5.50 m
2019	World Championships	Doha, Qatar	19th (q)	5.60 m
2021	European Indoor Championships	Toruń, Poland	7th	5.50 m
2021	European Team Championships	Chorzów, Poland	1st	5.65 m
2021	Olympic Games	Tokyo, Japan	15th (q)	5.65 m
2022	World Championships	Eugene, United States	24th (q)	5.50 m
2022	European Championships	Munich, Germany	15th (q)	5.50 m
2023	World Championships	Budapest, Hungary	12th	5.55 m
2024	European Championships	Rome, Italy	–	NM
2024	Olympic Games	Paris, France	15th (q)	5.60 m
2025	European Indoor Championships	Apeldoorn, Netherlands	15th (q)	5.45 m
