= Pauls Pujāts =

Latvian pole vaulter

Pauls Pujats
Personal information
- Nationality: Latvian
- Born: August 6, 1991 (age 34)
- Height: 1.87 m (6 ft 1 1/2 in)
- Weight: 83 kg (183 lb)

Sport
- Sport: Men's athletics
- Event: Pole vault

Achievements and titles
- Personal best: Pole vault: 5.70 m (2016)

Pauls Pujats (born 6 August 1991) is a Latvian track and field athlete who competes in the pole vault coached by Tyler Fraizer. He represented his country at the 2016 Summer Olympics and was a finalist. He also competed at the European Athletics Championships in 2012 and 2014.

== Career ==
He was a finalist at the 2010 World Junior Championships in Athletics in Moncton, Canada, finishing in sixth place overall with a clearance of 5.10 metres.

He attended the University of Memphis from 2012 to 2015 and competed for their Memphis Tigers team. He was runner-up to Shawn Barber in the pole vault at the 2015 NCAA Division I Outdoor Track and Field Championships. He missed qualification for the 2012 Olympic Games in London by just ten centimetres.

In June 2012, he competed at the 2012 European Athletics Championships in Helsinki, Finland but failed to record a successful jump and did not proceed to the final.

In August 2014, he competed at the 2014 European Athletics Championships in Zurich, Switzerland.

He competed for Latvia at the 2016 Summer Olympics in Rio de Janeiro, where he reached the final after clearing 5.50 metres. However, he failed to reach the same heights in the final.

== Personal life ==
His brother older Karlis Pujats also attended the University of Memphis, with the older Karlis becoming the Memphis Tigers’ first All-American in pole vault. Both trained with the Memphis pole vaulting coach Tyler Fraizer. In 2016, he published a book Healthy food for Athletes aimed at urging young people to pay more attention to a healthy lifestyle and diet.

== International competitions ==
Year	Competition	Venue	Position	Event	Notes
2010	World Junior Championships	Moncton, Canada	6th	Pole vault	5.10 m
2011	European U23 Championships	Ostrava, Czech Republic	9th	Pole vault	5.30 m
2011	Universiade	Shenzhen, China	—	Pole vault	NM
2012	European Championships	Helsinki, Finland	—	Pole vault	NM
2013	European U23 Championships	Tampere, Finland	17th (q)	Pole vault	5.20 m
2014	European Championships	Zurich, Switzerland	—	Pole vault	NM
2016	Olympic Games	Rio de Janeiro, Brazil	12th	Pole vault	5.60 m
