= Renaud Lavillenie =

French pole vaulter (born 1986)

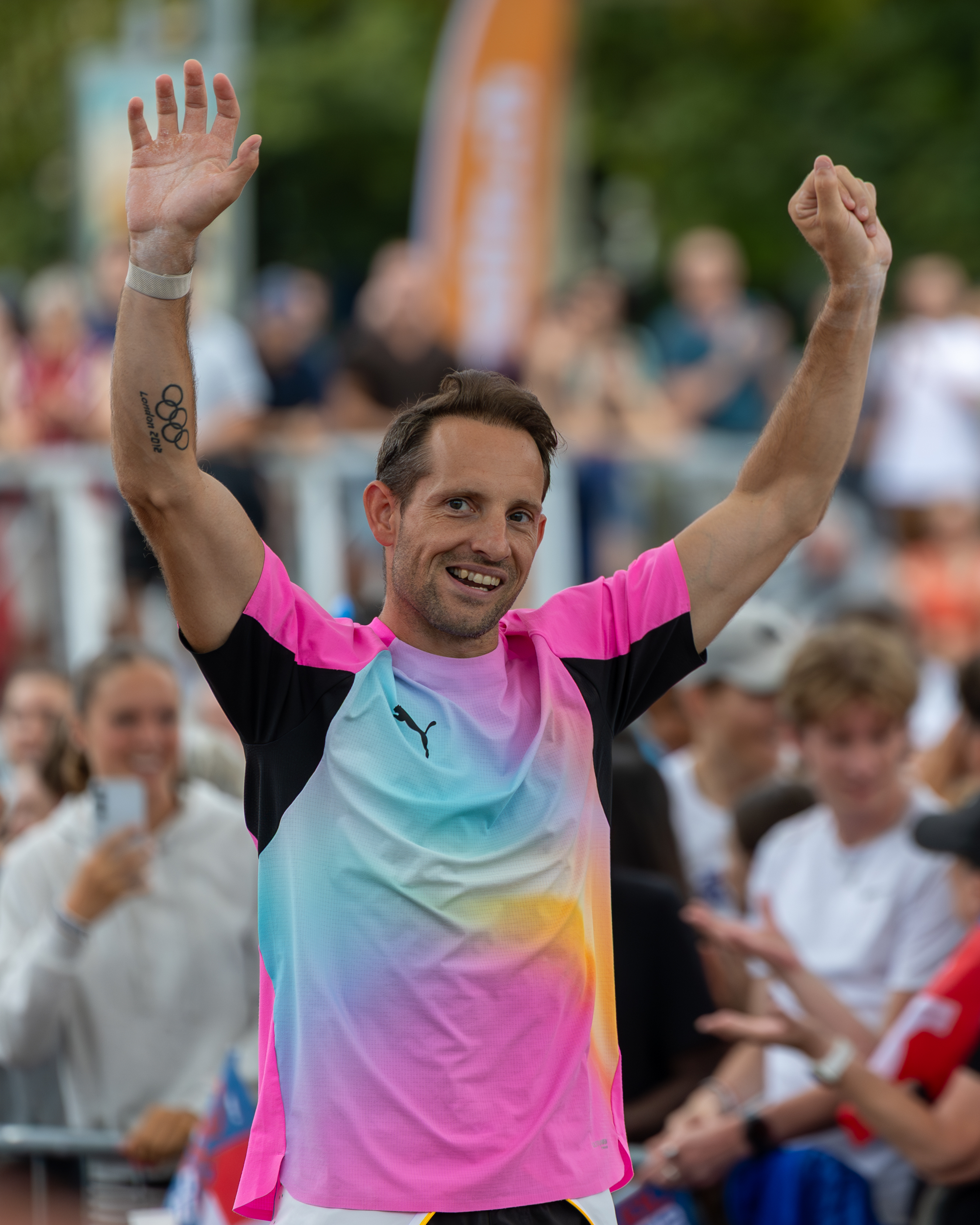
- Lavillenie at the 2026 Wanda Diamond League Athletissima

Personal information
- Born: 18 September 1986 (age 40) Barbezieux-Saint-Hilaire, France
- Height: 1.77 m (5 ft 10 in)
- Weight: 69 kg (152 lb)

Sport
- Country: France
- Sport: Athletics
- Event: Pole vault
- Club: Envol
- Coached by: Philippe d'Encausse

Achievements and titles
- Personal bests: Outdoor 6.05 m NR (Eugene 2015); Indoor 6.16i m NR (Donetsk 2014)
Medal record
| Event | 1st | 2nd | 3rd |
|---|---|---|---|
| Olympic Games | 1 | 1 | 0 |
| World Championships | 0 | 1 | 4 |
| World Indoor Championships | 3 | 0 | 0 |
| European Championships | 3 | 0 | 1 |
| European Indoor Championships | 4 | 0 | 0 |
| Continental Cup | 1 | 1 | 0 |
| Total | 12 | 3 | 5 |
Olympic Games
| Gold medal – first place | 2012 London | Pole vault |
| Silver medal – second place | 2016 Rio de Janeiro | Pole vault |
World Championships
| Silver medal – second place | 2013 Moscow | Pole vault |
| Bronze medal – third place | 2017 London | Pole vault |
| Bronze medal – third place | 2015 Beijing | Pole vault |
| Bronze medal – third place | 2011 Daegu | Pole vault |
| Bronze medal – third place | 2009 Berlin | Pole vault |
World Indoor Championships
| Gold medal – first place | 2018 Birmingham | Pole vault |
| Gold medal – first place | 2016 Portland | Pole vault |
| Gold medal – first place | 2012 Istanbul | Pole vault |
European Championships
| Gold medal – first place | 2014 Zurich | Pole vault |
| Gold medal – first place | 2012 Helsinki | Pole vault |
| Gold medal – first place | 2010 Barcelona | Pole vault |
| Bronze medal – third place | 2018 Berlin | Pole vault |
European Indoor Championships
| Gold medal – first place | 2015 Prague | Pole vault |
| Gold medal – first place | 2013 Gothenburg | Pole vault |
| Gold medal – first place | 2011 Paris | Pole vault |
| Gold medal – first place | 2009 Turin | Pole vault |
Continental Cup
| Gold medal – first place | 2014 Marrakesh | Pole vault |
| Silver medal – second place | 2018 Ostrava | Pole vault |
| Silver medal – second place | 2010 Split | Pole vault |

Renaud Lavillenie (French pronunciation: [ʁə.no la.vi.lə.ni] or [ʁə.no la.vil.ni]; born 18 September 1986) is a French pole vaulter. Lavillenie won the gold medal at the 2012 Olympics in London and the silver medal at the 2016 Olympics in Rio. In addition to his Olympic success, he has won three World Indoor Championships gold medals, three European Championships gold medals and four European Indoor Championships gold medals. He has also won one silver medal and four bronze medals at the World Championships. As of 25 August 2016, he holds the French national records for the highest pole vault clearance both outdoors (6.05 m) and indoors (6.16 m). The 6.16 was the absolute world record for the pole vault for over six years, 2014–2020. He was the pole vault overall winner of the IAAF Diamond League in seven consecutive years, from 2010 to 2016.

Outside pole vaulting, Lavillenie is a keen motorcyclist, and raced in the 2013 Le Mans 24 Hours for motorcycles, finishing 25th. Lavillenie subsequently entered the 2014 race, aiming for a top 20 finish. Lavillenie's younger brother Valentin Lavillenie is also a pole vaulter.

== Early life ==
Renaud Lavillenie was born in Barbezieux-Saint-Hilaire, Charente, France. His father was a pole vaulter. Renaud made his pole vault competition debut in 2003, at the age of 17.

== Pole vaulting career ==
=== 2008 ===
Lavillenie's 2008 outdoor personal best was 5.65 m, achieved on 27 June in Villeneuve-d'Ascq. His 2008 indoor personal best was 5.81 metres, achieved on 5 December in Aulnay-sous-Bois.

=== 2009: broke Jean Galfione's 10-year-old French national outdoor pole vault record ===
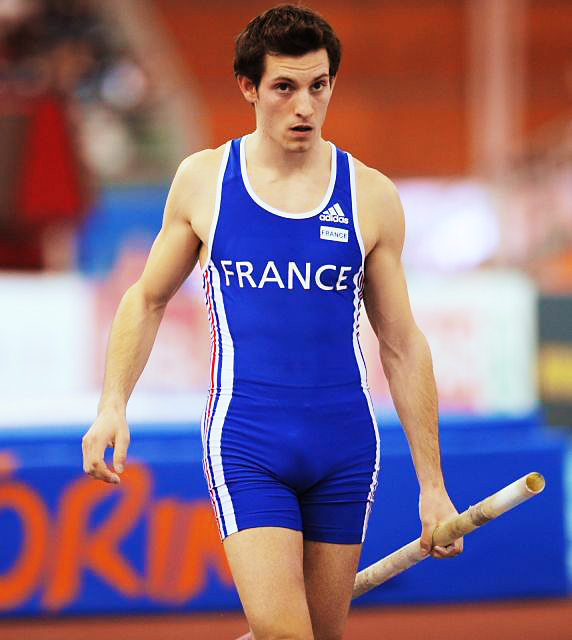
Lavillenie at the 2009 European Indoor Championships

Lavillenie's 2009 indoor personal best was also 5.80 m – he cleared that height in Moscow and to win the 2009 European Indoor Championships pole vault final in Turin.

Lavillenie improved his outdoor personal best to 5.81 m in May 2009, beating veteran French pole vaulter Romain Mesnil in Forbach. Two weeks later, he improved his outdoor personal best to 5.96 m at a meeting in Aubière, setting a world-leading outdoor mark. He achieved another world-leading outdoor mark with a winning jump of 6.01 m on 21 June 2009 at the 2009 European Team Championships in Leiria, Portugal. That 6.01-metre mark broke Jean Galfione's ten-year-old French national outdoor record of 5.98 m set in Amiens on 23 July 1999 and would remain as the French national outdoor record until Lavillenie beat it by 1 cm in July 2013. At the 2009 World Championships, Lavillenie vaulted 5.80 m in the pole vault final to win the bronze medal (his first medal in the Olympic Games, World Championships or World Indoor Championships) behind Steven Hooker and Romain Mesnil. He also took part in the 2009 IAAF World Athletics Final but failed to record a mark and finished last.

=== 2010: first European Championships gold medal ===
At the 2010 World Indoor Championships, Lavillenie's only cleared 5.45 m in the qualification round and did not qualify for the final. He enjoyed better success at the inaugural 2010 IAAF Diamond League (all events were held outdoors), in which he won four of the seven pole vault events to become its pole vault overall winner. At the Adidas Grand Prix on 12 June 2010, he won the pole vault event with a jump of 5.85 m (which was a meeting record), beating Steven Hooker into second place. Seven weeks later, he captured his first European Championships pole vault title in Barcelona, with a jump of 5.85 m in the final.

=== 2011: broke Jean Galfione's 12-year-old French national indoor pole vault record ===
On 5 March 2011, in the 2011 European Indoor Championships pole vault final in Paris, Lavillenie vaulted 6.03 m to win his second consecutive European Indoor Championships gold medal and break the French national indoor pole vault record that had been held by Jean Galfione (6.00 m) since 6 March 1999. That jump of 6.03 m was the third-highest personal best indoor clearance of all time. Only Sergey Bubka (6.15 m in 1993) and Steve Hooker (6.06 m in 2009) had registered higher personal best indoor clearances. Lavillenie only managed fifth place (5.50 m) in the pole vault event of the outdoor 2011 European Team Championships. He won four of the seven pole vault events in the 2011 IAAF Diamond League to become its pole vault overall winner for the second year running. At the 2011 World Championships he cleared 5.85 m to win the World Championships pole vault bronze medal for the second time running.

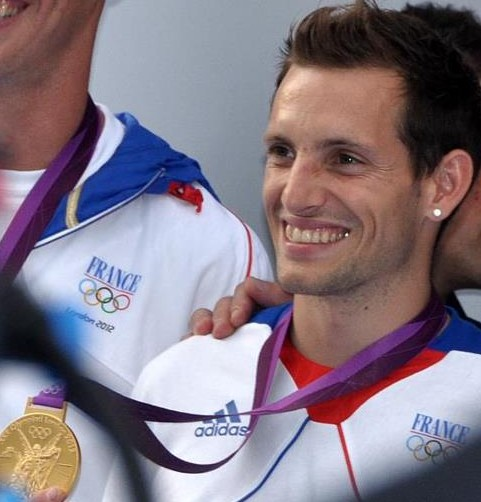
Renaud Lavillenie in 2012

Lavillenie underwent surgery on his left hand after he broke it due to a snapped pole accident in December 2011.

=== 2012: won the Olympic Games and World Indoor Championships gold medals for the first time ===
Lavillenie returned to competition in February 2012 and won the Pole Vault Stars meet with a clearance of 5.82 m.

At the 2012 World Indoor Championships, Lavillenie won his first World Indoor Championships or World Championships gold medal by clearing 5.95 m in the final, which was 15 cm better than the silver and bronze medallists.

At the 2012 European Championships, Lavillenie cleared 5.97 m in the final to win the European Championships gold medal for the second time in a row.

At the 2012 Olympic Games, Lavillenie won the gold medal by clearing 5.97 m (a new Olympic record) in the final. He was in the bronze medal position (5.85 m) behind two Germans at 5.91 m – Björn Otto and Raphael Holzdeppe – when he cleared the aforementioned height on his third and final attempt. He had earlier failed to clear 5.91 m on his first attempt and 5.97 m on his second. After securing the gold medal when Otto and Holzdeppe failed later to match or better his 5.97 m, Lavillenie had one failed attempt at 6.02 m and two unsuccessful attempts at 6.07 m. He thus won France its 14th track and field Olympic gold medal in history, became the first French track and field Olympic champion since 1996 and the third French men's Olympic pole vault champion.

Lavillenie won five of the seven pole vault events in the 2012 IAAF Diamond League to become its pole vault overall winner for the third year running.

=== 2013 indoor season: third consecutive European Indoor Championships gold medal ===
At the 2013 European Indoor Championships, Lavillenie won the pole vault title for the third time in a row after clearing 6.01 m in the final. He did not miss any attempts at 6.01 m and below, with first time clearances at 5.61, 5.76, 5.86, 5.91, 5.96 and 6.01 m. After two unsuccessful attempts at 6.07 m, his third attempt at this height was judged by the competition officials as a foul. Although the bar did not fall during this third attempt, the competition officials later explained that in clearing the bar, Lavillenie had shifted it further than was admissible. The International Association of Athletics Federations regulation which operated in this case was Rule 182.2.a, which states that a vault shall be declared ineligible if "the bar does not remain on both pegs because of the action of the athlete".

=== 2013 outdoor season: third consecutive World Championships medal ===
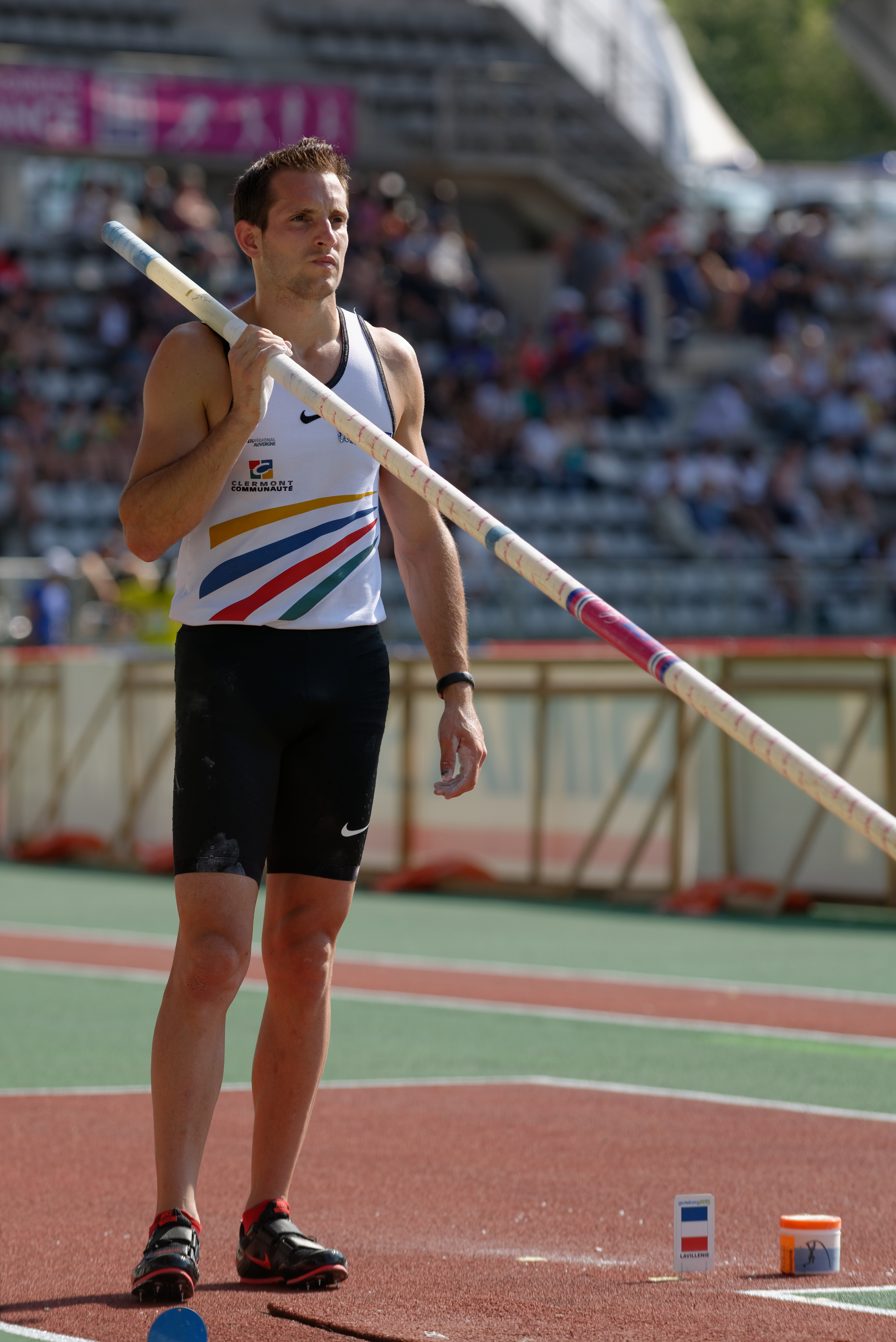
Renaud Lavillenie in 2013

At 27 July 2013 London Grand Prix fixture of the 2013 IAAF Diamond League, Lavillenie cleared 6.02 m to secure victory, setting a meeting record for the pole vault and beating his own French national outdoor pole vault record by 1 cm. He then had the bar raised to a height of 6.16 m, but he failed to clear that height three consecutive times. If he had succeeded, he would have broken Sergey Bubka's world outdoor record of 6.14 m set in 1994. Lavillenie went on to become the pole vault overall winner of the 2013 IAAF Diamond League – he won five of its eight pole vault events – for the fourth consecutive year.

Lavillenie was the overwhelming favorite to win the 2013 World Championships pole vault title in Moscow. He had dominated the event since the start of 2013. Coming into these world championships, he had achieved the six world-best vaults of the year, was the only man to have gone beyond the 6-metre mark both indoors and outdoors and had cleared the year's highest outdoor height of 6.02 m just two weeks before at the London Grand Prix. In the final of the 2013 World Championships, only Lavillenie and the German pole vaulter Raphael Holzdeppe managed to clear 5.89 m. Both of them failed to clear the next greater height of 5.96 m three consecutive times. Holzdeppe beat Lavillenie to the gold medal by virtue of his clearing the previous height of 5.89 m on his first attempt, whereas Lavillenie needed three attempts to clear 5.89 m. Lavillenie thus won the silver medal with a height of 5.89 m, the same height as Holzdeppe.

Lavillenie attempted to break the 14-year-old world decathlon best in the pole vault event (5.76 m, set by Tim Lobinger on 16 September 1999) at the annual Décastar meeting in September 2013, but he managed only to clear a height of 5.47 m in his specialist event.

Despite not winning the World Championship title, the flying Frenchman lost only one other outdoor competition all season and he won the IAAF Diamond League race for his event for the fourth consecutive time in 2013.

=== 2014 indoor season: broke absolute world record ===
Lavillenie was unbeaten in six indoor meetings during the 2014 winter season, and improved his national indoor record three times, including his world record performance in Donetsk, Ukraine, on 15 February.

On 31 January 2014, Lavillenie cleared 6.08 m with some room to spare on his first attempt, at the Pedro's Cup indoors meeting in Bydgoszcz, Poland. Six days earlier, he had cleared 6.04 m in Rouen to set a new national indoor record. The 6.08 m clearance in Bydgoszcz was the world's second highest personal best indoor clearance in history, behind Sergey Bubka's 6.15 m indoor world record set in Donetsk in 1993. It also enabled Lavillenie to overtake Steve Hooker to become the world's second-best pole vaulter (personal best indoor and outdoor clearances taken into consideration) in history, behind Bubka's personal bests of 6.14 m (outdoor) and 6.15 m (indoor). In both the Bydgoszcz and Rouen meetings, Lavillenie had the bar raised to a height of 6.16 m, but in both meetings he failed in all his three attempts to clear that height.

Lavillenie claimed the men's world record with 6.16 m on 15 February 2014. Competing in the annual Pole Vault Stars meeting in Sergey Bubka's hometown of Donetsk, Ukraine, Lavillenie entered the competition at 5.76 m and cleared that height as well as 5.91 m on his first attempts before needing all three tries to get over 6.01 m. With the bar set at 6.16 m and Bubka looking on from the stands, Lavillenie flew over the bar on his first try. 6.16 m was the new absolute world record, exceeding both Bubka's 6.14 m outdoors and 6.15 m indoors that some had considered impossible to beat. It was Lavillenie's fourth consecutive win in the Pole Vault Stars meeting, and came one week short of 21 years since Bubka set the record of 6.15 m at that competition in 1993. "It is going to take me some time to come back to earth because it is incredible," Lavillenie said. "This is a world record that is so mythical, and to clear it on the first jump, without touching (the bar) – there is nothing to say. It is just a moment to savor." Holding his head in his hands in disbelief, Lavillenie looked wild-eyed and then pumped his arms in delight, before running with his arms outstretched to soak up the atmosphere. The vault occurred in Ukraine's fifth largest city just three days before the beginning of the 2014 Ukrainian revolution. After a lengthy delay due to the official measurement of the world record 6.16 m, Lavillenie had the bar raised 5 cm to 6.21 m. On his first attempt, he could not control the pole after planting it in the box – the pole pushed him backwards and as he fell off the elevated runway the spikes of his right shoe lacerated the inside of his left ankle that was on the edge of the runway. Fortunately, Lavillenie did not suffer any damage to his ankle ligament or bone. He was given 16 stitches in a Donetsk hospital to close his ankle wound. Although not a serious injury, the nearly 4-inch long gash put an immediate end to Lavillenie's indoor season, forcing him to withdraw from both the Championnats de France d'athlétisme en salle (the French national indoor athletics championships) to be held in Bordeaux on 22–23 February and the 2014 IAAF World Indoor Championships to be held in Sopot, Poland on 7–9 March. Lavillenie was given a hero's welcome when he landed home on 16 February, showing up in the Charles de Gaulle Airport terminal building in crutches before a horde of journalists. The new world record holder arrived home to an outpouring of praise from all quarters in a country where pole-vaulting is held in the highest esteem. "The New Czar," headlined the L'Équipe sports daily, saying that his giant leap in Ukraine had been "a major landmark in the history of sport." Lavillenie's compatriot, Jean Galfione, who won the 1996 Olympic pole vault gold medal, said, "Doing better than Bubka, it is like going faster than Usain Bolt, having better statistics than Michael Jordan. He has just dethroned a legend." Sergey Bubka recalled that he was the first to congratulate and states that, "It was great, a historical moment. It was really an incredible performance. I am very happy that I passed the baton to such a great athlete and such a great personality and role model. I always felt it could happen. I hoped it would be soon" . On 9 March, the last day of the 2014 World Indoor Championships, the IAAF announced that it had ratified (certified) his world record jump.

=== 2014 outdoor season ===
Lavillenie returned to competition in the Drake Relays track and field meeting held in Des Moines, Iowa at the end of April, where he won the pole vault event with a jump of 5.70 m. On 18 May, he won the pole vault event at the Shanghai leg of the 2014 Diamond League, clearing 5.92 m on the first attempt. This 5.92 m clearance was a meeting record and the world-leading performance of the year. In that Shanghai meeting, he attempted to break his outdoor personal best of 6.02 m, but he failed to clear 6.03 m in all his three attempts.

=== 2016 Olympics in Rio ===
Lavillenie was the favorite to win the Olympic gold in pole vaulting, but a strong performance from the host country's Thiago Braz da Silva left him with the silver medal. Lavillenie cleared 5.93 m with his third effort at the finals. This meant that each of the five other competing athletes had to equal or beat their personal best to stay in the competition. Only da Silva managed to do so. Lavillenie managed to clear the next height, 5.98 m, easily with his first attempt, but da Silva decided to skip 5.98 m and went on to 6.03 m. With a successful second attempt at 6.03 m, da Silva set a new Olympic Record. Lavillenie, having failed his first two attempts at 6.03 m, attempted 6.08 with his final jump but failed, knocking the bar off with his knee. Lavillenie was booed by the crowd during the competition and the medal ceremony, causing him to break down in tears as da Silva attempted to calm the crowd and support Lavillenie. Lavillenie compared the incident to Jesse Owens being booed at the Olympics in 1936, although he later apologized for the comment, saying it was made in the heat of the moment and he deeply regretted it.

=== 2020 ===
As the COVID-19 pandemic shut down most public sports events, Lavillenie conceived an event whereupon athletes could compete against others from their respective backyards: the event, billed "The Ultimate Garden Clash", was picked up by World Athletics, and was streamed live online on 3 May 2020. The event rules were changed so that vaulters had to clear a fixed 5m bar as many times as possible in two 15-minute stretches; in the event, Lavillenie ended up in a tie with Mondo Duplantis, each clearing the bar 36 times, ahead of Sam Kendricks with 26. Two weeks later, the women's event was held, with Katerina Stefanidi, Katie Nageotte and Alysha Newman.

== Competition record ==
| Year | Competition | Venue | Position | Notes |
Representing France
| 2007 | European U23 Championships | Debrecen, Hungary | 10th | 5.30 m |
| 2008 | World Indoor Championships | Valencia, Spain | 13th (q) | 5.55 m |
| 2009 | European Indoor Championships | Turin, Italy | 1st | 5.81 m |
| 2009 | World Championships | Berlin, Germany | 3rd | 5.80 m |
| 2010 | World Indoor Championships | Doha, Qatar | 10th (q) | 5.45 m |
| 2010 | European Championships | Barcelona, Spain | 1st | 5.85 m |
| 2010 | Continental Cup | Split, Croatia | 2nd | 5.90 m^{1} |
| 2011 | European Indoor Championships | Paris, France | 1st | 6.03 m |
| 2011 | World Championships | Daegu, South Korea | 3rd | 5.85 m |
| 2012 | World Indoor Championships | Istanbul, Turkey | 1st | 5.95 m |
| 2012 | European Championships | Helsinki, Finland | 1st | 5.97 m |
| 2012 | Olympic Games | London, United Kingdom | 1st | 5.97 m |
| 2013 | European Indoor Championships | Gothenburg, Sweden | 1st | 6.01 m |
| 2013 | World Championships | Moscow, Russia | 2nd | 5.89 m |
| 2014 | European Championships | Zurich, Switzerland | 1st | 5.90 m |
| 2014 | Continental Cup | Marrakesh, Morocco | 1st | 5.80 m^{1} |
| 2015 | European Indoor Championships | Prague, Czech Republic | 1st | 6.04 m |
| 2015 | World Championships | Beijing, China | 3rd | 5.80 m |
| 2016 | World Indoor Championships | Portland, United States | 1st | 6.02 m |
| 2016 | European Championships | Amsterdam, Netherlands | 1st (q) | 5.60 m^{2} |
| 2016 | Olympic Games | Rio de Janeiro, Brazil | 2nd | 5.98 m |
| 2017 | World Championships | London, United Kingdom | 3rd | 5.89 m |
| 2018 | World Indoor Championships | Birmingham, United Kingdom | 1st | 5.90 m |
| 2018 | European Championships | Berlin, Germany | 3rd | 5.95 m |
| 2019 | World Championships | Doha, Qatar | 15th (q) | 5.60 m |
| 2021 | Olympic Games | Tokyo, Japan | 8th | 5.70 m |
| 2022 | World Championships | Eugene, United States | 5th | 5.87 m |
| 2022 | European Championships | Munich, Germany | 7th | 5.65 m |
| 2025 | European Indoor Championships | Apeldoorn, Netherlands | 11th | 5.60 m |
| 2025 | World Championships | Tokyo, Japan | 8th | 5.75 m |

== Awards ==
- French Legion of Honour (April, 18th 2014)
- IAAF Men's World Athlete of the Year: 2014
- Men's Track & Field Athlete of the Year: 2014
- Men's European Athlete of the Year: 2014
- L'Équipe Champion of Champions (International): 2014
- L'Équipe Champion of Champions (France): 2014

== Personal bests ==
Information from World Athletics profile unless otherwise noted.

Indoor

As of 4 July 2025

| Event | Performance | Location | Date |
|---|---|---|---|
| Long jump | 7.22 m (23 ft 8 1/4 in) | Aubière | 16 January 2010 |
| High jump | 1.89 m (6 ft 2 1/4 in) | Aubière | 20 December 2008 |
| Pole vault | 6.16 m (20 ft 2 1/2 in) | Donetsk | 15 February 2014 |

Outdoor

As of 4 July 2025

| Event | Performance | Location | Date |
|---|---|---|---|
| 100 metres | 11.04 (+0.6 m/s) | Bondoufle | 22 May 2011 |
| 110 metres hurdles | 14.51 (+2.0 m/s) | Franconville | 23 May 2010 |
| Long jump | 7.37 m (24 ft 2 in) (+0.0 m/s) | Aix-les-Bains | 20 May 2012 |
| Pole vault | 6.05 m (19 ft 10 in) | Eugene | 30 May 2015 |

| Event | Performance | Location | Date | Score |
|---|---|---|---|---|
| Decathlon | —N/a | Talence | 14–15 September 2013 | 6,676 points |
| 100 metres | 11.38 (−0.9 m/s) | Talence | 14 September 2013 | 778 points |
| Long jump | 7.18 m (23 ft 6 1/2 in) (+0.0 m/s) | Talence | 14 September 2013 | 857 points |
| Shot put | 9.30 m (30 ft 6 in) | Talence | 14 September 2013 | 444 points |
| High jump | 1.87 m (6 ft 1 1/2 in) | Talence | 14 September 2013 | 687 points |
| 400 metres | 53.84 | Talence | 14 September 2013 | 646 points |
| 110 metres hurdles | 15.13 (+0.0 m/s) | Talence | 15 September 2013 | 834 points |
| Discus throw | 30.13 m (98 ft 10 in) | Talence | 15 September 2013 | 465 points |
| Pole vault | 5.47 m (17 ft 11 1/4 in) | Talence | 15 September 2013 | 1,058 points |
| Javelin throw | 38.86 m (127 ft 5 3/4 in) | Talence | 15 September 2013 | 426 points |
| 1500 metres | 5:14.19 | Talence | 15 September 2013 | 481 points |
| Virtual Best Performance | | | | 6,676 points |

== Personal life ==
Lavillenie married Anaïs Poumarat in 2018, following 11 years of dating. Poumarat is also a pole vaulter. They have a daughter, Iris, who was born in July 2017.

== See also ==
- 6 metres club
- French records in athletics
- French all-time top lists – Pole vault

Records
| Preceded by Sergey Bubka | Men's pole vault world record holder 15 February 2014 – 8 February 2020 | Succeeded by Armand Duplantis |
Sporting positions
| Preceded by Steven Hooker; Björn Otto | Men's Pole Vault Best Year Performance; 2009; 2013 – 2015 | Succeeded by Björn Otto; Incumbent |
Awards
| Preceded by Usain Bolt | IAAF World Athlete of the Year; 2014 | Succeeded by Ashton Eaton |
| Preceded by Rafael Nadal | L'Équipe Champion of Champions; 2014 | Succeeded by Usain Bolt |
| Preceded by Tony Parker | French Sportsman of the Year; 2014 | Succeeded by Florent Manaudou |
| Preceded by Bohdan Bondarenko | Men's Track & Field Athlete of the Year; 2014 | Succeeded by Ashton Eaton |
