= Didac Salas =

Spanish pole vaulter

Personal information
- Born: 19 May 1993 (age 33) Rubí, Spain
- Height: 1.87 m (6 ft 2 in)
- Weight: 75 kg (165 lb)

Sport
- Sport: Athletics
- Event: Pole vault
- Club: F.C. Barcelona
- Coached by: Gabriel Martínez

Didac Salas Planas (born 19 May 1993) is a Spanish athlete specialising in the pole vault. He won the gold medal at the 2010 Summer Youth Olympics.

His personal bests in the event are 5.60 metres outdoors (Palafrugell 2014) and 5.60 metres indoors (Prague 2015).

== Competition record ==
Year	Competition	Venue	Position	Notes
Representing Spain
2009	World Youth Championships	Brixen, Italy	10th	4.65 m
2010	World Junior Championships	Moncton, Canada	11th (q)	5.05 m^{1}
2010	Youth Olympic Games	Singapore	1st	5.05 m
2011	European Junior Championships	Tallinn, Estonia	3rd	5.40 m
2012	World Junior Championships	Barcelona, Spain	4th	5.50 m
2012	European Championships	Helsinki, Finland	14th (q)	5.30 m
2013	European U23 Championships	Tampere, Finland	9th (q)	5.35 m^{1}
2014	Mediterranean U23 Championship	Aubagne, France	2nd	5.57 m
2014	European Championships	Zürich, Switzerland	–	NM
2015	European Indoor Championships	Prague, Czech Republic	10th (q)	5.60 m
2015	European U23 Championships	Tallinn, Estonia	5th	5.40 m
2016	European Championships	Amsterdam, Netherlands	27th (q)	5.15 m
2018	European Championships	Berlin, Germany	29th (q)	5.36 m
2018	Ibero-American Championships	Trujillo, Peru	3rd	5.10 m
2022	Ibero-American Championships	La Nucía, Spain	1st	5.40 m

^{1}No mark in the final
