= Kévin Menaldo =

French pole vaulter (born 1992)

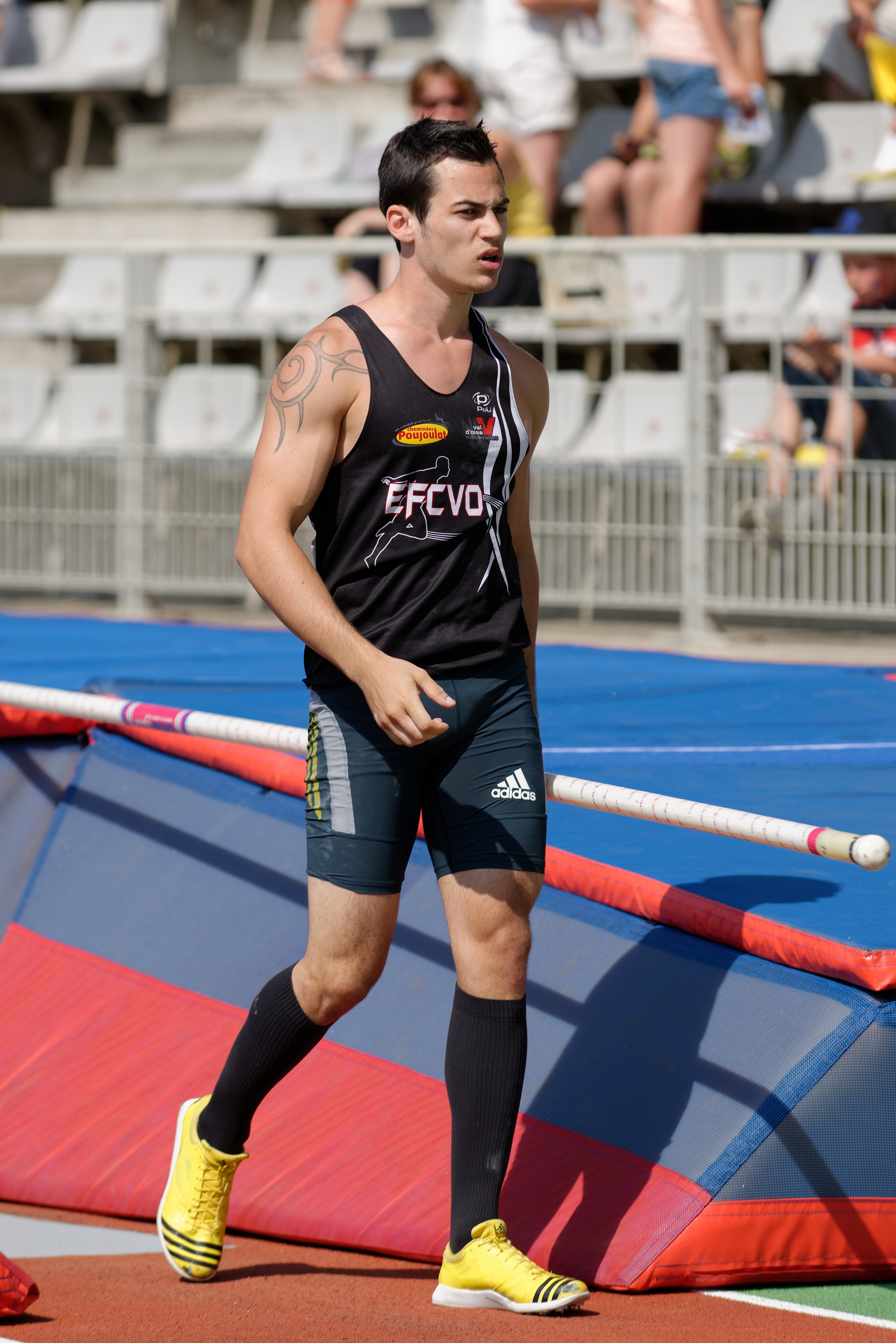
- Menaldo at the 2013 French Championships

Personal information
- Born: 12 July 1992 (age 34) Bordeaux, France
- Height: 1.76 m (5 ft 9 in)
- Weight: 66 kg (146 lb)

Sport
- Country: France
- Sport: Athletics (track and field)
- Event: Pole vault
Medal record
European Championships
Bronze medal – third place	2014 Zürich	Pole vault
Mediterranean Games
Silver medal – second place	2013 Mersin	Pole vault

Kévin Menaldo (born 12 July 1992) is a French track and field athlete who competes in the pole vault. He has a personal best of 5.75 m (18 ft 10 1/4 in) (set indoors in 2014) and was the silver medallist at the 2013 Mediterranean Games.

Born in Bordeaux, he began training with former Olympic pole vault medalist Thierry Vigneron in 2009. The year he came seventh at the 2009 World Youth Championships in Athletics and also won at the 2009 Gymnasiade with a personal best of 5.05 m (16 ft 6 3/4 in) (his first clearance over five metres). He added a further five centimetres to his best in 2010 and won the French junior title. He continued to improve the following season, which culminated in a silver medal at the 2011 European Athletics Junior Championships with a vault of 5.50 m (18 ft 1/2 in). He had an indoor best of 5.43 m (17 ft 9 3/4 in) at the start of 2012 but faltered in the outdoor season, failed to register a height at the French Athletics Championships.

Menaldo was sixth at the French championships indoors and out in 2013. He came fourth at the European Champion Clubs Cup and bettered his 2011 best with a vault of 5.60 m (18 ft 4 1/4 in) at the 2013 Mediterranean Games which brought him his first senior medal (a silver) behind Giuseppe Gibilisco, who set a championship record. He also competed at the 2013 European Athletics U23 Championships, but performed poorly and did not get past the qualifying. He cleared 5.75 m (18 ft 10 1/4 in) at the beginning of the 2014 indoor season and went on to claim his first national title at the French Indoor Championships.
