= Claudio Stecchi =

Italian pole vaulter (born 1991)

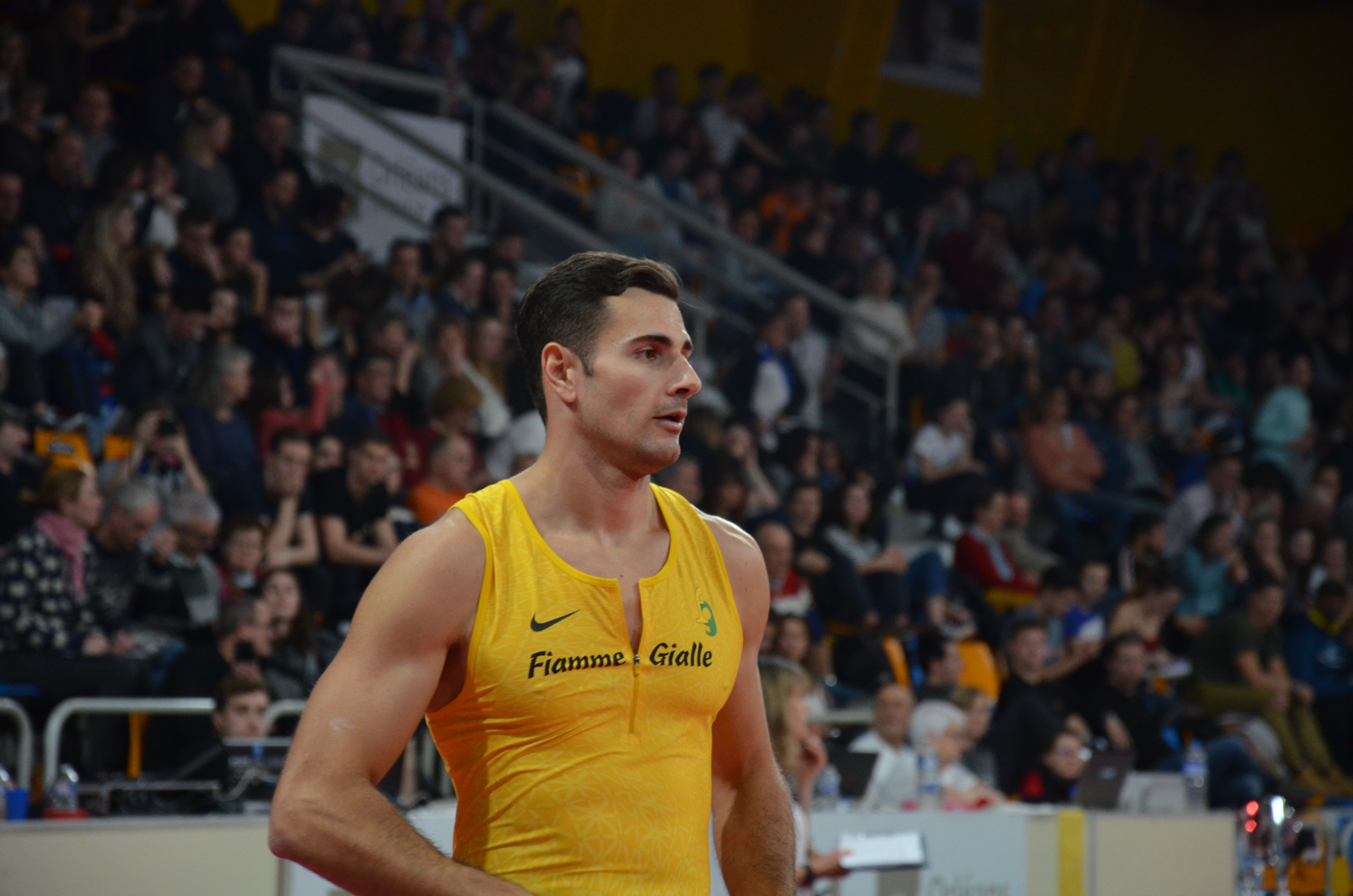
- Stecchi in 2020

Personal information
- Full name: Claudio Michel Stecchi
- National team: Italy
- Born: November 23, 1991 (age 34) Bagno a Ripoli, Italy
- Height: 1.86 m (6 ft 1 in)
- Weight: 74 kg (163 lb)

Sport
- Sport: Athletics
- Event: Pole vault
- Club: Fiamme Gialle
- Coached by: Riccardo Calcini (2008-2019); Giuseppe Gibilisco (2020- )

Achievements and titles
- Personal bests: Pole vault: 5.82 m (2020); Pole vault indoor: 5,82 m (2023)
Medal record
Men's athletics
Representing Italy
Summer Universiade
Bronze medal – third place	2017 Taipei	Pole vault
World Junior Championships
Silver medal – second place	2010 Moncton	Pole vault

Claudio Michel Stecchi (born 23 November 1991) is an Italian pole vaulter. He competed at the 2020 Summer Olympics, in Pole vault.

== Biography ==
He is the son of the former Italian pole vaulter Gianni Stecchi (born 1958). His personal best is 5.82 m (indoor, 2023). He won six times the national championship. His assistant coach is the Italian former pole vaulter World champion, Giuseppe Gibilisco.

=== Jumps over 5.70 m in 2019 ===
Date	Competition	Venue	Position	Measure	Note
24 February	All Star Pole Vault Meet	(France) Clermont-Ferrand	6th	5.80 m	PB
12 February	Szczecin Pole Vault Meeting	(Poland) Szczecin	3rd	5.78 m	PB
27 August	Palio Città della Quercia	(Italy) Rovereto	2nd	5.72 m	outdoor PB
1 March	European Indoor Championships	(Scotland) Glasgow	5th	5.70 m	(Note: Qualification round.)
19 January	Top Perche Plus	(France) Nevers	1st	5.70 m	
19 September	Meeting di salto con l’asta	(Italy) Castel Porziano	2nd	5.70 m	
28 September	World Championships	(Qatar) Doha	F	5.75 m	outdoor PB
1 October	World Championships	(Qatar) Doha	8th	5.70 m	

== Personal bests ==
Outdoor

- Pole vault: 5.82 m ( (Italy) Chiari, 8 September 2020)

Indoor

- Pole vault: 5.80 m ( (France) Clermont-Ferrand, 24 February 2019)

== Progression ==
Personal Best

=== Outdoor ===
Year	Performance	Venue	Date
2022	inactive		
2021	inactive		
2019	5.75	Doha (QAT)	28 September 2019
2018	5.67	Linz (AUT)	12 September 2018
2017	5.60	Liège (BEL)	19 July 2017
2015	5.55	Liège (BEL)	15 July 2015
2013	5.60	Rieti (ITA)	5 July 2013
2012	5.60	Bressanone (ITA)	7 July 2012
2011	5.55	Ostrava (CZE)	16 July 2011
2010	5.40	Moncton (CAN)	22 July 2010
2009	5.10	Madrid (ESP)	8 August 2009
2008	5.11	Pessac (FRA)	25 June 2008

=== Indoor ===
Year	Performance	Venue	Date
2022/23	5.82	Liévin (FRA)	15 February 2023
2020/22	inactive		
2020/21	inactive		
2019/20	5.73	Bordeaux (FRA)	18 January 2020
2018/19	5.80	Clermont-Ferrand (FRA)	24 February 2019
2017/18	5.55	Padova (ITA)	27 January 2018
2016/17	5.40	Padova (ITA)	28 January 2017
2014/15	5.40	Linz (AUT)	6 February 2015
2011/12	5.60	Ancona (ITA)	25 February 2012
2010/11	5.50	Ancona (ITA)	19 February 2011
2009/10	5.31	Firenze (ITA)	8 February 2010
2008/09	5.03	Cercy-la-Tour (FRA)	7 February 2009
2007/08	4.85	Halle (GER)	1 March 2008

== Achievements ==
Year	Competition	Venue	Position	Event	Measure	Notes
2010	World Junior Championships	(Canada) Moncton	2nd	Pole vault	5.40 m	PB
2011	European U23 Championships	(Czech Republic) Ostrava	4th	Pole vault	5.55 m	PB
2012	European Championships	(Finland) Helsinki	8th	Pole vault	5.40 m	PB (Note: 5.55 m in qualification.)
2013	European U23 Championships	(Finland) Tampere	7th	Pole vault	5.30 m	
2018	European Championships	(Germany) Berlin	11th	Pole vault	5.50 m	
2019	European Indoor Championships	(United Kingdom) Glasgow	4th	Pole vault	5.65 m	(Note: He jumped a better measure, 5.70 in qualification round.)
2019	World Championships	(Qatar) Doha	8th	Pole vault	5.70 m	(Note: He jumped a better measure, 5.75 in qualification round.)
2023	European Indoor Championships	(Turkey) Istanbul	6th	Pole vault	5.70 m	

== National titles ==
- Italian Athletics Championships
  - Pole vault: 2012, 2013, 2015, 2018
- Italian Indoor Athletics Championships
  - Pole vault: 2012, 2018

== See also ==
- Italian all-time lists - Pole vault
