= Rasmus Wejnold Jørgensen =

Danish pole vaulter

Personal information
- Nationality: Danish
- Born: 23 January 1989 (age 37) Copenhagen
- Height: 1.80 m (5 ft 11 in)
- Weight: 75 kg (165 lb)

Sport
- Club: Sparta

Achievements and titles
- Personal best: Pole vault: 5.65 m
Medal record
Men's athletics
Representing Denmark

Rasmus Wejnold Jørgensen (born 23 January 1989 in Copenhagen) is a Danish pole vaulter.

His personal best jump is 5.65 metres, achieved in Kaunas on 23 June 2013, while winning the final of 2013 European Team Championships. In 2012, he was finalist at the European Championships, with 5.50 m. He established the National Junior Record with 5.40 during the 2010 European Team Championships.

== Competition record ==
| Year | Competition | Venue | Position | Notes |
Representing Denmark
