= Athletics at the 1993 SEA Games =

- Venue: National Stadium
- Date: 13–17 June 1993
- Nations: 10

Athletics events at the 1993 SEA Games were held between 13–17 June in Singapore.

== Medal table ==
* Host nation (Singapore)

| Rank | Nation | Gold | Silver | Bronze | Total |
|---|---|---|---|---|---|
| 1 | Malaysia (MAS) | 14 | 6 | 7 | 27 |
| 2 | Indonesia (INA) | 13 | 11 | 7 | 31 |
| 3 | Thailand (THA) | 8 | 11 | 7 | 26 |
| 4 | Philippines (PHI) | 6 | 6 | 10 | 22 |
| 5 | Myanmar (MYA) | 2 | 7 | 2 | 11 |
| 6 | Singapore (SIN)* | 1 | 3 | 8 | 12 |
| 7 | Vietnam (VIE) | 0 | 0 | 3 | 3 |
| Totals (7 entries) | | 44 | 44 | 44 | 132 |

== Medal summary ==
=== Men ===
| Event | Gold | | Silver | | Bronze | |
|---|---|---|---|---|---|---|
| 100 metres Wind: -0.9 m/s | Mardi Lestari; Indonesia | 10.46 | Khadik Juntasi; Indonesia | 10.52 | Niti Piyapan; Thailand | 10.56 |
| 200 metres | Niti Piyapan; Thailand | 20.93 GR | Hamkah Afik; Singapore | 21.34 | Ernawan Witarsa; Indonesia | 21.44 |
| 400 metres | Elieser Wattebosi; Indonesia | 46.37 NR | Yutthana Thonglek; Thailand | 46.68 | Mohd Yazid Parlan; Malaysia | 47.50 |
| 800 metres | Ramu Thangavelu; Malaysia | 1:51.81 | Alexander Resmol; Indonesia | 1:52.07 | Tun Win Thein; Myanmar | 1:52.22 |
| 1500 metres | Parluatan Siregar; Indonesia | 3:47.28 GR | Shwe Aung; Myanmar | 3:47.83 | Hector Begeo; Philippines | 3:49.00 |
| 5000 metres | Munusamy Ramachandran; Malaysia | 14:08.97 GR | Gopal Thein Win; Myanmar | 14:20.93 | Subeno; Indonesia | 14:24.20 |
| 10000 metres | Munusamy Ramachandran; Malaysia | 30:05.09 GR | Gopal Thein Win; Myanmar | 30:08.56 | Osias Kamlase; Indonesia | 30:21.12 |
| 110 m hurdles | Nur Herman Majid; Malaysia | 14.45 | Anekpol Mongkoldech; Thailand | 14.52 | Nguyễn Văn Lợi; Vietnam | 14.88 |
| 400 m hurdles | Chanon Keanchan; Thailand | 50.54 GR | Sakorn Tongtip; Thailand | 51.24 | Herman Balagaize; Indonesia | 51.57 |
| 3000 m steeplechase | Parluatan Siregar; Indonesia | 9:08.87 | Hector Begeo; Philippines | 9:10.55 | Ramu Thangavelu; Malaysia | 9:23.41 |
| 4 × 100 metres relay | Thailand (THA); Niti Piyapan; Pongsak Watcharakup; Worasit Vechaphut; Kriengkrai Narom | 39.61 | Indonesia (INA); Antonius; Khadik Juntasi; Mardi Lestari; Ernawan Witarsa | 39.63 | Singapore (SGP) | 40.35 |
| 4 × 400 metres relay | Thailand (THA); Chanon Keanchan; Sakorn Tongtip; Yuthana Thonglek; Wirwat Poomipak | 3:07.30 | Indonesia (INA); Herman Balagaize; Don Bosko Maturani; Novi Persulessy; Elieser Wattebosi | 3:09.54 NR | Malaysia (MAS); Azhar Hashim; Yazid Parlan; Suhairi Salem; Patrick Khoo | 3:10.19 |
| Marathon | Naek Sagala; Indonesia | 2:24.37 | Indro Sowarno Wanidi; Indonesia | 2:28.20 | Jiratikarn Boonma; Thailand | 2:30.50 |
| 10 km walk | Tun Tin; Myanmar | 47:01.8 | P. Ravindran; Malaysia | 47:16.7 | Tan Kheik Tiong; Singapore | 49:29.0 |
| 20 km walk | P. Ravindran; Malaysia | 1:38:36 | Tun Tin; Myanmar | 1:41:46 | Ricky Khoo Ching Mong; Singapore | 1:42:52 |
| High jump | Lou Cwee Peng; Malaysia | 2.21 m | Pornsak Playyod; Thailand | 2.17 | Loo Kum Zee; Malaysia | 2.13 m |
| Pole vault | Edward Lasquete; Philippines | 4.85 m GR | Emerson Obiena; Philippines | 4.50 m | Mok Hay Foo; Singapore | 4.50 m |
| Long jump | Mohd Zaki Sadri; Malaysia | 7.77 m GR | Agus Riza Irawan; Indonesia | 7.67 m | Yuttapong Homehong; Thailand | 7.31 m |
| Triple jump | Mohd Zaki Sadri; Malaysia | 16.27 m | Sidik Sahak; Malaysia | 15.91 m | Sangvorn Thaveechalermdit; Thailand | 15.71 m |
| Shot put | Arjan Singh; Malaysia | 15.72 m | Bruce Ventura; Philippines | 15.69 m | Bancha Supanroj; Thailand | 15.54 m |
| Discus throw | James Wong Tuck Yim; Singapore | 49.02 m | Adul Kerdsri; Thailand | 46.60 m | Fidel Repizo; Philippines | 45.68 m |
| Hammer throw | Wong Tee Kue; Malaysia | 58.50 m | James Wong Tuck Yim; Singapore | 52.86 m | Augustin Jarina, Jr. Philippines | 50.02 m |
| Javelin throw | Frederikus Mahuse; Indonesia | 72.50 m | Mohd Yazid Imran; Malaysia | 70.60 m | Timotius Ndiken; Indonesia | 70.14 |
| Decathlon | Julius Uwe; Indonesia | 7013 pts NR | Timotius Ndiken; Indonesia | 7009 pts | Leonardo Obligado; Philippines | 6195 pts |

=== Women ===
| Event | Gold | | Silver | | Bronze | |
|---|---|---|---|---|---|---|
| 100 metres Wind: -0.6 m/s | Lydia de Vega; Philippines | 11.60 | Shanti Govindasamy; Malaysia | 11.75 | Rhoda Sinoro; Philippines | 12.14 |
| 200 metres | Lydia de Vega; Philippines | 23.37 GR | Shanti Govindasamy; Malaysia | 23.56 | Dokjun Dokduang; Thailand | 24.06 |
| 400 metres | Noodang Pimpol; Thailand | 52.60 | Rabia Abdul Salam; Malaysia | 52.73 | Saleerat Srimek; Thailand | 54.47 |
| 800 metres | Esther Sumah Suwadi; Indonesia | 2:06.11 | Sukanya Sang-Nguen; Thailand | 2:08.21 | Marietta Tabangan; Philippines | 2:08.72 |
| 1500 metres | Marietta Tabangan; Philippines | 4:29.69 | Esther Sumah Suwadi; Indonesia | 4:32.09 | Palaniappan Jayanthi; Malaysia | 4:32.46 |
| 3000 metres | Palaniappan Jayanthi; Malaysia | 9:27.62 | Pa Pa; Myanmar | 9:47.62 | Suryati Marija; Indonesia | 9:51.43 |
| 10000 metres | Palaniappan Jayanthi; Malaysia | 35:37.21 | Pa Pa; Myanmar | 37:28.74 | Toh Soh Liang; Singapore | 38:41.56 |
| Marathon | Suryati Marija; Indonesia | 2:50:58 | Toh Soh Liang; Singapore | 2:58:02 | Maria Lawalata; Indonesia | 3:04:37 |
| 100 m hurdles Wind: +0.6 m/s | Martini Kustiah; Indonesia | 13.93 | Elma Muros; Philippines | 14.00 | Vũ Bích Hường; Vietnam | 14.13 |
| 400 m hurdles | Elma Muros; Philippines | 58.65 | Saleerat Srimek; Thailand | 1:01.41 | Nene Pellosis; Philippines | 1:01.53 |
| 4 × 100 metres relay | Thailand (THA); Naparat Suajongprue; Ratjai Siripet; Dokjun Dokduang; Savitree Srichure | 44.65 GR | Philippines (PHI); Elena Ganosa; Lydia de Vega; Elma Muros; Rhoda Sinoro | 45.50 | Malaysia (MAS) | 45.70 |
| 4 × 400 metres relay | Malaysia (MAS); Shanti Ramachandran; Josephine Mary Singarayar; Shanti Govindasamy; Rabia Abdul Salam | 3:35.83 | Thailand (THA); Srirat Chimrak; Sukanya Sang-Nguen; Saleerat Srimek; Noodang Pimpol | 3:36.48 | Philippines (PHI); Elma Muros; Nene Pellosis; Perla Balatucan; Elena Ganosa | 3:53.35 |
| 5 km walk | Hasiati Lawole; Indonesia | 26:12.94 | Kyin Lwan; Myanmar | 26:29.87 | Helen Low; Singapore | 26:32.89 |
| 10 km walk | Cheng Tong Lean; Malaysia | 52:59 | Hasiati Lawole; Indonesia | 53:31 | Helen Low; Singapore | 54:20 |
| High jump | Jaruwan Jenjudkarn; Thailand | 1.80 m | Rassamee Taemsri; Thailand | 1.80 m | Vũ Mỹ Hạnh; Vietnam | 1.76 m |
| Long jump | Elma Muros; Philippines | 6.44 m | Rabbaiya; Indonesia | 6.22 m | Nor Aishah Ismail; Malaysia | 5.93 m |
| Shot put | Sunisa Yooyao; Thailand | 14.42 m | Junitha Sandra Paomey; Indonesia | 13.62 m | Aye Aye Nwe; Myanmar | 13.40 m |
| Discus throw | Aye Aye Nwe; Myanmar | 49.92 m GR | Sunisa Yooyao; Thailand | 46.62 m | Dorie Cortejo; Philippines | 42.30 m |
| Javelin throw | Taty Ratnaningsih; Indonesia | 46.14 m | Sukon Piromkhory; Thailand | 44.84 m | Erlinda Lavandia; Philippines | 44.00 m |
| Heptathlon | Rumini; Indonesia | 5204 pts | Elma Muros; Philippines | 5132 pts | Yu Long Nyu; Singapore | 5116 pts |
