= List of Cambodian records in athletics =

The following are the national records in athletics in Cambodia maintained by Cambodia's national athletics federation: Khmer Amateur Athletics Federation (KAAF).

== Outdoor ==
Key to tables: Awaiting ratification Record not kept by KAAF Not ratified or later rescinded KAAF

=== Men ===
Event	Record	Athlete	Date	Meet	Place	Ref.
100 m	10.75 (+1.2 m/s)	Pin Wanheab	25 July 2014	Swiss Championships	Frauenfeld, Switzerland	
100 m	10.67 NWI	Pen Sokong	27 November 2020		Phnom Penh, Cambodia	
200 m	21.85 (+0.1 m/s)	Pin Wanheab	30 June 2012		Nottwil, Switzerland	
400 m	48.82	Chhem Savin	3 September 1972	Olympic Games	Munich, West Germany	
400 m	47.5 h	Chhem Savin	4 August 1967		Phnom Penh, Cambodia	
800 m	1:50.09	Chhun Bunthorn	15 July 2023	Asian Championships	Bangkok, Thailand	
1500 m	4:01.8 h	Nhea Khay	16 December 1965		Kuala Lumpur, Malaysia	
1500 m	3:59.97	Chhun Bunthorn	30 September 2023	Asian Games	Hangzhou, China	
3000 m	9:59.54	Samphors Soum	6 June 2009		Ho Chi Minh City, Vietnam	
5000 m	14:24.71	Hem Bunting	7 December 2007	Southeast Asian Games	Nakhon Ratchasima, Thailand	
5 km (road)	16:13+	Hem Bunting	15 April 2012	Paris Marathon	Paris, France	
10,000 m	32:52.13	Pheara Vann	30 September 2023	Asian Games	Hangzhou, China	
10 km (road)	32:33+	Hem Bunting	15 April 2012	Paris Marathon	Paris, France	
15 km (road)	48:59+	Hem Bunting	15 April 2012	Paris Marathon	Paris, France	
Half marathon	1:09:04+	Hem Bunting	15 April 2012	Paris Marathon	Paris, France	
25 km (road)	1:22:08+	Hem Bunting	15 April 2012	Paris Marathon	Paris, France	
30 km (road)	1:38:50+	Hem Bunting	15 April 2012	Paris Marathon	Paris, France	
Marathon	2:23:29	Hem Bunting	15 April 2012	Paris Marathon	Paris, France	
110 m hurdles	15.79	Pech Iev	26 August 1962	Asian Games	Jakarta, Indonesia	
400 m hurdles	56.42	Luk Khin	25 August 1962	Asian Games	Jakarta, Indonesia	
3000 m steeplechase	10:05.0	Nhea Khay	14 November 1963		Jakarta, Indonesia	
High jump	2.03 m	Sin Sitha	5 August 1972		Aachen, West Germany	
Pole vault	3.90 m	Péou Chin	18 July 1968		Phnom Penh, Cambodia	
Long jump	7.40 m	Proch Buntol	26 November 1966		Phnom Penh, Cambodia	
Triple jump	14.85 m	Sao Mean	29 November 1966		Phnom Penh, Cambodia	
Shot put	14.65 m	Sim Samedy	9 May 2023	Southeast Asian Games	Phnom Penh, Cambodia	
Discus throw	45.90 m	Nhem Yeav	16 August 1969		Phnom Penh, Cambodia	
Hammer throw	45.38 m	Chun Sin San	17 August 1969		Phnom Penh, Cambodia	
Hammer throw	51.82 m	Pang Chamroeun Vithiear	6 May 2023	Southeast Asian Games	Phnom Penh, Cambodia	
Javelin throw	42.30 m	Chorn Kompeak	25–30 October 2016		Phnom Penh, Cambodia	
Javelin throw	47.80 m	Touch Phoeurn	6 May 2023	Southeast Asian Games	Phnom Penh, Cambodia	
Decathlon	6156 pts	Chai Kim San	14–15 December 1971	Southeast Asian Peninsular Games	Kuala Lumpur, Malaysia	
Decathlon	100m / Long jump / Shot put / High jump / 400m / 110m H / Discus / Pole vault / Javelin / 1500m; 11.33 / 5.80 m / 11.72 m / 1.70 m / 52.73 / 16.07 / 35.12 m / 3.22 m / 63.30 m / 5:09.4 h					
Decathlon	6320 pts	Chai Kim San	16–17 August 1973		Phnom Penh, Cambodia	
Decathlon	100m / Long jump / Shot put / High jump / 400m / 110m H / Discus / Pole vault / Javelin / 1500m					
20 km walk (road)	1:54:31	Siravut Sinn	6 May 2006		Havana, Cuba	
50 km walk (road)						
4 × 100 m relay	41.8 h	Cambodia	18 July 1968		Phnom Penh, Cambodia	
4 × 100 m relay	41.24	Cambodia	16 May 2022	Southeast Asian Games	Hanoi, Vietnam	
4 × 400 m relay	3:18.10	Khmer Republic; Mao Samphon; Chhem Savin; S. Soeun; Kong Saran	5 September 1973	Southeast Asian Peninsular Games	Singapore	

=== Women ===
Event	Record	Athlete	Date	Meet	Place	Ref.
100 m	12.72	Meas Kheng	1 September 1972	Olympic Games	Munich, West Germany	
100 m	12.39 NWI	Sang Lida	12 May 2023	Southeast Asian Games	Phnom Penh, Cambodia	
200 m	25.05	Meas Kheng	14 December 1971	Southeast Asian Peninsular Games	Kuala Lumpur, Malaysia	
400 m	1:03.56	Seyha Chan	17 June 2011	6th ASEAN Junior Championships	Jakarta, Indonesia	
800 m	2:17.86	Sem Sophalnara	7 June 1987		Moscow, Soviet Union	
1500 m	5:12.9	Sem Sophalnara	3 June 1989		Riga, Soviet Union	
3000 m	11:43.8	Sem Sophalnara	25 October 1986		Ho Chi Minh City, Vietnam	
5000 m	20:02.90	Mey Jou Heng	14 July 2016	ASEAN University Games	Singapore, Singapore	
5 km (road)	18:59	Thong Chanthey (Note: citizenship unclear)	5 October 2025	15ª Volta Peu de les Falles	Valencia, Spain	
10,000 m	43:45.92	Mey Jou Heng	16 July 2016	ASEAN University Games	Singapore, Singapore	
10,000 m	41:11.57	Ling Rachna	12 May 2023	Southeast Asian Games	Phnom Penh, Cambodia	
Half marathon	1:32:32	Nary Ly	5 December 2010	Angkor Wat International Half Marathon	Siem Reap, Cambodia	
Marathon	2:59:42	Nary Ly	15 November 2015	Valencia Marathon	Valencia, Spain	
100 m hurdles	17.9 h	Khong Yoem	30 May 1969		Phnom Penh, Cambodia	
100 m hurdles	17.9 h	Kim Mom	12 December 1970	Asian Games	Bangkok, Thailand	
400 m hurdles						
3000 m steeplechase						
High jump	1.53 m	Our Kim Leang	19 July 1968		Phnom Penh, Cambodia	
Pole vault	2.81 m	Helene Kong	27 June 2007		Forbach, France	
Pole vault	3.65 m	Helene Kong	18 July 2010		Niort, France	
Long jump	5.85 m	Kim Mom	19 July 1968		Phnom Penh, Cambodia	
Triple jump	9.48 m (+0.9 m/s)	Sokunthea Kuen	10 June 2007		Singapore	
Shot put	11.85 m	Sao Thin	13 July 1967		Phnom Penh, Cambodia	
Discus throw	39.78 m	Uch Lay	16 August 1969		Phnom Penh, Cambodia	
Hammer throw						
Javelin throw						
Heptathlon						
Heptathlon	100m H / High jump / Shot put / 200m / Long jump / Javelin / 800m					
20 km walk (road)						
50 km walk (road)						
4 × 100 m relay	49.8 h	Cambodia; Meas Kheng; Ch. Say; T. Yon; M. Yen	30 November 1966		Phnom Penh, Cambodia	
4 × 100 m relay	49.50	Cambodia; Ben Seyha; Duong Sreypheap; Kan Sreyroth; Pok Pisey	10 May 2023	Southeast Asian Games	Phnom Penh, Cambodia	
4 × 400 m relay	4:18.5	Khmer Republic	17 August 1973		Phnom Penh, Khmer Republic	

== Indoor ==
=== Men ===
Event	Record	Athlete	Date	Meet	Place	Ref.
50 m	6.07	Pin Wanheab	12 January 2013	Tägimeeting	Wettingen, Switzerland	
60 m	6.87	Pin Wanheab	14 February 2015	Swiss Championships	St. Gallen, Switzerland	
200 m	22.12	Pin Wanheab	17 February 2013	Swiss Championships	Magglingen, Switzerland	
400 m	50.67	Pin Wanheab	15 February 2014	Swiss Championships	Magglingen, Switzerland	
800 m	1:59.14	Kieng Samorn	9 March 2012	World Championships	Istanbul, Turkey	
1500 m	4:06.10	Hem Bunting	11 February 2006	Asian Championships	Pattaya, Thailand	
3000 m	9:02.00	Hem Bunting	11 February 2006	Asian Championships	Pattaya, Thailand	
60 m hurdles						
High jump						
Pole vault						
Long jump	6.53 m	Samnang Khiev	10 February 2006	Asian Championships	Pattaya, Thailand	
Triple jump	10.84 m #	Vannak Keo	22 January 2006		Nice, France	
Shot put						
Heptathlon						
Heptathlon	60m H / High jump / Shot put / Long jump / 800m					
5000 m walk						
4 × 400 m relay						

=== Women ===
Event	Record	Athlete	Date	Meet	Place	Ref.
60 m	8.25	Helene Kong	31 January 2010		Metz, France	
200 m	29.11	Helene Kong	30 November 2008		Vittel, France	
400 m						
800 m						
1500 m						
3000 m						
60 m hurdles						
High jump						
Pole vault	3.56 m	Helene Kong	4 December 2009		Aulnay-sous-Bois, France	
Long jump						
Triple jump						
Shot put						
Pentathlon						
Pentathlon	60m H / High jump / Shot put / Long jump / 800m					
3000 m walk						
4 × 400 m relay						
