= Athletics at the 2015 SEA Games – Men's 1500 metres =

Athletics – Men's 1500 metres at the 2015 SEA Games
- Venue: Nation stadium
- Date: 11 June 2015
- Competitors: 10 from 9 nations

Medalists
gold medal	Duong Van Thai	Vietnam
silver medal	Mervin Guarte	Philippines
bronze medal	Yothin Yaprajan	Thailand

The men's 1500 metres competition of the athletics event at the 2015 SEA Games was held on 11 June at the National Stadium in Singapore.

== Records ==
Prior to this competition, the existing Asian and Games records were as follows:

Asian record	Rashid Ramzi (BHR)	3:29.14	Rome, Italy	14 July 2006
Games record	Cuong Nguyen Dinh (VIE)	3:45.31	Nakhon Ratchasima, Thailand	11 December 2007

== Schedule ==
All times are Singapore Standard Time (UTC+08:00)

Date	Time	Event
Saturday, 11 June 2015	16:35	Final

== Results ==
=== Final ===
Source: Result Final

Rank	Athlete	Time	Notes	
1st place, gold medalist(s)	Duong Van Thai (VIE)	3:47.04	PB	Video on YouTube Official Video
2nd place, silver medalist(s)	Mervin Guarte (PHI)	3:48.06	SB	Video on YouTube Official Video
3rd place, bronze medalist(s)	Yothin Yaprajan (THA)	3:49.35	PB	Video on YouTube Official Video
4	Ridwan (INA)	3:49.95	SB	Video on YouTube Official Video
5	Maung Chet (MYA)	3:54.15	SB	Video on YouTube Official Video
6	Ahmad Luth Hamizan (MAS)	3:56.08	PB	Video on YouTube Official Video
7	Raviin Muthu Kumar (SIN)	3:56.96	PB	Video on YouTube Official Video
8	Fang Jianyong (SIN)	4:00.33	PB	Video on YouTube Official Video
9	Kieng Samorn (CAM)	4:03.62		
10	Ribeiro Pinto Carvalho (TLS)	4:12.29	SB	

== See also ==
- Official website
