= Athletics at the 2015 SEA Games – Men's 800 metres =

Athletics – Men's 800 metres at the 2015 SEA Games
- Venue: Nation stadium
- Date: 10 June 2015
- Competitors: 10 from 7 nations

Medalists
gold medal	Duong Van Thai	Vietnam
silver medal	Mervin Guarte	Philippines
bronze medal	Yothin Yaprajan	Thailand

The men's 800 metres competition of the athletics event at the 2015 SEA Games was held on 10 June at the National Stadium in Singapore.

== Records ==
Prior to this competition, the existing Asian and Games records were as follows:

Asian record	Yusuf Saad Kamel (BHR)	1:42.79	Monaco	29 July 2008
Games record	Samson Vellabouy (MAS)	1:48.29	Kuala Lumpur, Malaysia	14 August 1989

== Schedule ==
All times are Singapore Standard Time (UTC+08:00)

Date	Time	Event
Saturday, 10 June 2015	18:15	Final

== Results ==
=== Final ===
Source: Result Final

Rank	Athlete	Time	Notes	
1st place, gold medalist(s)	Duong Van Thai (VIE)	1:51.43		Video on YouTube Official Video
2nd place, silver medalist(s)	Mervin Guarte (PHI)	1:51.47	SB	Video on YouTube Official Video
3rd place, bronze medalist(s)	Yothin Yaprajan (THA)	1:52.32		Video on YouTube Official Video
4	Kesavan Maniam (MAS)	1:53.30		Video on YouTube Official Video
5	Zachary Ryan Devaraj (SIN)	1:54.35	SB	Video on YouTube Official Video
6	Jirayu Pleenaram (THA)	1:54.36		Video on YouTube Official Video
7	Wenlie Maulas (PHI)	1:54.38		Video on YouTube Official Video
8	Samorn Kieng (CAM)	1:56.26		Video on YouTube Official Video
9	Le Thanh Hung (VIE)	1:58.27		Video on YouTube Official Video
10	Domingos Savio Dos Santos (TLS)	1:58.67	PB	Video on YouTube Official Video

== See also ==
- Official website
