= Emerson Obiena =

Filipino pole vaulter and coach

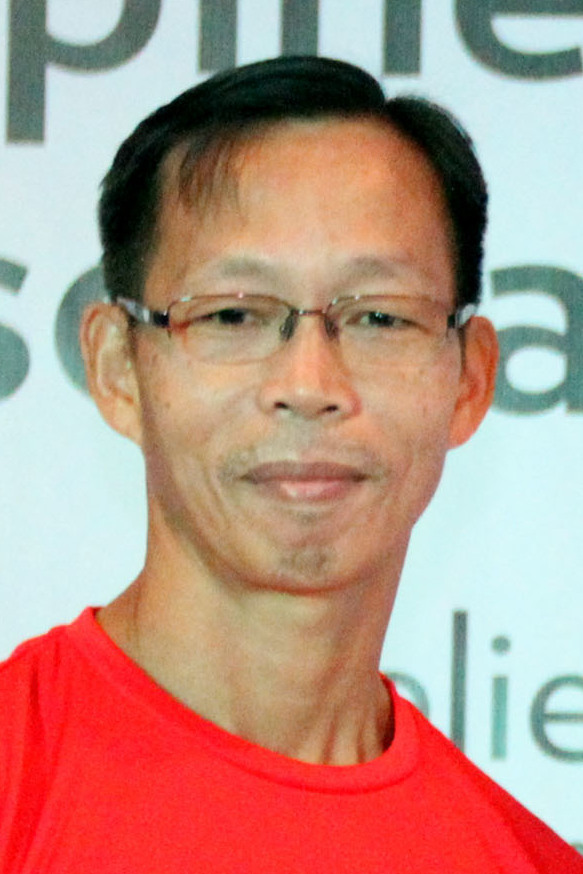
- Obiena in 2019

Personal information
- Nationality: Filipino
- Born: November 4, 1964 (age 61)

Sport
- Country: Philippines
- Sport: Track and field
- Event: Pole vaulting
- Coached by: Vitaly Petrov (2014)
- Now coaching: Ernest Obiena

Achievements and titles
- Personal best(s): 4.95m 4.93m (Indoor)
Medal record
Men's athletics
Representing Philippines
Southeast Asian Games
Silver medal – second place	1993 Singapore	Pole vault
Bronze medal – third place	2005 Manila	Pole vault
Bronze medal – third place	2007 Nakhon Ratchasima	Pole vault

Emerson Obiena is a Filipino pole vaulter and coach. Obiena was silver medalist at the 1993 Southeast Asian Games finishing behind fellow countryman, Edward Lasquete in the pole vault event and at the 1999 Southeast Asian Games. The last medal he won in an international competition was a bronze, which he obtained at the 2007 Southeast Asian Games.

Obiena is a Chinese Filipino, with a Chinese father and a mother with ancestries in Quezon and Samar. He is married to Jeannete Uy, a former hurdler for Centro Escolar University, with whom he had two children: Ernest and Emily, both of whom are pole vaulters.

By 2014, Obiena was serving as the Philippine national coach for pole vaulting. He also serves as his son's coach. In early 2014, for three months, Obiena with his son was given an opportunity to train in Formia, Italy under coach Vitaly Petrov, who also previously coached Sergey Bubka.

Obiena took part at the 22nd Asia Masters Athletics Championships and won gold in the men's pole vault 55-59 division.
