= List of Indonesian records in athletics =

The following are the national records in athletics in Indonesia maintained by its national athletics federation: Persatuan Atletik Seluruh Indonesia (PASI).

== Outdoor ==
Key to tables: Awaiting ratification Record not kept by PASI Not ratified or later rescinded by PASI

=== Men ===
Event	Record	Athlete	Date	Meet	Place	Ref.
100 m	10.03 (+1.7 m/s) (Note: wind measurement by World Athletics source, 0.8 m/s by federation source)	Lalu Muhammad Zohri	19 May 2019	Osaka Grand Prix	Osaka, Japan	
200 m	20.76 (+0.8 m/s)	Suryo Agung Wibowo	11 December 2007	Southeast Asian Games	Nakhon Ratchasima, Thailand	
400 m	46.37	Elieser Wattebosi	14 June 1993	Southeast Asian Games	Singapore	
800 m	1:49.93	Alexander Resmol	12 December 1995	Southeast Asian Games	Chiang Mai. Thailand	
1500 m	3:46.21	Julius Leuwol	24 September 1995	Asian Athletics Championships	Jakarta, Indonesia	
3000 m	8:33.49+	Agus Prayogo	21 November 2010	Asian Games	Guangzhou, China	
5000 m	14:02.12	Agus Prayogo	23 July 2011	Military World Games	Rio de Janeiro, Brazil	
5 km (road)	15:19+	Robi Syianturi	12 July 2024	Gold Coast Half Marathon	Gold Coast, Australia	
10,000 m	29:25.77	Agus Prayogo	26 November 2010	Asian Games	Guangzhou, China	
10 km (road)	29:25	Eduardus Nabunome	20 October 1989	Bali 10K	Denpasar, Indonesia	
15 km (road)	45:32+	Robi Syianturi	26 October 2025	Casablanca Half Marathon	Casablanca, Morocco	
20 km (road)	1:01:35+	Robi Syianturi	12 July 2024	Gold Coast Half Marathon	Gold Coast, Australia	
Half marathon	1:03:24	Robi Syianturi	26 October 2025	Casablanca Half Marathon	Casablanca, Morocco	
25 km (road)	1:18:08+	Robi Syianturi	10 May 2026	Copenhagen Marathon	Copenhagen, Denmark	
30 km (road)	1:33:59+	Robi Syianturi	10 May 2026	Copenhagen Marathon	Copenhagen, Denmark	
Marathon	2:12:20	Robi Syianturi	10 May 2026	Copenhagen Marathon	Copenhagen, Denmark	
110 m hurdles	14.02 (−0.5 m/s)	Rio Maholtra	27 August 2018	Asian Games	Jakarta, Indonesia	
400 m hurdles	50.81	Halomoan Edwin Binsar	10 December 2019	Southeast Asian Games	New Clark City, Philippines	
3000 m steeplechase	8:54.32	Atjong Tio Purwanto	27 August 2018	Asian Games	Jakarta, Indonesia	
High jump	2.16 m	Rafael	13 September 2024	Pekan Olahraga Nasional	Sumatera Utara, Indonesia	
Pole vault	5.31 m	Idan Fauzan Richsan	12 September 2024	Pekan Olahraga Nasional	Sumatera Utara, Indonesia	
Long jump	8.09 m (±0.0 m/s)	Sapwaturrahman	26 August 2018	Asian Games	Jakarta, Indonesia	
Triple jump	16.21 m (−0.2 m/s)	Sapwaturrahman	10 December 2019 (Note: by World Athletics source; 9 December 2019 by PASI source)		New Clark City, Philippines	
Shot put	16.87 m	Sukraj Singh	1 July 1999		Jakarta, Indonesia	
Discus throw	52.95 m	Hermanto Hermanto	1 July 2011	Kejuaraan Nasional Atletik	Jakarta, Indonesia	
Hammer throw	55.96 m	Dudung Suhendi	2 July 2011	Kejuaraan Nasional Atletik	Jakarta, Indonesia	
Javelin throw	75.58 m	Frans Mahuse	22 October 1991	Asian Championships	Kuala Lumpur, Malaysia	
Decathlon	7013 pts (NWI)	Julius Uwe	13–14 June 1993	Southeast Asian Games	Singapore	
Decathlon	100m (wind) / Long jump (wind) / Shot put / High jump / 400m / 110m H (wind) / Discus / Pole vault / Javelin / 1500m; 11.23 (NWI) / 7.00 m (NWI) / 12.22 m / 1.77 m / 50.63 m / 15.66 (NWI) / 41.70 m / 3.90 m / 57.04 m / 4:48.57 m					
5 km walk (road)	21:35+	Hendro	20 March 2016	Asian Race Walking Championships	Nomi, Japan	
10,000 m walk (track)	43:50.9	Rachmad Sumarsono	5 September 1986		Jakarta, Indonesia	
10,000 m walk (track)	43:49.22	Abdul Kadir Indra	2 March 2017		Surabaya, Indonesia	
10 km walk (road)	43:12+	Hendro	20 March 2016	Asian Race Walking Championships	Nomi, Japan	
15 km walk (road)	1:05:11+	Hendro	20 March 2016	Asian Race Walking Championships	Nomi, Japan	
20,000 m walk (track)	1:32:11.27	Hendro	22 August 2017	Southeast Asian Games	Bukit Jalil, Malaysia	
20 km walk (road)	1:27:24	Hendro	20 March 2016	Asian Race Walking Championships	Nomi, Japan	
Half marathon walk (road)	1:37:47	Hendro	26 October 2025	62nd All-Japan Takahata Walking Race	Takahata, Japan	
30 km walk (road)	2:24:33+	Hendro	16 March 2025	Asian Race Walking Championships	Nomi, Japan	
35 km walk (road)	2:49:37	Hendro	16 March 2025	Asian Race Walking Championships	Nomi, Japan	
50 km walk (road)	4:32:32 (Note: by World Athletics source: 4:32:30 by federation source)	Sutrisno	19 May 1997		Lingayen, Philippines	
50 km walk (road)	4:32:20	Hendro	30 August 2018	Asian Games	Jakarta, Indonesia	
4 × 100 m relay	38.77	Indonesia; Mohd Fadlin; Lalu Muhammad Zohri; Eko Rimbawan; Bayu Kertanegara	30 August 2018	Asian Games	Jakarta, Indonesia	
4 × 400 m relay	3:09.54	Indonesia; Novi Persulessy; Elieser Wattebosi; Don Bosco; Herman Balagaise	17 June 1993	Southeast Asian Games	Singapore	

=== Women ===
Event	Record	Athlete	Date	Meet	Place	Ref.
100 m	11.56 (±0.0 m/s)	Irene Truitje Joseph	8 August 1999 (Note: PASI erroneously lists the date as 20 October.)	Southeast Asian Games	Bandar Seri Begawan, Brunei	
100 m	11.53 (−1.2 m/s)	Valentine Vanessa Lonteng	11 January 2023	National Selection Trials	Jakarta, Indonesia	
200 m	23.61 (NWI)	Nella Agustin	13 September 2024	Pekan Olahraga Nasional	Sumatera Utara, Indonesia	
400 m	53.22 (Note: by World Athletics source; 53.21 by PASI source)	Sri Mayasari	12 October 2021		Mimika, Indonesia	
800 m	2:06.11	Esther Sumah	16 June 1993	Southeast Asian Games	Singapore	
1500 m	4:18.69	Rini Budiarti	9 August 2007	Universiade	Bangkok, Thailand	
3000 m	9:30.17	Supriati Sutono	8 June 1998		Manila, Philippines	
5000 m	15:54.32	Triyaningsih	8 December 2007	Southeast Asian Games	Nakhon Ratchasima, Thailand	
5 km (road)	16:24	Triyaningsih	18 May 2008	Indonesian 5 km Road Running Championships	Jakarta, Indonesia	
10,000 m	32:49.47	Triyaningsih	17 December 2009	Southeast Asian Games	Vientiane, Laos	
10 km (road)	33:23	Triyaningsih	10 August 2008		Denpasar, Indonesia	
Half marathon	1:13:01+	Triyaningsih	27 November 2010	Asian Games	Guangzhou, China	
30 km (road)	1:45:03+	Triyaningsih	27 November 2010	Asian Games	Guangzhou, China	
Marathon	2:31:49	Triyaningsih	27 November 2010	Asian Games	Guangzhou, China	
100 m hurdles	13.16 (NWI)	Dina Aulia	12 September 2024	Pekan Olahraga Nasional	Sumatera Utara, Indonesia	
400 m hurdles	58.30	Nella Agustin	16 September 2024	Pekan Olahraga Nasional	Sumatera Utara, Indonesia	
3000 m steeplechase	9:49.46	Rini Budiarti	27 September 2014	Asian Games	Incheon, South Korea	
High jump	1.79 m	Nadia Anggraini	28 April 2016	78th Singapore Open Championships	Singapore	
Pole vault	4.20 m	Diva Renata Jayadi	18 September 2024	Pekan Olahraga Nasional	Sumatera Utara, Indonesia	
Long jump	6.70 m (±0.0 m/s)	Maria Natalia Londa	10 June 2015	Southeast Asian Games	Kallang, Singapore	
Triple jump	14.17 m (−0.7 m/s)	Maria Natalia Londa	17 December 2013	Southeast Asian Games	Naypyidaw, Myanmar	
Shot put	15.54 m	Eki Febri Ekawati	24 April 2017	Asian Grand Prix	Jinhua, China	
Shot put	15.60 m	Eki Febri Ekawati	8 December 2017	Indonesian Championships	Jakarta, Indonesia	
Discus throw	50.68 m	Dwi Ratnawati	27 April 2008		Bangkok, Thailand	
Hammer throw	54.12 m	Rose Herlinda Inggriana	15 December 2009	Southeast Asian Games	Vientiane, Laos	
Javelin throw	52.56 m	Atinna Nurkamilla	13 September 2024	Pekan Olahraga Nasional	Sumatera Utara, Indonesia	
Heptathlon	5386 pts	Emilia Nova	24–25 August 2017	Southeast Asian Games	Bukit Jalil, Malaysia	
Heptathlon	100m H (wind) / High jump / Shot put / 200m (wind) / Long jump (wind) / Javelin / 800m; 13.58 (−0.2 m/s) / 1.62 m / 10.84 m / 25.02 (±0.0 m/s) / 5.75 m (±0.0 m/s) / 35.10 m / 2:24.03					
10,000 m walk (track)	47:26.84	Tersiana Riwu Rohi	23 August 1997		Jakarta, Indonesia	
10 km walk (road)	49:05	Hasiati Lawole	27 February 1997		Melbourne, Australia	
20 km walk (road)	1:40:25	Tersiana Riwu Rohi	15 July 2003	Indonesian Race Walking Championships	Jakarta, Indonesia	
20 km walk (road)	1:39:05	Darwati	29 July 2009	Indonesian Championships	Jakarta, Indonesia	
35 km walk (road)	3:28:30	Violine Intan Puspita	4 October 2023	Asian Games	Hangzhou, China	
4 × 100 m relay	45.00	Indonesia; Nurul Imaniar; Tri Setyo Utami; Serafi Anelies Unani; Dedeh Erawati	15 November 2011	Southeast Asian Games	Palembang, Indonesia	
4 × 400 m relay	3:42.25	Indonesia; Henny Maspaitella; Indah Wahjuni; Martha Lekransy; Emma Tahapary	29 September 1985	Asian Championships	Jakarta, Indonesia	

=== Mixed ===
Event	Record	Athlete	Date	Meet	Place	Ref.
4 × 400 m relay	3:28.45	Nella Agustin; Siska Simamora; M. Kahairuddin Syahputra; Ayyub Niti Raharja	17 September 2024	XXI Pekan Olahraga Nasional	Deli Serdang, Indonesia	

== Indoor ==
=== Men ===
Event	Record	Athlete	Date	Meet	Place	Ref.
60 m	6.58	Lalu Muhammad Zohri	19 March 2022	World Championships	Belgrade, Serbia	
200 m	21.58	Mohamed Purnomo	19 January 1985	World Indoor Games	Paris, France	
400 m	49.86	Yan Karubaba	7 February 2004	Asian Championships	Tehran, Iran	
800 m	1:59.24	Edwin Pattileamonia	13 November 2005	Asian Indoor Games	Pattaya, Thailand	
1500 m						
3000 m	8:58.64	Muhammad Al Quraisy	19 February 2012	Asian Championships	Hangzhou, China	
60 m hurdles	7.98	Rio Maholtra	3 March 2018	World Championships	Birmingham, United Kingdom	
High jump	2.00 m	Syahrial	30 October 2007	Asian Indoor Games	Macau	
High jump	2.00 m	Dwiky Firmansyah	6 February 2026	Asian Championships	Tianjin, China	
Pole vault						
Long jump	6.95 m	Asril Abdullah	1 November 2009	Asian Indoor Games	Hanoi, Vietnam	
Long jump	6.95 m	Noval Kurniawan	15 February 2014	Asian Championships	Hangzhou, China	
Triple jump						
Shot put						
Heptathlon						
Heptathlon	60m / Long jump / Shot put / High jump / 60m H / Pole vault / 1000m					
5000 m walk						
4 × 400 m relay						

=== Women ===
Event	Record	Athlete	Date	Meet	Place	Ref.
60 m	7.36	Valentin Vanesa Lonteng	10 February 2023	Asian Championships	Astana, Kazakhstan	
200 m	26.69	Yulia Novita	6 March 2004	World Championships	Budapest, Hungary	
400 m	54.88	Sri Maya Sari	11 February 2023	Asian Championships	Astana, Kazakhstan	
800 m	2:15.44	Ilang Lismawati	16 February 2014	Asian Championships	Hangzhou, China	
1500 m	4:44.83	Rini Budiarti	25 September 2005	Women's Islamic Games	Tehran, Iran	
3000 m	9:49.75	Rini Budiarti	11 February 2006	Asian Championships	Pattaya, Thailand	
60 m hurdles	8.24	Dina Aulia	12 February 2023	Asian Championships	Astana, Kazakhstan	
High jump						
Pole vault	4.00 m	Ni Putu Desi Margawati	31 October 2009	Asian Indoor Games	Hanoi, Vietnam	
Long jump	6.18 m	Maria Natalia Londa	16 February 2014	Asian Championships	Hangzhou, China	
Triple jump	13.04 m	Maria Natalia Londa	1 November 2009	Asian Indoor Games	Hanoi, Vietnam	
Shot put	15.44 m	Eki Febri Ekawati	11 February 2023	Asian Championships	Astana, Kazakhstan	
Pentathlon						
Pentathlon	60m H / High jump / Shot put / Long jump / 800m					
3000 m walk						
4 × 400 m relay						
