= Athletics at the 2023 SEA Games – Men's Results =

The athletics competitions at the 2023 SEA Games in the Cambodia took place between 6 and 12 May 2023. Track and field events took place at the Morodok Techo National Stadium in Phnom Penh while the marathon and 20 km walk events took place at Angkor Wat.

The 2023 Games featured competitions in 22 events.

== 100 metre ==
Athletics – Men's 100 metre at the 2023 SEA Games
- Venue: Morodok Techo National Stadium
- Date: 12 May 2023
- Competitors: 17 from 10 nations

Medalists
gold medal	Soraoat Dabbang	Thailand
silver medal	Marc Brian Louis	Singapore
bronze medal	Muhammad Haiqal Hanafi	Malaysia

=== Records ===
Prior to this competition, the existing Asian and SEA Games records were as follows:

AR	Su Bingtian (CHN)	9.83	Tokyo, Japan	1 August 2021
GR	Suryo Agung Wibowo (INA)	10.17	Vientiane, Laos	13 December 2009

=== Results ===
Heat 1

Rank	Athlete	Time	Notes
1	Muhammad Haiqal Hanafi (MAS)	10.47	Q
2	Soraoat Dapbang (THA)	10.50	Q
3	Wahyu Setiawan (INA)	10.66	
4	Muhd Noor Firdaus Ar-Rasyid (BRU)	10.81	
5	Noeb Chanyourong (CAM)	10.86	
6	Xaidavanh Vongsavanh (LAO)	10.87	

Heat 2

Rank	Athlete	Time	Notes
1	Khairul Hafiz Jantan (MAS)	10.37	Q
2	Ngần Ngọc Nghĩa (VIE)	10.47	Q
3	Marc Brian Louis (SGP)	10.52	q
4	Lalu Muhammad Zohri (INA)	10.56	q
5	Anfernee Lopena (PHI)	10.86	
6	Sorsy Phomphakdi (LAO)	10.91	

Heat 3

Rank	Athlete	Time	Notes
1	Pen Sokong (CAM)	10.80	Q
2	Joshua Hanwei Chua (SGP)	10.93	Q
3	Abdul Hakeem Ismail (BRU)	11.25	
—	Puripol Boonson (THA)	—	DNS
—	Lwin Moe (MYA)	—	DNS

Finals

Rank	Athlete	Time	Notes
1st place, gold medalist(s)	Soraoat Dabbang (THA)	10.37	
2nd place, silver medalist(s)	Marc Brian Louis (SGP)	10.39	
3rd place, bronze medalist(s)	Muhammad Haiqal Hanafi (MAS)	10.443	
4	Khairul Hafiz Jantan (MAS)	10.448	
5	Ngần Ngọc Nghĩa (VIE)	10.46	
6	Joshua Hanwei Chua (SGP)	10.78	
7	Pen Sokong (CAM)	10.80	
—	Lalu Muhammad Zohri (INA)	—	DNS

== 200 metre ==
Athletics – Men's 200 metre at the 2023 SEA Games
- Venue: Morodok Techo National Stadium
- Date: 8 May 2023
- Competitors: 14 from 9 nations

Medalists
gold medal	Soraoat Dabbang	Thailand
silver medal	Ngần Ngọc Nghĩa	Vietnam
bronze medal	Lalu Muhammad Zohri	Indonesia

=== Records ===
Prior to this competition, the existing Asian and SEA Games records were as follows:

AR	Xie Zhenye (CHN)	19.88	London, United Kingdom	21 July 2019
GR	Puripol Boonson (THA)	20.37	Hanoi, Vietnam	14 May 2022

=== Results ===
Heat 1

Rank	Athlete	Time	Notes
1	Soraoat Dabbang (THA)	20.74	Q
2	Ngần Ngọc Nghĩa (VIE)	20.85	Q
3	Arsyad Saat (MAS)	21.26	Q
4	Bayu Kertanegara (INA)	21.32	Q
5	Kongkham Kheuabmavong (LAO)	22.28	
6	Tort Salin (CAM)	22.68	
7	Abdul Hakeem Ismail (BRU)	23.02	

Heat 2

Rank	Athlete	Time	Notes
1	Puripol Boonson (THA)	21.09	Q
2	Lalu Muhammad Zohri (INA)	21.13	Q
3	Jonathan Nyepa (MAS)	21.44	Q
4	Mark Lee Ren (SGP)	21.44	Q
5	Muhd Noor Firdaus Ar-Rasyid (BRU)	21.65	
6	Sorsy Phomphakdi (LAO)	21.92	NR
7	Anfernee Lopena (PHI)	22.10	

Finals

Rank	Athlete	Time	Notes
1st place, gold medalist(s)	Soraoat Dabbang (THA)	20.62	
2nd place, silver medalist(s)	Ngần Ngọc Nghĩa (VIE)	20.84	
3rd place, bronze medalist(s)	Lalu Muhammad Zohri (INA)	21.02	
4	Jonathan Nyepa (MAS)	21.31	
5	Mark Lee Ren (SGP)	21.48	
6	Bayu Kertanegara (INA)	21.58	
—	Puripol Boonson (THA)	—	DNF
—	Arsyad Saat (MAS)	—	DNS

== 400 metre ==
Athletics – Men's 400 metre at the 2023 SEA Games
- Venue: Morodok Techo National Stadium
- Date: 9 May 2023
- Competitors: 14 from 7 nations

Medalists
gold medal	Umar Osman	Malaysia
silver medal	Umajesty Williams	Philippines
bronze medal	Frederick Ramirez	Philippines

=== Records ===
Prior to this competition, the existing Asian and SEA Games records were as follows:

AR	Yousef Ahmed Masrahi (KSA)	43.93	Beijing, China	23 August 2015
GR	Kunanon Sukkaew (THA)	46.00	Kallang, Singapore	12 June 2015

=== Results ===
Heat 1

Rank	Athlete	Time	Notes
1	Umajesty Williams (PHI)	47.40	Q
2	Trần Nhật Hoàng (VIE)	47.68	Q
3	Abdul Wafiy Roslan (MAS)	47.76	Q
4	Lakki Yuyamadu (THA)	48.02	Q
5	Zubin Muncherji (SGP)	48.26	
6	Yatpitou Chantivea (CAM)	49.76	
7	Deuanpheng Xayyapheat (LAO)	50.46	

Heat 2

Rank	Athlete	Time	Notes
1	Umar Osman (MAS)	47.11	Q
2	Frederick Ramirez (PHI)	47.12	Q
3	Joshua Robert Atkinson (THA)	47.17	Q
4	Dinh Son Tran (VIE)	47.43	q
5	Thana Rajan Thriuben (SGP)	47.48	q
6	Lai Piseth (CAM)	58.45	

Finals

Rank	Athlete	Time	Notes
1st place, gold medalist(s)	Umar Osman (MAS)	46.34	NR
2nd place, silver medalist(s)	Umajesty Williams (PHI)	46.52	
3rd place, bronze medalist(s)	Frederick Ramirez (PHI)	46.63	
4	Joshua Robert Atkinson (THA)	46.90	
5	Thana Rajan Thriuben (SGP)	47.90	
6	Trần Nhật Hoàng (VIE)	48.26	
7	Abdul Wafiy Roslan (MAS)	49.17	
8	Dinh Son Tran (VIE)	1:01.20	

== 800 metre ==
Athletics – Men's 800 metre at the 2023 SEA Games
- Date: 10 May 2023 (Heats); 11 May 2023 (Finals)
- Competitors: 15 from 9 nations

Medalists
gold medal	Chhun Bunthorn	Cambodia
silver medal	Lương Đức Phước	Vietnam
bronze medal	Wan Muhammad Fazri Wan Zahari	Malaysia

=== Records ===
Prior to this competition, the existing Asian and SEA Games records were as follows:

AR	Yusuf Saad Kamel (BHR)	1:42.79	Fontvieille, Monaco	29 July 2008
GR	Samson Vellabouy (MAS)	1:48.29	Kuala Lumpur, Malaysia	14 August 1989

=== Results ===
Heat 1

Rank	Athlete	Time	Notes
1	Wan Muhammad Fazri Wan Zahari (MAS)	1:53.87	Q
2	Van Dung Giang (VIE)	1:54.21	Q
3	Zaw Min Min (MYA)	1:54.86	Q
4	Manuel Belo Amaral Ataíde (TLS)	1:55.24	
5	Hariharan Krishna (SGP)	1:57.68	Q
6	Yun Virak (CAM)	1:58.94	
7	Edwin Bartolome Giron (PHI)	3:33.02	

Heat 2

Rank	Athlete	Time	Notes
1	Chhun Bunthorn (CAM)	1:52.17	Q
2	Lương Đức Phước (VIE)	1:53.08	Q
3	Mariano Masano (PHI)	1:53.33	Q
4	Maheswaren Sunmugom (MAS)	1:53.68	Q
5	Joshua Robert Atkinson (THA)	1:54.26	Q
6	Aung Hein Htet (MYA)	1:54.84	
7	Shawn Wei En Chia (SGP)	1:57.19	
—	Wahyudi Putra (INA)		DNS

Finals

Rank	Athlete	Time	Notes
1st place, gold medalist(s)	Chhun Bunthorn (CAM)	1:52.91	
2nd place, silver medalist(s)	Lương Đức Phước (VIE)	1:53.34	
3rd place, bronze medalist(s)	Wan Muhammad Fazri Wan Zahari (MAS)	1:53.86	
4	Mariano Masano (PHI)	1:53.96	
5	Giang Văn Dũng (VIE)	1:54.98	
6	Maheswaren Sunmugom (MAS)	1:55.39	
7	Zaw Min Min (MYA)	1:55.99	
8	Hariharan Krishna (SGP)	1:57.98	
—	Joshua Robert Atkinson (THA)		DNS

== 5000 metre ==
Athletics – Men's 5000 metre at the 2023 SEA Games
- Venue: Morodok Techo National Stadium
- Date: 9 May 2023
- Competitors: 16 from 9 nations

Medalists
gold medal	Kieran Tuntivate	Thailand
silver medal	Sonny Montonegro Wagdos	Philippines
bronze medal	Robi Syianturi	Indonesia

=== Records ===
Prior to this competition, the existing Asian and SEA Games records were as follows:

AR	Albert Rop (BHR)	12:51.96	Fontvieille, Monaco	19 July 2013
GR	Nguyễn Văn Lai (VIE)	14:04.82	Kallang, Singapore	9 June 2015

=== Results ===
Rank	Athlete	Time	Notes
1st place, gold medalist(s)	Kieran Tuntivate (THA)	14:34.77	
2nd place, silver medalist(s)	Sonny Montonegro Wagdos (PHI)	14:36.45	
3rd place, bronze medalist(s)	Robi Syianturi (INA)	14:43.45	
4	Rui Yong Guillaume Soh (SGP)	14:48.43	
5	Tan Htike Soe (MYA)	14:52.22	
6	Felisberto de Deus (TLS)	15:01.79	
7	Eduard Josh Fullon Buenavista (PHI)	15:07.30	
8	Yan Vibol (CAM)	15:09.65	
9	Quoc Luat Do (VIE)	15:17.19	
10	Muhammad Ikbolasen (MAS)	15:31.81	
11	Van Thao Le (VIE)	15:37.41	
12	Pongsakorn Suksawat (THA)	15:40.26	
13	San Naing (MYA)	15:43.89	
14	Daren James Nair (MAS)	15:48.96	
15	Jeevaneesh So Soundararajah (SGP)	15:51.63	
16	Klaing Babunnara (CAM)	17:36.15	

== 10000 metre ==
Athletics – Men's 10000 metre at the 2023 SEA Games
- Venue: Morodok Techo National Stadium
- Date: 11 May 2023
- Competitors: 16 from 9 nations

Medalists
gold medal	Rikki Marthin Simbolon	Indonesia
silver medal	Soh Rui Yong	Singapore
bronze medal	Tan Htike Soe	Myanmar

=== Records ===
Prior to this competition, the existing Asian and SEA Games records were as follows:

AR	Abdullah Ahmad Hassan (QAT)	26:38.76	Brussels, Belgium	5 September 2003
GR	Eduardo Buenavista (PHI)	29:19.62	Hanoi, Vietnam	7 December 2003

=== Results ===
Rank	Athlete	Time	Notes
1st place, gold medalist(s)	Rikki Marthin Simbolon (INA)	31:08.85	
2nd place, silver medalist(s)	Soh Rui Yong (SGP)	31:10.70	NR
3rd place, bronze medalist(s)	Tan Htike Soe (MYA)	31:25.55	
4	Agus Prayogo (INA)	31:53.52	
5	Felisberto de Deus (TLS)	32:27.76	
6	Quoc Luat Do (VIE)	32:36.32	
7	Yan Vibol (CAM)	32:53.07	
8	Sonny Montenegro Wagdos (PHI)	33:00.23	
9	Richard San Luis Salaño (PHI)	34:12.04	
10	Muhammad Ikbolasen (MAS)	34:14.55	
11	Poo Vasanthan Subramaniam (MAS)	34:20.14	
12	Ouk Rohit (CAM)	34:44.19	
13	Nguyen Quoc Anh (VIE)	35:05.44	
14	San Naing (MYA)	35:36.67	
15	Boon He Shaun Goh (SGP)	37:31.25	
—	Kieran Tuntivate (THA)	—	DNS

== 110 metre hurdles ==
Athletics – Men's 110 metre hurdles at the 2023 SEA Games
- Venue: Morodok Techo National Stadium
- Date: 10 May 2023
- Competitors: 8 from 6 nations

Medalists
gold medal	Nattaphon Dansungnoen	Thailand
gold medal	Ang Chen Xiang	Singapore
bronze medal	John Cabang	Philippines

=== Records ===
Prior to this competition, the existing Asian and SEA Games records were as follows:

AR	Liu Xiang (CHN)	12.88	Lausanne, Switzerland	11 July 2006
GR	Jamras Rittidet (THA)	13.69	Kallang, Singapore	11 June 2015

=== Results ===
Rank	Athlete	Time	Notes
1st place, gold medalist(s)	Nattaphon Dansungnoen (THA)	13.831	
1st place, gold medalist(s)	Ang Chen Xiang (SGP)	13.831	NR
3rd place, bronze medalist(s)	John Cabang (PHI)	13.855	
4	Clinton Kingsley Bautista (PHI)	14.127	
5	Shareem Aleimran Abdul Raheem (MAS)	14.627	
6	Kongkham Kheuabmavong (LAO)	16.934	
7	Phan Phannchi (CAM)	17.010	
–	Benedict Ian Gawok (MAS)	–	DNF

== 400 metre hurdles ==
Athletics – Men's 400 metre hurdles at the 2023 SEA Games
- Venue: Morodok Techo National Stadium
- Date: 11 May 2023
- Competitors: 12 from 7 nations

Medalists
gold medal	Eric Cray	Philippines
silver medal	Natthaphon Dansungnoen	Thailand
bronze medal	Calvin Quek	Singapore

=== Records ===
Prior to this competition, the existing Asian and SEA Games records were as follows:

AR	Abderrahman Samba (QAT)	46.98	Paris, France	30 June 2018
GR	Eric Cray (PHI)	49.40	Kallang, Singapore	10 June 2015

=== Results ===
Heat 1

Rank	Athlete	Time	Notes
1	Quách Công Lịch (VIE)	53.37	Q
2	Alhryan Egonio Labita (PHI)	53.82	Q
3	Calvin Quek (SGP)	54.76	Q
4	Deuanpheng Xayyaphea (LAO)	55.32	Q
5	Thawatchai Khongjeam (THA)	55.89	
6	Phan Phannchi (CAM)	1:01.49	

Heat 2

Rank	Athlete	Time	Notes
1	Eric Cray (PHI)	52.73	Q
2	Ruslem Zikry Putra Roseli (MAS)	53.02	Q
3	Natthaphon Dansungnoen (THA)	53.71	Q
4	Halomoan Edwin Binsar (INA)	55.50	Q
5	Nguyen Duc Son (VIE)	57.78	
6	Phan Sokheng (CAM)	1:01.63	

Finals

Rank	Athlete	Time	Notes
1st place, gold medalist(s)	Eric Cray (PHI)	50.03	
2nd place, silver medalist(s)	Natthaphon Dansungnoen (THA)	50.73	
3rd place, bronze medalist(s)	Calvin Quek (SGP)	50.75	NR
4	Halomoan Edwin Binsar (INA)	51.54	
5	Ruslem Zikry Putra Roseli (MAS)	52.26	
6	Quách Công Lịch (VIE)	53.06	
7	Alhryan Egonio Labita (PHI)	53.89	
8	Deuanpheng Xayyaphea (LAO)	55.40	

== 3000 metre steeplechase ==
Athletics – Men's 3000 metre steeplechase at the 2023 SEA Games
- Venue: Morodok Techo National Stadium
- Date: 10 May 2023
- Competitors: 9 from 5 nations

Medalists
gold medal	Nguyễn Trung Cường	Vietnam
silver medal	Lê Tiến Long	Vietnam
bronze medal	Pandu Sukarya	Indonesia

=== Records ===
Prior to this competition, the existing Asian and SEA Games records were as follows:

AR	Saif Saeed Shaheen (QAT)	7:53.63	Brussels, Belgium	3 September 2004
GR	Eduardo Buenavista (PHI)	8:40.77	Kuala Lumpur, Malaysia	12 December 2001

=== Results ===
Rank	Athlete	Time	Notes
1st place, gold medalist(s)	Nguyễn Trung Cường (VIE)	8:51.99	
2nd place, silver medalist(s)	Lê Tiến Long (VIE)	8:53.62	
3rd place, bronze medalist(s)	Pandu Sukarya (INA)	8:55.05	
4	Atjong Tio Purwanto (INA)	8:55.49	
5	Junel Sergio Gabotia (PHI)	8:59.27	
6	Eduard Josh Fullon Buenavista (PHI)	9:17.62	
7	Daren James Nair (MAS)	9:24.21	
8	Ri Udom (CAM)	10:36.06	
9	Sorn Pisey (CAM)	10:42.85	

== 4 x 100 metre relay ==
Athletics – Men's 4 x 100 metre relay at the 2023 SEA Games
- Venue: Morodok Techo National Stadium
- Date: 10 May 2023
- Competitors: 29 from 8 nations

Medalists
gold medal	Lalu Muhammad Zohri; Bayu Kertanegara; Sudirman Hadi; Adith Rico Pradana	Indonesia
silver medal	Piyawat Aendu; Chayut Khongprasit; Muhamah Salaeh; Kobsit Sittichai	Thailand
bronze medal	Jonathan Nyepa; Khairul Hafiz Jantan; Mohamad Eizlan Dahalan; Muhammad Arsyad Md Saat	Malaysia
bronze medal	Joshua Chua; Ian Koe; Marc Brian Louis; Calvin Quek	Singapore

=== Records ===
Prior to this competition, the existing Asian and SEA Games records were as follows:

AR	Japan; Shuhei Tada, Kirara Shiraishi, Yoshihide Kiryū, Abdul Hakim Sani Brown	37.43	Doha, Qatar	5 October 2019
GR	Thailand; Bandit Chuangchai, Jaran Sathoengram, Kritsada Namsuwan, Nutthapong Veeravongratanasiri	38.90	Kuala Lumpur, Malaysia	25 August 2017

=== Results ===
Rank	Athlete	Time	Notes
1st place, gold medalist(s)	Indonesia; Lalu Muhammad Zohri, Bayu Kertanegara, Sudirman Hadi, Adith Rico Pradana	39.11	
2nd place, silver medalist(s)	Thailand; Piyawat Aendu, Chayut Khongprasit, Muhamah Salaeh, Kobsit Sittichai	39.13	
3rd place, bronze medalist(s)	Malaysia; Jonathan Nyepa, Khairul Hafiz Jantan, Mohamad Eizlan Dahalan, Muhammad Arsyad Md Saat	39.36	
3rd place, bronze medalist(s)	Singapore; Joshua Chua, Xander Ho, Marc Brian Louis, Mark Lee	39.36	
5	Philippines; Anfernee Talaboc Lopena, Clinton Bautista, Ernie Cabanza Calipay, John Tolentino	41.02	
6	Laos; Deuanpheng Xayyapheat, Kongkham Kheuabmavong, Sorsy Phomphakdi, Xaidavanh Vongsavanh	41.44	
—	Cambodia; Khem Nhork, Noeb Chanyourong, Pen Sokong, Phan Phannchi		DNF
—	Vietnam; Duc Anh Vu		DNS

== 4 x 400 metre relay ==
Athletics – Men's 4 x 400 metre relay at the 2023 SEA Games
- Venue: Morodok Techo National Stadium
- Date: 12 May 2023
- Competitors: 20 from 5 nations

Medalists
gold medal	Clinton Bautista; Michael del Prado; Joyme Sequita; Umajesty Williams	Philippines
silver medal	Jirateep Bundee; Apisit Chamsri; Thawatchai Khongjeam; Ruamchok Semathong	Thailand
bronze medal	Muhammad Firdaus Zemi; Ruslem Zikry Putra Roseli; Tharshan Shanmugam; Umar Osman	Malaysia

=== Records ===
Prior to this competition, the existing Asian and SEA Games records were as follows:

AR	Japan; Fuga Sato, Kaito Kawabata, Julian Jrummi Walsh, Yuki Joseph Nakajima	2:59.51	Eugene, United States	24 July 2022
GR	Thailand; Virot Sornhirun, Chanond Keanchan, Yuthana Thonglek, Aktawat Sakoolchan	3:05.47	Chiang Mai, Thailand	15 December 1995

=== Results ===
Rank	Athlete	Time	Notes
1st place, gold medalist(s)	Philippines; Clinton Bautista, Michael del Prado, Joyme Sequita, Umajesty Williams	3:07.22	
2nd place, silver medalist(s)	Thailand; Jirateep Bundee, Apisit Chamsri, Thawatchai Khongjeam, Ruamchok Semathong	3:07.23	
3rd place, bronze medalist(s)	Malaysia; Muhammad Firdaus Zemi, Ruslem Zikry Putra Roseli, Tharshan Shanmugam, Umar Osman	3:08.82	
4	Vietnam; Quách Công Lịch, Dinh Son Tran, Trần Nhật Hoàng, Nguyen Tung Lam	3:09.65	
5	Singapore; Ng Chin Hui, Reuben Rainer Lee, Thiruben Thana Rajan, Zubin Percy Muncherji	3:10.11	NR

== Marathon ==
Athletics – Men's Marathon at the 2023 SEA Games
- Date: 6 May 2023
- Competitors: 11 from 7 nations

Medalists
gold medal	Agus Prayogo	Indonesia
silver medal	Arlan Estobo Arbois	Philippines
bronze medal	Nguyen Thanh Hoang	Vietnam

=== Records ===
Prior to this competition, the existing Asian and SEA Games records were as follows:

AR	El Hassan El-Abbassi (QAT)	2:04:43	Valencia, Spain	2 December 2018
GR	Eduardus Nabunome (INA)	2:20:27	Jakarta, Indonesia	19 October 1997

=== Results ===
Rank	Athlete	Time
1st place, gold medalist(s)	Agus Prayogo (INA)	2:32:59
2nd place, silver medalist(s)	Arlan Estobo Arbois (PHI)	2:33:27
3rd place, bronze medalist(s)	Nguyen Thanh Hoang (VIE)	2:35:49
4	Tan Huong Leong (MAS)	2:40:26
5	Vanh Pheara (CAM)	2:41:26
6	Quoc Luong Trinh (VIE)	2:41:36
7	Sanchai Namkhet (THA)	2:43:47
8	Joanito Fernandes (TLS)	2:52:41
–	Tony Ah-Thit Payne (THA)	DNF
–	Yang Piseth (CAM)	DNF
–	Richard San Luis Salano (PHI)	DNF

== 20 kilometres race walk ==
Athletics – Men's 20 kilometres race walk at the 2023 SEA Games
- Venue: Angkor Wat
- Date: 6 May 2023
- Competitors: 9 from 6 nations

Medalists
gold medal	Hendro Yap	Indonesia
silver medal	Nguyễn Thành Ngưng	Vietnam
bronze medal	Pyae Phyo Htun	Myanmar

=== Records ===
Prior to this competition, the existing Asian and SEA Games records were as follows:

AR	Yusuke Suzuki (JPN)	1:16:36	Nomi, Japan	15 March 2015
GR	Harbans Singh Narinde (MAS)	1:29:13	Jakarta, Indonesia	14 October 1997

=== Results ===
Rank	Athlete	Time
1st place, gold medalist(s)	Hendro Yap (INA)	1:40:42
2nd place, silver medalist(s)	Nguyễn Thành Ngưng (VIE)	1:45:36
3rd place, bronze medalist(s)	Pyae Phyo Htun (MYA)	1:49:39
4	Artid Sriwichai (THA)	1:51:20
5	Sriven Tan (MAS)	1:52:59
6	Xuan Vinh Vo (VIE)	1:56:15
7	Fakhrul Razi (MAS)	2:02:44
8	Sat Nanvirakyuth (CAM)	2:29:17
–	Mine Nyi Nyi Moe (MYA)	DNF

== High jump ==
Athletics – Men's high jump at the 2023 SEA Games
- Venue: Morodok Techo National Stadium
- Date: 12 May 2023
- Competitors: 10 from 6 nations

Medalists
gold medal	Tawan Kaeodam	Thailand
silver medal	Vũ Đức Anh	Vietnam
bronze medal	Farell Glen Felix Jerus	Malaysia

=== Records ===
Prior to this competition, the existing Asian and SEA Games records were as follows:

AR	Mutaz Essa Barshim (QAT)	2.43 m	Brussels, Belgium	5 September 2014
GR	Loo Kum Zee (MAS)	2.24 m	Chiang Mai, Thailand	14 December 1995
GR	Nauraj Singh Randhawa (MAS)	2.24 m	Kuala Lumpur, Malaysia	26 August 2017
GR	Lee Hup Wei (MAS)	2.24 m	Kuala Lumpur, Malaysia	26 August 2017

=== Results ===
Rank	Athlete	Height	Notes
1st place, gold medalist(s)	Tawan Kaeodam (THA)	2.27 m	GR, NR
2nd place, silver medalist(s)	Vũ Đức Anh (VIE)	2.17 m	
3rd place, bronze medalist(s)	Farell Glen Felix Jerus (MAS)	2.15 m	
4	Eizlan Dahalan (MAS)	2.15 m	
5	Leonard Cantillo Grospe (PHI)	2.13 m	
6	Kobsit Sittichai (THA)	2.07 m	
7	Ernie Cabanza Calipay (PHI)	2.01 m	
8	Yan Chan (CAM)	1.95 m	
9	Khem Nhork (CAM)	1.85 m	
—	Moe Oo (MYA)	—	DNS

== Pole vault ==
Athletics – Men's pole vault at the 2023 SEA Games
- Venue: Morodok Techo National Stadium
- Date: 6 May 2023
- Competitors: 9 from 5 nations

Medalists
gold medal	Ernest John Obiena	Philippines
silver medal	Kasinpob Chomchanad	Thailand
bronze medal	Patsapong Amsam-ang	Thailand

=== Records ===
Prior to this competition, the existing Asian and SEA Games records were as follows:

AR	Ernest John Obiena (PHI)	5.94 m	Eugene, United States	24 July 2022
GR	Ernest John Obiena (PHI)	5.46 m	Hanoi, Vietnam	14 May 2022

=== Results ===
Rank	Athlete	5.20	5.25	5.30	5.35	5.40	5.45	5.55	5.60	5.65	Height	Notes
1st place, gold medalist(s)	Ernest John Obiena (PHI)	xo	–	–	–	xo	o	o	o	o	5.65 m	GR
2nd place, silver medalist(s)	Kasinpob Chomchanad (THA)	xo	–	–	–	xxR					5.20 m	
3rd place, bronze medalist(s)	Patsapong Amsam-ang (THA)	xxo	–	–	–	x--	xx				5.20 m	
4	Idan Fauzan Richsan (INA)										4.85 m	
5	Naufal Shahrul (MAS)										4.80 m	
6	Asrul Badroldin (MAS)										4.40 m	
—	Elijah Cole (PHI)										NH	
—	Low Jun Yu (SGP)										NH	
—	Koh Wei Shien (SGP)										NH	

o Valid trial | x Failed trial | - Passed trial | R Retired |

== Long jump ==
Athletics – Men's long jump at the 2023 SEA Games
- Venue: Morodok Techo National Stadium
- Date: 9 May 2023
- Competitors: 14 from 7 nations

Medalists
gold medal	Janry Ubas	Philippines
silver medal	Nguyễn Tiến Trọng	Vietnam
bronze medal	Sapwaturrahman Sapwaturrahman	Indonesia

=== Records ===
Prior to this competition, the existing Asian and SEA Games records were as follows:

AR	Mohamed Salman Al-Khuwalidi (KSA)	8.48 m	Sotteville-lès-Rouen, France	2 July 2006
GR	Sapwaturrahman Sapwaturrahman (INA)	8.03 m	New Clark City, Philippines	7 December 2019

=== Results ===
Rank	Athlete	Round						Mark	Note
Rank	Athlete	1	2	3	4	5	6	Mark	Note
1st place, gold medalist(s)	Janry Ubas (PHI)	7.85	x	7.64	x	x	x	7.85	
2nd place, silver medalist(s)	Nguyễn Tiến Trọng (VIE)	7.54	7.65	7.59	7.31	7.66	7.44	7.66	
3rd place, bronze medalist(s)	Sapwaturrahman Sapwaturrahman (INA)	7.53	7.62	x	x	7.52	x	7.62	
4	Xaidavanh Vongsavanh (LAO)	7.52	x	7.53	7.43	x	7.44	7.53	NR
5	Pham Van Nghia (VIE)	7.10	7.52	4.48	7.47	x	7.46	7.52	
6	Suwandi Wijaya (INA)	7.39	7.39	7.42	7.47	x	7.46	7.47	
7	Shahrizal Nasharuddin (MAS)	6.20	7.21	6.23	6.74	6.50	6.78	7.21	
8	John Marvin Aragon Rafols (PHI)	6.73	7.04	6.39	6.23	x	7.19	7.19	
9	Sunik Muslimin (MAS)	6.94	6.97	6.90	Did not advance			6.97	
10	Roen Chanrotha (CAM)	x	6.83	6.83	Did not advance			6.83	
11	Hoeun Chav (CAM)	x	6.47	6.65	Did not advance			6.65	
12	Hoeun Chav (THA)	DNS						0.00	

== Triple jump ==
Athletics – Men's triple jump at the 2023 SEA Games
- Venue: Morodok Techo National Stadium
- Date: 11 May 2023
- Competitors: 11 from 6 nations

Medalists
gold medal	Andre Anura	Malaysia
silver medal	Ronnie Malipay	Philippines
bronze medal	Mark Harry Diones	Philippines

=== Records ===
Prior to this competition, the existing Asian and SEA Games records were as follows:

AR	Li Yanxi (CHN)	17.59 m	Jinan, China	26 October 2009
GR	Muhammad Hakimi Ismail (MAS)	16.77 m	Kuala Lumpur, Malaysia	23 August 2017

=== Results ===
Rank	Athlete	Mark	Notes
1st place, gold medalist(s)	Andre Anura (MAS)	16.06	
2nd place, silver medalist(s)	Ronnie Malipay (PHI)	15.74	
3rd place, bronze medalist(s)	Mark Harry Diones (PHI)	15.70	
4	Nguyen Thuong Duc (VIE)	15.66	
5	Tran Van Dien (VIE)	15.61	
6	Pratchaya Tepparak (THA)	15.58	
7	Izzul Haniff Rafli (MAS)	15.38	
8	Phumiphat Khunmangkon (THA)	15.31	
9	Sapwaturrahman (INA)	14.75	
10	Roen Chanrotha (CAM)	13.25	
11	Hoeun Chav (CAM)	0.00	NM

== Shot put ==
Athletics – Men's shot put at the 2023 SEA Games
- Venue: Morodok Techo National Stadium
- Date: 9 May 2023
- Competitors: 7 from 5 nations

Medalists
gold medal	Jakkapat Noisri	Thailand
silver medal	Phan Thanh Bình	Vietnam
bronze medal	Muhammad Ziyad Zolkefli	Malaysia

=== Records ===
Prior to this competition, the existing Asian and SEA Games records were as follows:

AR	Tejinder Toor (IND)	21.49 m	Patiala, India	21 June 2021
GR	William Morrison III (PHI)	18.14 m	Hanoi, Vietnam	15 May 2022

=== Results ===
Rank	Athlete	Round						Mark	Notes
Rank	Athlete	1	2	3	4	5	6	Mark	Notes
1st place, gold medalist(s)	Jakkapat Noisri (THA)	17.51	x	x	17.84	x	17.76	17.84	
2nd place, silver medalist(s)	Phan Thanh Bình (VIE)	15.65	16.68	17.39	16.37	16.30	x	17.39	NR
3rd place, bronze medalist(s)	Muhammad Ziyad Zolkefli (MAS)	17.20	17.12	17.30	x	x	17.13	17.30	
4	Jonah Chang Rigan (MAS)	16.27	x	15.82	x	16.37	16.67	16.67	
5	William Edward Morrison (PHI)	15.73	x	x	16.08	15.74	16.14	16.14	
6	Thongchai Silamool (THA)	15.39	x	x	16.06	15.94	16.01	16.06	
7	John Albert Casol Mantua (PHI)	x	x	15.93	x	x	x	15.93	
8	Sim Samedy (CAM)	14.65	x	13.87	14.65	14.01	14.07	14.65	NR
9	Pang Chamroeun Vithiear (CAM)	12.28	12.83	13.19	Did not advance			13.19	

== Discus throw ==
Athletics – Men's discus throw at the 2023 SEA Games
- Venue: Morodok Techo National Stadium
- Date: 11 May 2023
- Competitors: 8 from 5 nations

Medalists
gold medal	Irfan Shamsuddin	Malaysia
silver medal	Kiadpradid Srisai	Thailand
bronze medal	Bandit Singhatongkul	Thailand

=== Records ===
Prior to this competition, the existing Asian and SEA Games records were as follows:

AR	Ehsan Haddadi (IRI)	69.32 m	Tallinn, Estonia	3 June 2008
GR	Wong Tuck Yim (SGP)	59.50 m	Bandar Seri Begawan, Brunei	8 August 1999

=== Results ===
Rank	Athlete	Round						Mark
Rank	Athlete	1	2	3	4	5	6	Mark
1st place, gold medalist(s)	Irfan Shamsuddin (MAS)	55.49	57.83	55.97	x	x	57.41	57.83
2nd place, silver medalist(s)	Kiadpradid Srisai (THA)	48.58	48.86	51.89	x	51.19	51.43	51.89
3rd place, bronze medalist(s)	Bandit Singhatongkul (THA)	x	48.83	x	x	x	50.02	50.02
4	Thanh Binh Phan (VIE)	45.54	47.30	48.42	47.16	47.19	x	48.42
5	Kamal Farhan Abdul Rahman (MAS)	46.38	46.76	46.76	45.34	44.49	44.57	46.76
6	John Albert Casol Mantua (PHI)	x	45.63	x	x	45.36	x	45.63
7	William Edward Morrison (PHI)	42.08	40.04	39.44	42.08	44.14	x	44.14
8	Sim Samedy (CAM)	36.83	37.58	35.61	36.30	36.97	36.28	37.58

== Hammer throw ==
Athletics – Men's hammer throw at the 2023 SEA Games
- Venue: Morodok Techo National Stadium
- Date: 6 May 2023
- Competitors: 7 from 5 nations

Medalists
gold medal	Kittipong Boonmawan	Thailand
silver medal	Jackie Wong	Malaysia
bronze medal	Sadat Marzuqi Ajisan	Malaysia

=== Records ===
Prior to this competition, the existing Asian and SEA Games records were as follows:

AR	Koji Murofushi (JPN)	84.86 m	Prague, Czech Republic	29 June 2003
GR	Kittipong Boonmawan (THA)	67.56 m	New Clark City, Philippines	7 December 2019

=== Results ===
Rank	Athlete	Round						Mark	Notes
Rank	Athlete	1	2	3	4	5	6	Mark	Notes
1st place, gold medalist(s)	Kittipong Boonmawan (THA)	59.52	62.57	64.49	59.12	61.78	56.58	64.49	
2nd place, silver medalist(s)	Jackie Wong (MAS)	61.17	62.54	64.20	62.37	63.19	62.64	64.20	
3rd place, bronze medalist(s)	Sadat Marzuqi Ajisan (MAS)	56.50	59.73	59.39	57.65	x	59.76	59.76	
4	Ye Htet Aung (MYA)	57.49	x	52.82	57.17	55.31	57.18	57.49	
5	Tanwarak Kanassavapaisal (THA)	x	49.69	x	x	52.37	53.98	53.98	
6	Pang Chamroeun Vithiear (CAM)	51.82	51.42	49.48	51.79	x	49.25	51.82	NR
7	John Albert Casol Mantua (PHI)	42.96	x	x	x	x	x	42.96	

== Javelin throw ==
Athletics – Men's javelin throw at the 2023 SEA Games
- Venue: Morodok Techo National Stadium
- Date: 6 May 2023
- Competitors: 8 from 6 nations

Medalists
gold medal	Abdul Hafiz	Indonesia
silver medal	Nguyễn Hoài Văn	Vietnam
bronze medal	Agustinus Abadi Ndiken	Indonesia

=== Records ===
Prior to this competition, the existing Asian and SEA Games records were as follows:

AR	Cheng Chao-tsun (TPE)	91.36 m	Taipei, Taiwan	26 August 2017
GR	Peerachet Jantra (THA)	76.30 m	Naypyidaw, Myanmar	17 December 2013

=== Results ===
Rank	Athlete	Round						Mark	Notes
Rank	Athlete	1	2	3	4	5	6	Mark	Notes
1st place, gold medalist(s)	Abdul Hafiz (INA)	66.54	68.74	69.60	69.34	65.83	60.64	69.60	
2nd place, silver medalist(s)	Nguyễn Hoài Văn (VIE)	61.80	63.08	69.55	65.98	64.91	63.42	69.55	
3rd place, bronze medalist(s)	Agustinus Abadi Ndiken (INA)	64.19	66.20	60.87	56.30	62.81	56.75	66.20	
4	John Paul Oria Sarmiento (PHI)	62.37	64.23	62.46	58.79	x	x	64.23	
5	Wachirawit Sornwichai (THA)	62.74	64.10	63.72	62.30	63.02	x	64.10	
6	Melvin Nolasci Calano (PHI)	63.96	62.68	63.23	58.13	63.94	x	63.96	
7	Syed Abrar Syed Ahmad (MAS)	53.47	54.08	54.17	55.37	49.10	53.76	55.37	
8	Touch Phoeurn (CAM)	47.80	35.25	38.36	38.54	45.98	43.83	47.80	NR

== Decathlon ==
Athletics – Men's decathlon at the 2023 SEA Games
- Venue: Morodok Techo National Stadium
- Date: 8–9 May 2023
- Competitors: 4 from 3 nations

Medalists
gold medal	Sutthisak Singkhon	Thailand
silver medal	Janry Borinaga Ubas	Philippines
bronze medal	Aries Bañez Toledo	Philippines

=== Records ===
Prior to this competition, the existing Asian and SEA Games records were as follows:

AR	Dmitriy Karpov (KAZ)	8725 pts	Athens, Greece	23–24 August 2004
GR	Sutthisak Singkhon (THA)	7603 pts	Hanoi, Vietnam	14–15 May 2022

=== Results ===
Key

The highest mark recorded in each event is highlighted in yellow

Rank	Athlete	100m	Long jump	Shot put	High jump	400m	110m hurdles	Discus throw	Pole vault	Javeline throw	1500m	Total points
1st place, gold medalist(s)	Sutthisak Singkhon (THA)	825; 11.64	898; 7.35	710; 13.70	714	816; 49.98	878; 14.77	700; 41.73	673	700; 57.46	554; 5:00.910	7468
2nd place, silver medalist(s)	Janry Borinaga Ubas (PHI)	865; 10.98	1081; 8.08 NR	543; 10.95	767	636; 54.08	774; 15.64	511; 32.35	880	567; 48.56	299; 5:51.800	6923
3rd place, bronze medalist(s)	Aries Bañez Toledo (PHI)	861; 11.00	845; 7.13	569; 11.39	661	739; 51.67	881; 14.74	519; 32.75	673	587; 49.91	556; 5:00.630	6891
4	Wilson Quaik Zhen Han (MAS)	723; 11.16	723; 6.61	536; 10.83	740	599; 55.00	795; 15.46	437; 28.60	0	537; 46.47	0 DQ	5090

== See also ==
- Athletics at the 2023 SEA Games – Women's Results
- Athletics at the 2023 SEA Games – Mixed 4 × 400 m relay
