= Athletics at the 2019 SEA Games – Results =

The athletics competitions at the 2019 SEA Games in the Philippines took place at the New Clark City Athletics Stadium in New Clark City.

The 2019 Games featured competitions in 23 events ( track, road, field and combined).

== Men ==
=== 100 metres ===
Athletics – Men's 100m at the 2019 SEA Games
- Venue: New Clark City Athletics Stadium, New Clark City
- Date: 8 December 2019 (Heats & Final)
- Competitors: 12 from 6 nations

Medalists
gold medal	Muhammad Haiqal Hanafi	Malaysia
silver medal	Ruttanapon Sowan	Thailand
bronze medal	Bandit Chuangchai	Thailand

==== Records ====
Prior to this competition, the existing Asian and SEA Games records were as follows:

AR	Femi Ogunode (QAT)	9.91	Wuhan, China	4 June 2015
GR	Suryo Agung Wibowo (INA)	10.17	Vientiane, Laos	13 December 2009

==== Results ====
Green denotes finalists. Wind: Heat 1 -0.1 m/s, Heat 2 +0.0 m/s, Final 0.1 m/s

Rank	Athlete	Heat 1		Heat 2		Final
Rank	Athlete	Time	Rank	Time	Rank	Time
1st place, gold medalist(s)	Muhammad Haiqal Hanafi (MAS)	10.39	2	—	—	10.35
2nd place, silver medalist(s)	Ruttanapon Sowan (THA)	10.34	1	—	—	10.49
3rd place, bronze medalist(s)	Bandit Chuangchai (THA)	—	—	10.50	1	10.52
4	Jonathan Nyepa (MAS)	—	—	10.65	3	10.60
5	Anfernee Lopena (PHI)	—	—	10.61	2	10.61
6	Mochammad Bisma Diwa Abina (INA)	10.72	3	—	—	10.73
7	Adit Rico Pradana (INA)	—	—	10.82	4	10.72
8	Sokong Pen (CAM)	10.87	4	—	—	10.88
9	Lwin Moe (MYA)	11.10	5	—	—	Did not advance
10	Nanthavath Khentan One (LAO)	—	—	11.30	5	Did not advance
11	Tort Salin (CAM)	—	—	11.38	6	Did not advance
12	Eric Cray (PHI)	DQ	6	—	—	Did not advance

=== 200 metres ===
Athletics – Men's 200m at the 2019 SEA Games
- Venue: New Clark City Athletics Stadium, New Clark City
- Date: 7 December 2019
- Competitors: 14 from 9 nations

Medalists
gold medal	Chayut Khongprasit	Thailand
silver medal	Siripol Punpa	Thailand
bronze medal	Russel Alexander Nasib Taib	Malaysia

==== Records ====
Prior to this competition, the existing Asian and SEA Games records were as follows:

AR	Xie Zhenye (CHN)	19.88	London, United Kingdom	21 July 2019
GR	Reanchai Seeharwong (THA)	20.69	Bandar Seri Begawan, Brunei	10 August 1999

==== Results ====
Green denotes finalists.

Rank	Athlete	Heat 1		Heat 2		Final
Rank	Athlete	Time	Rank	Time	Rank	Time
1st place, gold medalist(s)	Chayut Khongprasit (THA)	—	—	21.08	1	20.71
2nd place, silver medalist(s)	Siripol Punpa (THA)	21.05	1	—	—	20.78
3rd place, bronze medalist(s)	Russel Alexander Nasib Taib (MAS)	—	—	21.40	2	21.11
4	Luong Van Thao (VIE)	—	—			21.14
5	Eko Rimbawan (INA)	—	—	21.65	3	21.22
6	Adi Joko Kuncoro (INA)	21.66	2	—	—	21.40
7	Jonathan Nyepa Anak (MAS)	21.68	3	—	—	21.41
8	Jin Wei Timothee Yap (SGP)	—	—	21.76	5	21.56
9	Muhammad Noor Firdasu Ar-Rasyid (BRU)	—	—	21.84	6	Did not advance
10	Lwin Moe (MYA)	22.33	4	—	—	Did not advance
10	Sokong Pen (CAM)	—	—	22.28	5	Did not advance
12	Nanthavath Khentan One (LAO)	22.87	5	—	—	Did not advance
13	Tort Salin (CAM)	23.17	6	—	—	Did not advance
14	Sokong Pen (CAM)	DNS	7	—	—	Did not advance

=== 400 metres ===
Athletics – Men's 400m at the 2019 SEA Games
- Venue: New Clark City Athletics Stadium, New Clark City
- Date: 8 December 2019
- Competitors: 14 from 7 nations

Medalists
gold medal	Trần Nhật Hoàng	Vietnam
silver medal	Tran Dinh Son	Vietnam
bronze medal	Sunthonthuam Phitchaya	Thailand

==== Records ====
Prior to this competition, the existing Asian and SEA Games records were as follows:

AR	Yousef Masrahi (KSA)	43.93	Beijing, China	23 August 2015
GR	Kunanon Sukkaew (THA)	46.00	Singapore	12 June 2015

==== Results ====
Green denotes finalists.

Rank	Athlete	Heat 1		Heat 2		Final
Rank	Athlete	Time	Rank	Time	Rank	Time
1st place, gold medalist(s)	Trần Nhật Hoàng (VIE)	—	—	47.06	1	46.56
2nd place, silver medalist(s)	Tran Dinh Son (VIE)	46.92	1	—	—	46.68
3rd place, bronze medalist(s)	Sunthonthuam Phitchaya (THA)	—	—	47.43	2	46.98
4	Sequita Joyme (PHI)	—	—	47.76	4	47.71
5	Michael Cardo Del Prado (PHI)	47.58	3	—	—	47.74
6	Tan Zong Yang (SGP)	—	—	47.56	3	47.93
7	Muhammad Saiful Safwan Saifuddin (MAS)	—	—	48.11	5	47.77
8	Luqmanul Hakim Khairul Akmal (MAS)	47.56	2	—	—	DNS
9	Nattapong Kongkraphan (THA)	47.95	4	—	—	Did not advance
10	Zubin Muncherji (SGP)	48.75	5	—	—	Did not advance
11	Min Min Zaw (MYA)	—	—	6	50.55	Did not advance
12	Ataide Manuel Belo Amaral (TLS)	52.18	6	—	—	Did not advance

=== 800 metres ===
Athletics – Men's 800m at the 2019 SEA Games
- Venue: New Clark City Athletics Stadium, New Clark City
- Date: 9 December 2019
- Competitors: 11 from 7 nations

Medalists
gold medal	Duong Van Thai	Vietnam
silver medal	Lily Carter James	Philippines
bronze medal	Royson Vincent	Malaysia

==== Records ====
Prior to this competition, the existing Asian and SEA Games records were as follows:

AR	Yusuf Saad Kamel (BHR)	1:42.79	Fontvieille, Monaco	29 July 2008
GR	Samson Vellabouy (MAS)	1:48.29	Kuala Lumpur, Malaysia	14 August 1989

==== Results ====
Rank	Athlete	Final
Rank	Athlete	Time
1st place, gold medalist(s)	Duong Van Thai (VIE)	1:49.91
2nd place, silver medalist(s)	Lily Carter James (PHI)	1:50.17
3rd place, bronze medalist(s)	Royson Vincent (MAS)	1:50.68
4	Pleenaram Jirayu (THA)	1:51.68
5	Chhun Bunthorn (CAM)	1:52.33
6	Van Dong Tran (VIE)	1:53.09
7	Putra Azrul Syazwan Azman (MAS)	1:53.46
8	Min Min Zaw (MYA)	1:54.01
9	Marco Vilog (PHI)	1:54.22
10	Ataide Manuel Belo Amaral (TLS)	2:00.84
11	Roberto Belo Amaral Soares (TLS)	2:01.64

=== 1500 metres ===
Athletics – Men's 1500m at the 2019 SEA Games
- Venue: New Clark City Athletics Stadium, Kuala Lumpur
- Date: 8 December 2019
- Competitors: 5 from 5 nations

Medalists
gold medal	Duong Van Thai	Vietnam
silver medal	Masano Mariano	Philippines
bronze medal	Yothin Yaprajan	Thailand

==== Records ====
Prior to this competition, the existing Asian and SEA Games records were as follows:

AR	Rashid Ramzi (BHR)	3:29.14	Rome, Italy	14 July 2006
GR	Nguyễn Đình Cương (VIE)	3:45.31	Nakhon Ratchasima, Thailand	11 December 2007

==== Results ====
Rank	Athlete	Final
Rank	Athlete	Time
1st place, gold medalist(s)	Duong Van Thai (VIE)	4:06.63
2nd place, silver medalist(s)	Masano Mariano (PHI)	4:08.27
3rd place, bronze medalist(s)	Yothin Yaprajan (THA)	4:08.90
4	Chhun Bunthorn (CAM)	4:12.75
5	Roberto Belo Amaral Soares (TLS)	4:15.51

=== 5000 metres ===
Athletics – Men's 5000m at the 2019 SEA Games
- Venue: New Clark City Athletics Stadium, New Clark City
- Date: 9 December 2019
- Competitors: 10 from 8 nations

Medalists
gold medal	Kieran Tuntivate	Thailand
silver medal	Nguyễn Văn Lai	Vietnam
bronze medal	Sonny Wagdos	Philippines

==== Records ====
Prior to this competition, the existing Asian and SEA Games records were as follows:

AR	Albert Kibichii Rop (BHR)	12:51.96	Fontvieille, Monaco	19 July 2013
GR	Nguyen Van Lai (VIE)	14:04.82	Singapore	9 June 2015

==== Results ====
Rank	Athlete	Final
Rank	Athlete	Time
1st place, gold medalist(s)	Kieran Tuntivate (THA)	14:31.15
2nd place, silver medalist(s)	Nguyễn Văn Lai (VIE)	14:32.42
3rd place, bronze medalist(s)	Sonny Wagdos (PHI)	14:34.73
4	Felisberto De Deus (TLS)	14:35.57
5	Agus Prayogo (INA)	14:47.48
6	Nattawut Innum (THA)	14:48.68
7	Prabudass Krishnan (MAS)	14:56.75
8	Sysavath Thammavongchit (LAO)	15:51.07
9	Ma Viro (CAM)	17:29.95
10	Robi Syianturi (INA)	DNS

=== 10000 metres ===
Athletics – Men's 10000m at the 2019 SEA Games
- Venue: New Clark City Athletics Stadium, New Clark City
- Date: 7 December 2019
- Competitors: 8 from 5 nations

Medalists
gold medal	Kieran Tuntivate	Thailand
silver medal	Agus Prayogo	Indonesia
bronze medal	Nguyen Van Lai	Vietnam

==== Records ====
Prior to this competition, the existing Asian and SEA Games records were as follows:

AR	Ahmad Hassan Abdullah (QAT)	26:38.76	Brussels, Belgium	5 September 2003
GR	Eduardo Buenavista (PHI)	29:19.62	Hanoi, Vietnam	7 December 2003

==== Results ====
Rank	Athlete	Final
Rank	Athlete	Time
1st place, gold medalist(s)	Kieran Tuntivate (THA)	30:19.28
2nd place, silver medalist(s)	Agus Prayogo (INA)	30:22.13
3rd place, bronze medalist(s)	Nguyen Van Lai (VIE)	30:29.73
4	Đỗ Quốc Luật (VIE)	30:49.59
5	De Deus Feliberto (TLS)	30:52.52
6	Nattawut Innum (THA)	31:30.53
7	Solano Richard (PHI)	32:47.91
8	Syianturi Robi (INA)	33:14.02

=== 110 metres hurdles ===
Athletics – Men's 110m hurdles at the 2019 SEA Games
- Venue: New Clark City Athletics Stadium, New Clark City
- Date: 9 December 2019
- Competitors: 9 from 6 nations

Medalists
gold medal	Clinton Kingsley Bautista	Philippines
silver medal	Rayzam Shah	Malaysia
bronze medal	Anousone Xaysa	Laos

==== Records ====
Prior to this competition, the existing Asian and SEA Games records were as follows:

AR	Liu Xiang (CHN)	12.88	Lausanne, Switzerland	11 July 2006
GR	Jamras Rittidet (THA)	13.69	Singapore	11 June 2015

==== Results ====
Rank	Athlete	Final
Rank	Athlete	Time
1st place, gold medalist(s)	Clinton Kingsley Bautista (PHI)	13.97
2nd place, silver medalist(s)	Rayzam Shah (MAS)	13.97
3rd place, bronze medalist(s)	Anousone Xaysa (LAO)	13.99
4	Rio Maholtra (INA)	14.06
5	Phanuwat Kwanyuen (THA)	14.23
6	Awyong Liang Qi (SGP)	14.31
7	Alvin John Vergel (PHI)	14.46
8	Ang Chen Xiang (SGP)	14.49
9	Dansungnoen Natthapon (THA)	15.40

=== 400 metres hurdles ===
Athletics – Men's 400m hurdles at the 2019 SEA Games
- Venue: New Clark City Athletics Stadium, New Clark City
- Date: 10 December 2019
- Competitors: 9 from 6 nations

Medalists
gold medal	Eric Shauwn Cray	Philippines
silver medal	Halomoan Binsar Edwin	Indonesia
bronze medal	Quách Công Lịch	Vietnam

==== Records ====
Prior to this competition, the existing Asian and SEA Games records were as follows:

AR	Abderrahman Samba (QAT)	47.53	Paris, France	30 June 2018
GR	Eric Shauwn Cray (PHI)	49.40	Singapore	10 June 2015

==== Results ====
Rank	Athlete	Final
Rank	Athlete	Time
1st place, gold medalist(s)	Eric Shauwn Cray (PHI)	50.21
2nd place, silver medalist(s)	Halomoan Binsar Edwin (INA)	50.81
3rd place, bronze medalist(s)	Quách Công Lịch (VIE)	51.60
4	Francis Medina (PHI)	51.68
5	Phan Khắc Khoan (VIE)	52.30
6	Ow Yeong Wei Bin (SGP)	52.46
7	Ruslem Zikry Putra Roseli (MAS)	52.56
8	Witthawat Thumcha (THA)	52.65
9	Prasertsab Thanawit (THA)	54.85
