= Malaysia at the 1993 SEA Games =

Malaysia at the 1993 Southeast Asian Games
- IOC code: MAS
- NOC: Olympic Council of Malaysia
- Website: www.olympic.org.my (in English)

in Singapore
- Competitors: 420 in 28 sports
- Medals Ranked 5th: Gold 43 Silver 45 Bronze 65 Total 153

Southeast Asian Games appearances (overview)
- 1959; 1961; 1965; 1967; 1969; 1971; 1973; 1975; 1977; 1979; 1981; 1983; 1985; 1987; 1989; 1991; 1993; 1995; 1997; 1999; 2001; 2003; 2005; 2007; 2009; 2011; 2013; 2015; 2017; 2019; 2021; 2023; 2025; 2027; 2029

Malaysia competed in the 1993 Southeast Asian Games held in Singapore from 12 to 20 June 1993.

== Medal summary ==
=== Medals by sport ===
Sport	Gold	Silver	Bronze	Total	Rank
Athletics	14	2	0	16	
Badminton	1	1	5	7	2
Basketball	1	0	0	1	2
Total	43	45	65	153	5

=== Medallists ===
Medal	Name	Sport	Event
Gold	Ramu Thangavalu	Athletics	Men's 800 metres
Gold	Munusamy Ramachandran	Athletics	Men's 5000 metres
Gold	Munusamy Ramachandran	Athletics	Men's 10,000 metres
Gold	Nur Herman Majid	Athletics	Men's 110 metres hurdles
Gold	Loo Cwee Peng	Athletics	Men's high jump
Gold	Mohamed Zaki Sadri	Athletics	Men's long jump
Gold	Mohamed Zaki Sadri	Athletics	Men's triple jump
Gold	Arjan Singh	Athletics	Men's shot put
Gold	Wong Tee Kue	Athletics	Men's hammer throw
Gold	Padmanathan Nambiars	Athletics	Men's 20 kilometres road walk
Gold	Jayanthi Palaniappan	Athletics	Women's 3000 metres
Gold	Jayanthi Palaniappan	Athletics	Women's 10,000 metres
Gold	Cheng Tong Lean	Athletics	Women's 10,000 metres track walk
Gold	R. Shanti, Josephine Mary, G. Shanti & Rabia Abdul Salam	Athletics	Women's 4 × 400 metres relay
Gold	Cheah Soon Kit; Soo Beng Kiang	Badminton	Men's doubles
Gold	Malaysia national basketball team	Basketball	Women's tournament
Gold		Karate	Men's team kumite
Silver	Shanti Govindasamy	Athletics	Women's 100 metres
Silver	Shanti Govindasamy	Athletics	Women's 200 metres
Silver	Malaysia national badminton team	Badminton	Men's team
Bronze	Ong Ewe Hock	Badminton	Men's singles
Bronze	Tan Kim Her; Yap Kim Hock	Badminton	Men's doubles
Bronze	Lee Wai Leng; Tan Lee Wai	Badminton	Women's doubles
Bronze	Tan Kim Her; Tan Lee Wai	Badminton	Mixed doubles
Bronze	Malaysia national badminton team	Badminton	Women's team

== Football ==
=== Men's tournament ===
Group A

Team	Pld	W	D	L	GF	GA	GD	Pts
Thailand	4	4	0	0	13	3	+9	8
Myanmar	4	3	0	1	15	4	+11	6
Malaysia	4	2	0	2	13	5	+8	4
Laos	4	1	0	3	3	20	−17	2
Brunei	4	0	0	4	3	15	−12	0

9 June 1993

Malaysia	3 – 1	Brunei

11 June 1993

Malaysia	9 – 0	Laos

13 June 1993

Myanmar	2 – 1	Malaysia

15 June 1993

Thailand	2 – 0	Malaysia
