= 2025 SEA Games opening ceremony =

- Part of the 2025 SEA Games
- Date: 9 December 2025; 6 months ago
- Time: 19:00 – 21:30 ICT (UTC+7)
- Venue: Rajamangala Stadium
- Location: Bangkok, Thailand; 13°45′19″N 100°37′22″E
- Also known as: We Are One (Thai: เราเป็นหนึ่งเดียว)
- Filmed by: National Broadcasting Services of Thailand (NBT)
- Footage: 2025 SEA Games opening ceremony in FPT Bóng Đá Việt (FPT Vietnamese Football) on YouTube

The opening ceremony of the 2025 SEA Games took place on 9 December 2025 across Bangkok, began at 19:00 ICT (12:00 UTC) and ended at 21:30 ICT (14:30 UTC). The Games was formally opened by the king of Thailand, Vajiralongkorn. The ceremony marked the decades of the 1975, 1985 and 1995 Southeast Asian Games.

== Proceedings ==
=== Parade of nations ===
Order	Team	Thai	Miss	Flagbearer(s)	Sport(s)	Ref.
1	Brunei	บรูไน	Saffron Maya Snook (Miss Global Thailand 2025)	Walid Lachkar; Nur Hafizah Haji Abdul Sidek	Wushu; Netball	
2	Cambodia	กัมพูชา	Vanessa Wenk (Miss Intercontinental Thailand 2025)	Kongmona Jassica; Va Mithona	Jujutsu; Taekwondo	
3	Indonesia	อินโดนีเซีย	Anchilee Scott-Kemmis (Miss Universe Thailand 2021)	Robi Syianturi; Megawati Hangestri Pertiwi	Athletics; Volleyball	
4	Laos	ลาว	Sireethorn Leearamwat (Miss International 2019)	Vilasack Lathsavong	Petanque	
5	Malaysia	มาเลเซีย	Chonnikarn Supittayaporn (Miss Thailand 2023)	Andre Anura Anuar; Aaliyah Yoong Hanifah	Athletics; Water skiing	
6	Myanmar	พม่า	Kirana Yuthong (2nd runner-up Miss Thailand 2025)	Aung Cho Myint; Thet Htar Thuzar	Sepak takraw Badminton	
7	Philippines	ฟิลิปปินส์	Anntonia Porsild (Miss Supranational 2019, 1st runner-up Miss Universe 2023)	Bryan Bagunas; Alexandra Eala	Volleyball; Tennis	
8	Singapore	สิงคโปร์	Chatnalin Chotjirawarachat (Miss Intercontinental 2023)	Noah Lim; Yeo Jia Min	Ju-jitsu; Badminton	
9	Timor-Leste	ติมอร์-เลสเต	Panida Kernjinda (Miss Thailand 2024)	Jolanio Guterres; Ana da Costa da Silva	Swimming; Taekwondo	
10	Vietnam	เวียดนาม	Nicha Poonpoka (2nd runner-up Miss Universe Thailand 2023)	Lê Minh Thuận; Lê Thanh Thúy	Karate; Volleyball	
11	Thailand	ประเทศไทย	Suchata Chuangsri (Miss World 2025)	Kunlavut Vitidsarn; Janjaem Suwannapheng	Badminton; Boxing	

== Music performers ==
- Violette Wautier (performing "1%")
- TWOPEE (performing "1%")
- F.Hero (performing "1%")
- Prajya Meebumrung
- Pannasit Sukahotu
- BamBam (performing "WHEEL UP" and "Rak Nak Nean")
- Jespipat Tilapornputt (performing "Rak Nak Nean")
- Suradet Piniwat (performing "Rak Nak Nean")
- Longshi Lee (performing "Rak Nak Nean")
- Panuwat Sopradit (performing "Rak Nak Nean")
- Naret Promphaopun (performing "Rak Nak Nean")
- Pruk Panich (performing "Rak Nak Nean")
- Teetut Chungmanirat (performing "Rak Nak Nean")

== Anthems ==
- Thai National Anthem - Phleng Chat Thai
- Sansoen Phra Barami - Thai Royal Anthem
- SEAGF Anthem

== Dignitaries in attendance ==
=== Host nation ===
- King Vajiralongkorn
- Queen Suthida
- Prime Minister Anutin Charnvirakul
- Thananon Niramit, Partner of the Prime Minister
- Deputy Prime Minister Thamanat Prompow
- Atthakorn Sirilatthayakorn, Minister of Tourism and Sports
- Natthriya Thaweevong, Permanent Secretary of Tourism and Sports
- Tharapong Malakam, Permanent Secretary of Defence
- Atthasit Samphantharat, Permanent Secretary of Interior
- Gongsak Yodmani, Governor of the Sports Authority of Thailand
- Patama Leeswadtrakul, IOC Member
- Pimol Srivikorn, President of the National Olympic Committee of Thailand
- Chadchart Sittipunt, Governor of Bangkok
- Narit Niramaiwong, Governor of Chonburi
- Rattasart Chidchu, Governor of Songkhla

=== Foreign dignitaries ===
- Prince Abdul Mateen of Brunei
- Princess Anisha Rosnah of Brunei
- Princess Azemah Ni'matul Bolkiah of Brunei
- Pengiran Muda Bahar of Brunei
- Prince Jefri Bolkiah of Brunei

=== Southeast Asian Games Federation ===
- Chaiyapak Siriwat, President of the Southeast Asian Games Federation
