= Andre Anura =

Malaysian athletics competitor

Personal information
- Nickname: Anura
- Nationality: Malaysian
- Born: Andre Anura Anuar; 11 June 1999 (age 27) Tenom, Sabah, Malaysia
- Height: 1.69 m (5.5 ft)

Sport
- Country: Malaysia
- Sport: Track and field
- Event(s): long jump, triple jump
Medal record
Representing Malaysia
Southeast Asian Games
Gold medal – first place	2021 Hanoi	Triple jump
Gold medal – first place	2023 Phnom Penh	Triple jump
Silver medal – second place	2019 Manila	Long jump
Silver medal – second place	2025 Bangkok	Triple jump
ASEAN School Games
Gold medal – first place	2015 Seri Begawan	Long jump

Andre Anura Anuar (born 11 June 1999) is a Malaysian athlete.

== Early life and background ==
Andre was born on 12 Jun 1999 in Tenom, Sabah, Malaysia. He attended the Malaysian Sports School in Sepanggar, Manggatal, Kota Kinabalu.

== Athletics career ==
He started his career at the age of 16 during the 2015 ASEAN School Games when he won the gold medal in the long jump event.

2019

Andre stole the spotlight after breaking Josbert Tinus's 12-year-long national jump record by achieving a distance of 8.02 metres (m) to win a silver medal during the 2019 Southeast Asian Games. The victory saw Andre surpass a previous mark of 7.88m set by Tinus at the Thai CDI Bangkok Open Championship in October 2007.

2022

Representing Malaysia, Andre won the gold medal at the 2021 Southeast Asian Games in Hanoi, Vietnam on 17 May 2022 with a mark of 16.21 m.

2023

In May 2023, Andre competed in the 2023 Southeast Asian Games in Phnom Penh, Cambodia. He won the gold medal in the triple jump event.

2025

In December 2025, Andre competed in the 2025 Southeast Asian Games in Thailand. He was chosen as the Malaysian contingent flag bearer at the opening ceremony alongside water skiing athlete Aaliyah Yoong Hanifah.
