= Sudirman Hadi =

Indonesian Olympic sprinter

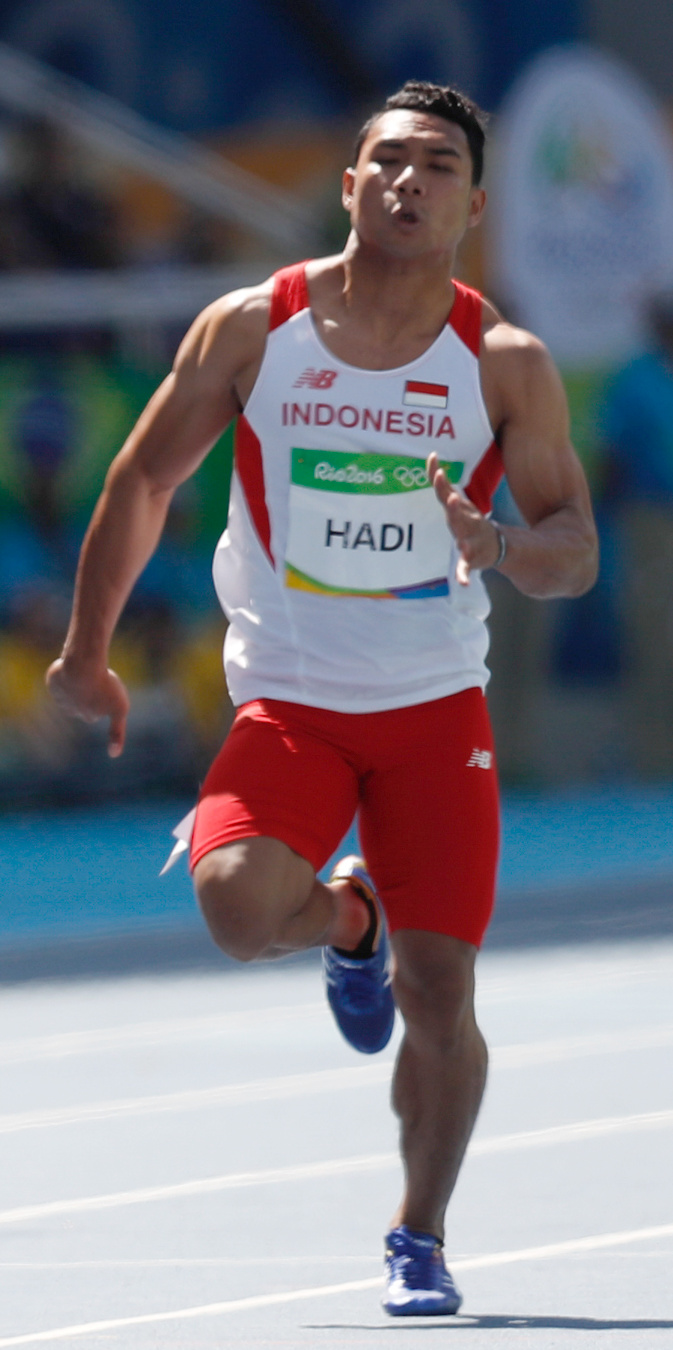
- Hadi at the 2016 Olympics

Personal information
- Born: 9 March 1996 (age 30) North Lombok, West Nusa Tenggara, Indonesia
- Height: 171 cm (5 ft 7 in)
- Weight: 76 kg (168 lb)

Sport
- Sport: Athletics
- Events: 100 m, 200 m

Achievements and titles
- Personal bests: 100 m – 10.41 (2015); 200 m – 22.19 (2013)
Medal record
Men's athletics
Representing Indonesia
SEA Games
Gold medal – first place	2023 Cambodia	4x100 m relay
Southeast Asian Youth Championships
Silver medal – second place	2013 Ho Chi Minh City	100 m

Sudirman Hadi (born 9 March 1996) is a sprinter from Indonesia. He competed in the 100 m event at the 2016 Summer Olympics and qualified to the main heat by finishing second in his preliminary heat. He then finished last in his heat, with a time of 10.70.
