= Athletics at the 2018 Asian Games – Men's pole vault =

Men's pole vault at the 2018 Asian Games
- Venue: Gelora Bung Karno Stadium
- Date: 29 August 2018
- Competitors: 13 from 9 nations

Medalists
gold medal	Seito Yamamoto	Japan
silver medal	Yao Jie	China
bronze medal	Patsapong Amsam-ang	Thailand

The men's pole vault competition at the 2018 Asian Games took place on 29 August 2018 at the Gelora Bung Karno Stadium.

== Schedule ==
All times are Western Indonesia Time (UTC+07:00)

Date	Time	Event
Wednesday, 29 August 2018	18:40	Final

== Records ==
Prior to this competition, the existing world, Asian and Games records were as follows.

World Record	Renaud Lavillenie (FRA)	6.16	Donetsk, Ukraine	15 February 2014
Asian Record	Igor Potapovich (KAZ)	5.92	Stockholm, Sweden	19 February 1998
Games Record	Igor Potapovich (KAZ)	5.65	Hiroshima, Japan	14 October 1994

== Results ==
Rank	Athlete	Attempt										Result	Notes
Rank	Athlete	4.70	4.85	5.00	5.10	5.20	5.30	5.40	5.50	5.60	5.65	Result	Notes
Rank	Athlete	5.70	5.75	5.84								Result	Notes
1st place, gold medalist(s)	Seito Yamamoto (JPN)	–	–	–	–	–	O	–	XO	O	X–	5.70	GR
1st place, gold medalist(s)	Seito Yamamoto (JPN)	O	–	XXX								5.70	GR
2nd place, silver medalist(s)	Yao Jie (CHN)	–	–	–	–	–	XXO	XO	O	X–	XX	5.50	
3rd place, bronze medalist(s)	Patsapong Amsam-ang (THA)	–	–	O	–	O	XO	O	XO	XXX		5.50	
4	Sergey Grigoryev (KAZ)	–	–	O	–	XO	–	XO	XXX			5.40	
5	Hussain Al-Hizam (KSA)	–	–	–	–	O	–	XXO	XX–	X		5.40	
5	Jin Min-sub (KOR)	–	–	–	–	–	–	XXO	–	XXX		5.40	
7	EJ Obiena (PHI)	–	–	–	–	–	O	–	XXX			5.30	
8	Nikita Filippov (KAZ)	–	–	–	XO	–	XXO	XXX				5.30	
9	Iskandar Alwi (MAS)	–	–	O	XO	O	XXX					5.20	
10	Porranot Purahong (THA)	–	–	XO	–	XXO	XXX					5.20	
11	Kosei Takekawa (JPN)	–	–	XO	–	XXX						5.00	
12	Teuku Tegar Abadi (INA)	O	O	XXX								4.85	
13	Idan Fauzan Richsan (INA)	XXO	O	XXX								4.85	
