= Athletics at the 2019 Summer Universiade – Men's pole vault =

Men's pole vault event

The men's pole vault event at the 2019 Summer Universiade was held on 10 and 12 July at the Stadio San Paolo in Naples.

== Medalists ==
Gold	Silver	Bronze
Ernest Obiena; Philippines	Torben Blech; Germany	Ben Broeders; Belgium

== Results ==
=== Qualification ===
Qualification: 5.60 m (Q) or at least 12 best (q) qualified for the final.

Rank	Group	Name	Nationality	4.95	5.10	5.25	Result	Notes
1	A	Mathieu Collet	France	–	o	o	5.25	q
1	A	Masaki Ejima	Japan	–	–	o	5.25	q
1	A	Carson Waters	United States	–	o	o	5.25	q
1	B	Angus Armstrong	Australia	–	o	o	5.25	q
1	B	Ben Broeders	Belgium	–	–	o	5.25	q
1	B	Ernest John Obiena	Philippines	–	–	o	5.25	q
7	A	Stephen Clough	Australia	–	o	xo	5.25	q
7	A	Torben Blech	Germany	–	–	xo	5.25	q
7	B	Kosei Takekawa	Japan	–	o	xo	5.25	q
10	B	Nicholas Southgate	New Zealand	–	xxo	xo	5.25	q
11	A	James Steyn	New Zealand	–	o	xxo	5.25	q
12	B	Patsapong Amsam-Ang	Thailand	xo	xxo	xxo	5.25	q
13	A	Frederik Ausloos	Belgium	o	o	xxx	5.10	
14	B	Koen van der Wijst	Netherlands	–	xo	xxx	5.10	
	A	Alessandro Sinno	Italy	–	xxx		NM	
	B	Tristan Slater	Canada	–	xxx		NM	

=== Final ===
Official Video

Rank	Name	Nationality	5.06	5.21	5.31	5.41	5.51	5.56	5.61	5.66	5.71	5.76	5.81	Result	Notes
1st place, gold medalist(s)	Ernest John Obiena	Philippines	–	–	o	x–	o	–	x–	o	x–	xo	xxx	5.76	NR
2nd place, silver medalist(s)	Torben Blech	Germany	–	o	–	o	o	–	o	–	xo	xxo	xxx	5.76	PB
3rd place, bronze medalist(s)	Ben Broeders	Belgium	–	–	o	–	o	–	x–	xx				5.51	
4	Carson Waters	United States	–	xo	o	xxo	x–	xx						5.41	
5	Kosei Takekawa	Japan	xo	o	o	xxx								5.31	
6	Patsapong Amsam-Ang	Thailand	o	o	xxo	xxx								5.31	
7	Mathieu Collet	France	–	o	–	xxx								5.21	
7	Masaki Ejima	Japan	–	o	–	xxx								5.21	
9	Nicholas Southgate	New Zealand	o	xo	xxx									5.21	
10	Angus Armstrong	Australia	o	xxx										5.06	
11	Stephen Clough	Australia	xo	xxx										5.06	
	James Steyn	New Zealand	xxx											NM	
