= Vitaly Petrov (athletics) =

Ukrainian athletics coach

Personal information
- Full name: Vitaly Afanasevich Petrov
- Nationality: Ukrainian
- Born: October 6, 1945 (age 80) Staline, Ukrainian SSR, Soviet Union

Sport
- Country: Ukraine
- Sport: Athletics
- Event: Pole vault
Medal record
Event	1st	2nd	3rd
Olympic Games	3	0	1
World Championships	6	0	0

Vitaly Afanasevich Petrov (Ukrainian: Віталій Опанасович Петров, Russian: Виталий Афанасьевич Петров; born 6 October 1945 in Donetsk, Soviet Union) is a Ukrainian athletics coach, mainly specialising in pole vault. He was the coach of legendary pole vaulters, like Sergey Bubka, Yelena Isinbayeva and Giuseppe Gibilisco. All three were world champions, with the first two also winning Olympic gold medals and setting world records.

== Biography ==
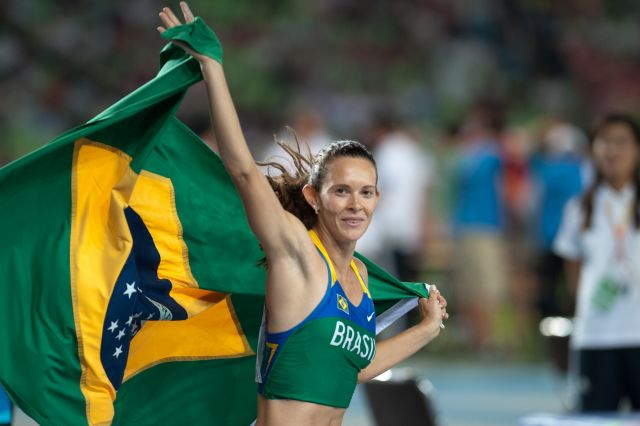
Brazilian pole vaulter Fabiana Murer, became the World Champion under Petrov's coaching.

Vitaly Petrov was the first coach of the Ukrainian Sergey Bubka, which he took in technique foster care in 1974, when Bubka was just eleven years old. The relationship was broken on June 16, 1990 after 16 years of collaboration. He has also coached the Italian Giuseppe Gibilisco (2003-2007 and 2011) and the Russian Yelena Isinbayeva (2005-2010). He was main coach of the Pole vault Centre in Formia, Italy.

In 2007 he received the award from International Association of Athletics Federations the IAAF Coaches Award for his achievements with Isinbayeva. In 2010 he started to coached in Italy the Brazilian pole vaulter Fabiana Murer, she became the fourth pole vaulter brought to World Championships to Petrov.

== Technique ==
Petrov's innovation in the pole vault was the swing of the vaulter's legs later into the vault, thus retaining more of the energy and depending less on the recoil effect of the bent pole.

== Achievements ==
Athlete	Year	Competition	Venue	Event	Result	Measure	Notes
(Soviet Union) Sergey Bubka	1983	World Championships	(Finland) Helsinki	Pole vault	1st	5.70 m	
(Soviet Union) Sergey Bubka	1987	World Championships	(Italy) Rome	Pole vault	1st	5.85 m	
(Soviet Union) Sergey Bubka	1988	Olympic Games	(South Korea) Seoul	Pole vault	1st	5.90 m	
(Italy) Giuseppe Gibilisco	2003	World Championships	(France) Paris	Pole vault	1st	5.90 m	
(Italy) Giuseppe Gibilisco	2004	Olympic Games	(Greece) Athens	Pole vault	3rd	5.85 m	
(Russia) Yelena Isinbayeva	2005	World Championships	(Finland) Helsinki	Pole vault	1st	5.01 m	
(Russia) Yelena Isinbayeva	2007	World Championships	(Japan) Osaka	Pole vault	1st	4.80 m	
(Russia) Yelena Isinbayeva	2008	Olympic Games	(China) Beijing	Pole vault	1st	5.05 m	
(Brazil) Fabiana Murer	2011	World Championships	(South Korea) Daegu	Pole vault	1st	4.80 m	=
(Brazil) Fabiana Murer	2015	World Championships	(China) Beijing	Pole vault	2nd	4.85	
(Brazil) Thiago Braz	2016	Olympic Games	(Brazil) Rio de Janeiro	Pole vault	1st	6.03 m	
(Brazil) Thiago Braz	2021	Olympic Games	(Japan) Tokyo	Pole vault	3rd	5.87 m	
(Philippines) Ernest John Obiena	2022	World Championships	(United States) Eugene	Pole vault	3rd	5.94 m	AR
(Philippines) Ernest John Obiena	2023	World Championships	(Hungary) Budapest	Pole vault	2nd	6.00 m	=AR
