= Chhun Bunthorn =

Cambodian athletics player

Personal information
- Native name: ឈុន ប៊ុនថន
- Full name: Chhun Bunthorn
- Nationality: Cambodian
- Born: 31 May 1993 (age 33) Prey Veng, Cambodia
- Home town: Phnom Penh, Cambodia

Sport
- Country: Cambodia
- Sport: Track and field
- Event: Sprints

Achievements and titles
- Personal best: 800 m: 1:50.09 NR (Bangkok 2023)
Medal record
Representing Cambodia
Men's athletics
SEA Games
Gold medal – first place	2023 Cambodia	800 m

Chhun Bunthorn (Khmer: ឈុន ប៊ុនថន) is a Cambodian track and field sprinter. He is the first Cambodian to win the gold medal at the athletics event in SEA Games history.

== Career ==
He competed at the 2017 SEA Games in triathlon and finished last with 2:44.32. He then competed at the 2018 ASEAN University Games as a track and field sprinter. At the 2019 SEA Games, he participated in the 800 m and 1,500 m events. He finished 4th in the 1,500 metres event and 5th in the 800 metres event, clocking 1:52.33 which is his then personal best. At the 2021 SEA Games, he finished 6th in the 800 meters final, clocking 1:59.14.

At the 2023 SEA Games, he clocked his then personal best, 1:52.17, at the 800 meters event in heat 2, finishing first and advanced to the final. In the final, he finished first, timing 1:52.91, to win a gold medal and become the first Cambodian athlete to win a gold medal at the athletics event.

At the 2023 Asian Athletics Championships, he set another new record, 1:50.09 at the 800 m event, finishing 5th in the heat and 11th overall.

== Personal life ==
Born in a poor family in Prey Veng province, he says that his dream was actually to become an architect and he got a university scholarship for two years in 2012 but it was for engineering. He was then forced to give up his studies and his dreams because he couldn't afford the school's tuition after the scholarship was over. This job required that he take photographs and write some sports news articles, so in his spare time he took classes with the department of media and communications at the Royal University of Phnom Penh. he always loved to study and has a deep appreciation for knowledge – got interested in drawing when he learned about the history of photography and how it was actually related to it. Every weekend he went to learn drawing at the Champey Academy of Arts, hoping that this would help him to have a better understanding of frame when taking photographs. But when he holds the chapey dang veng – a traditional Khmer instrument that looks like a long necked guitar – while wearing Khmer-style clothes, he captivates listeners with the sound of his music and singing.
