= Sukanya Sang-nguen =

Thai sprinter

Personal information
- Nationality: Thai
- Born: 10 September 1966 (age 59)

Sport
- Sport: Sprinting
- Event: 4 × 400 metres relay
Medal record
Women's athletics
Representing Thailand
Asian Championships
Bronze medal – third place	1991 Kuala Lumpur	4×400 m

Sukanya Sang-nguen (born 10 September 1966) is a Thai sprinter. She competed in the women's 4 × 400 metres relay at the 1992 Summer Olympics.
