= Yothin Yaprajan =

Thai middle-distance runner

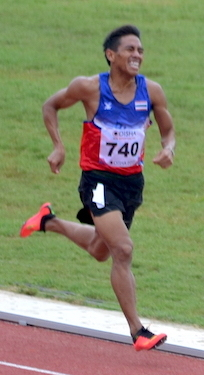
- Yothin Yaprajan in 2017

Personal information
- Nationality: Thai
- Born: 8 May 1992 (age 34)

Sport
- Sport: Athletics
- Event: 1500 metres

Yothin Yaprajan (Thai: โยธิน ยาประจันทร์; born 8 May 1992) is a Thai middle-distance runner.

== International competitions ==
Year	Competition	Venue	Position	Event	Notes
Representing Thailand
2013	Southeast Asian Games	Naypyidaw, Myanmar	4th	800 m	1:51.91
2013	Southeast Asian Games	Naypyidaw, Myanmar	5th	1500 m	4:00.94
2015	Southeast Asian Games	Singapore	3rd	800 m	1:52.32
2015	Southeast Asian Games	Singapore	3rd	1500 m	3:49.35
2017	Asian Championships	Bhubaneswar, India	9th	1500 m	3:55.61
2017	Asian Indoor and Martial Arts Games	Ashgabat, Turkmenistan	10th (h)	1500 m	3:59.82
2018	Asian Games	Jakarta, Indonesia	20th (h)	800 m	1:53.71
2018	Asian Games	Jakarta, Indonesia	20th (h)	1500 m	4:01.41
2019	Asian Championships	Doha, Qatar	10th (h)	1500 m	3:55.49

== Personal bests ==
Outdoor

- 800m - 1:51.30 (Bangkok 2013)
- 1000m - 2:25.20 (Poland 2019)
- 1500m - 3:49.35 (Singapore 2015)

Indoor

- 1500m - 3:59.82 (Ashgabat 2017)
