= Meas Kheng =

Cambodian athlete (born 1946)

Personal information
- Nationality: Cambodian
- Born: 28 March 1946 (age 80)

Sport
- Sport: Sprinting
- Event: 100 metres

Meas Kheng (born 28 March 1946) is a Cambodian sprinter who made history as the first woman to represent Cambodia at the Olympics. She competed in the women's 100 metres at the 1972 Summer Olympics.

She was dubbed the "sprint queen" of Southeast Asia, in the early 1970s.

At just seventeen, Kheng reached the finals of the 400 metres at the 1963 GANEFO Games in Jakarta. Her recorded time of 62.1 seconds still stands as the Cambodian junior record.

On July 19, 1968, in Phnom Penh, Meas Kheng clocked 12.0 seconds to set the current Cambodian 100-metre hand-timed record, which remains unbroken to this day.

At the 1971 SEAP Games, Kheng clinched gold with a time of the 100 metres and in a national record of 25.05 seconds. Her 200-metre time of 25.1 seconds shaved 0.3 seconds off the previous championship record. In the 400 metres, she finished second behind Malaysia's Junaidah Aman, clocking 58.1 seconds.

Confusion surrounds about Kheng's best times, and little news about her had emerged. On the eve of the 1973 SEAP Games, reports stated that Kheng's season bests were 12.0 seconds over 100 metres, 25.4 seconds over 200 metres, and 54.3 seconds over 400 metres. But on the eve of the Games debut, the Khmer team's chef de mission emphasised his athletes' unpreparedness as a result of the ongoing civil war, and claimed Kheng's season bests as 12.6 seconds in the 100 metres, 25.1 seconds for the 200 metres, and 57.6 seconds for the 400 metres. Said Kheng: "I am very bad this time. No time for training. I fight in war." Despite this, she arrived at the 1973 Southeast Asian Peninsular Games as the clear favourite, tipped for a gold-medal treble. Unfortunately, she pulled a muscle during the 100-metre final and was forced to withdraw from the rest of the competition.
