= Nary Ly =

Cambodian long-distance runner

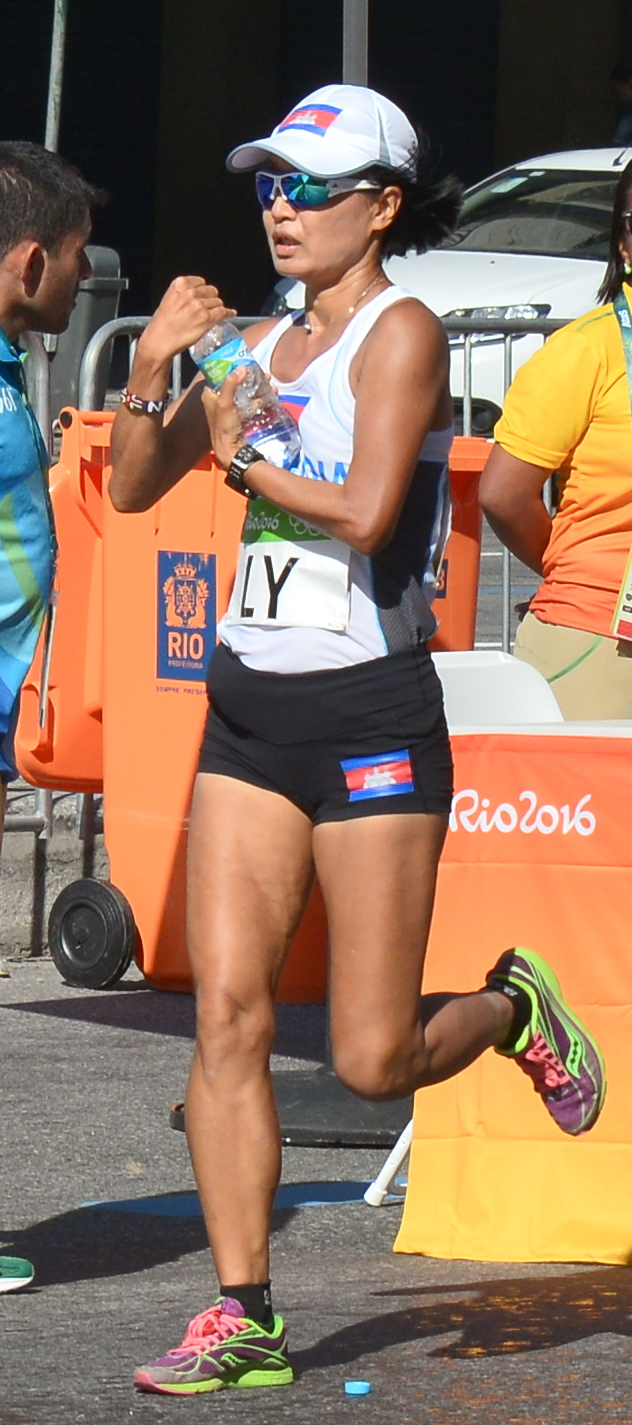
- Ly at the 2016 Olympics

Personal information
- Born: 6 June 1972 (age 54) Phnom Penh, Cambodia
- Height: 1.60 m (5 ft 3 in)
- Weight: 55 kg (121 lb)

Sport
- Country: Cambodia
- Sport: Athletics
- Event: Marathon

Achievements and titles
- Personal best: 2:59:42 (2015)

Nary Ly (born 6 June 1972) is a Cambodian long-distance runner. She finished in last place in the 2016 Olympic marathon of the 133 athletes to complete the course.
