= Hariharan Krishna =

Singaporean sprinter (born 1999)

Personal information
- Born: 6 July 1998 (age 27) Singapore
- Education: Bachelors In Engineering; Ngee Ann Polytechnic
- Occupations: Athlete; Military Expert
- Years active: 2023 – Present
- Parent: Krishna (father)

Sport
- Country: Singapore
- Sport: Athletics
- Event: 800 metres
Medal record
Men's athletics
Representing Singapore
Singapore Open Athletics Championships
Silver medal – second place	2023 Singapore	800 metres

Hariharan Krishna (born 6 July 1998) is a Singaporean athlete specialising in sprints. He also competed at the 2023 Southeast Asian Games representing Singapore at the 800 metres final event. He also won a silver medal for Singapore at the Singapore Open Athletics Championships in 2023.

== Early life ==
Hariharan Krishna was born and raised in Singapore to an Indian - Tamil speaking family. During his teenage years Hariharan studied at Ngee Ann Polytechnic where he pursued bachelors in engineering and graduated from the education institution in 2021.

== Personal life ==
Before pursuing his career as an athlete he graduated from National service in Singapore as an SAF Specialist and Military Expert. After his graduation and years in the military he shifted his attention to sports.

== Athletic career ==
In 2023, Hariharan won a silver medal for Singapore at the 800 metres event at the "Singapore Open Athletics Championships" which took place at the National Stadium, Singapore while Wan Fazri won the gold medal and Shawn Chia Wei En winning bronze. Hariharan speed recorded was 1:59.60.

Later that year he competed in the 2023 Southeast Asian Games as a debut athlete representing Singapore. He competed in the first 800 metres heat round where he later clocked his best time 1:57.68 and was selected to compete in the 800 metres final. He later completed in the final round of 800 metres and finished 9th place.
