= Niti Piyapan =

Thai sprinter (born 1972)

Personal information
- Nationality: Thai
- Born: 20 June 1972 (age 54)

Sport
- Sport: Sprinting
- Event: 4 × 100 metres relay
Medal record
Men's athletics
Representing Thailand
Asian Championships
Silver medal – second place	1991 Kuala Lumpur	4×100 m
Silver medal – second place	1995 Jakarta	4×100 m
Bronze medal – third place	1993 Manila	4×100 m

Niti Piyapan (Thai: นิธิ ปิยะพันธ์, born 20 June 1972) is a Thai sprinter. He competed in the men's 4 × 100 metres relay at the 1992 Summer Olympics.
