= Elieser Wattebosi =

Indonesian sprinter (born 1964)

Personal information
- Nationality: Indonesian
- Born: 20 August 1964 (age 61)

Sport
- Sport: Sprinting
- Event: 400 metres

Elieser Wattebosi (born 20 August 1964) is an Indonesian sprinter. He competed in the men's 400 metres at the 1988 Summer Olympics.
