= Mervin Guarte =

Filipino middle distance runner (1991–2025)

Personal information
- Nationality: Filipino
- Born: Mervin Maligo Guarte; March 8, 1992 Bongabong, Oriental Mindoro, Philippines
- Died: January 7, 2025 (aged 32) Calapan, Oriental Mindoro, Philippines

Sport
- Country: Philippines
- Sport: Track and field Obstacle course racing
- Event(s): 800m 1500m
Medal record
Men's obstacle course racing
Representing Philippines
SEA Games
Gold medal – first place	2019 Philippines	5km
Gold medal – first place	2023 Cambodia	Team
Men's athletics
Representing Philippines
South East Asian Games
Silver medal – second place	2011 Palembang	1500m
Silver medal – second place	2011 Palembang	800m
Silver medal – second place	2013 Naypyidaw	800m
Silver medal – second place	2015 Singapore	1500m
Silver medal – second place	2015 Singapore	800m
Bronze medal – third place	2017 Kuala Lumpur	1500m

Mervin Maligo Guarte (March 8, 1992 – January 7, 2025) was a Filipino middle distance runner and obstacle course racer.

== Career ==
Guarte's first national competition was the 2008 Palarong Pambansa in Palawan when he was still a secondary student. In the preliminaries he broke a 1997 record for the 800m with 1:55.6. He however failed to win the gold medal. He caught the attention of the Philippine Sports Commission the following year despite this.

He ran for the San Sebastian College – Recoletos in the National Collegiate Athletic Association (NCAA).

Guarte was a frequent competitor in the SEA Games. In athletics, he achieved silver medals in the 800m in 2011, 2013, and 2015 editions, and in the 1500m in 2011 and 2015 editions. He placed bronze in the 1500m in 2017.

Guarte ran in the 2017 Asian Indoor and Martial Arts Games in Turkmenistan.

He was encouraged to switch to obstacle course racing (OCR) by Albert Agra of the Pilipinas Obstacle Sports Federation after a SEA Games gold medal remained elusive.

Now competing in OCR, Guarte won gold in the men's 5km race in the 2019 edition and another in the men's team in the 2023 edition.

Guarte also was a participant of 2013 Stags Run and won the third run of the event. The 10-kilometer race was known as "Takbo Para sa Bokasyon".

== Personal life and death ==
Guarte hailed from Calapan, Oriental Mindoro and was a resident of Naujan of the same province. Guarte was part of the Philippine Air Force. He was a non-commissioned officer (Airman First Class) and was stationed at the Basilio Fernando Air Base at the time of his death. He was married to Kristine Almeranias for 13 years and had two children with her.

Guarte died after having been stabbed by an intruder while sleeping at a friend's house in Calapan, on January 7, 2025. He was 32. The suspect is Dionisio Refel Calooy, a 31-year old male motorized tricycle driver who is believed to have a personal grudge on Guarte.

== Competition record ==
Year	Competition	Venue	Position	Event	Notes
Representing the Philippines
2011	Summer Universiade	Shenzhen, China	36th (h)	800 m	1:53.32
2011	Summer Universiade	Shenzhen, China	30th (h)	1500 m	1:53.32
2011	SEA Games	Palembang, Indonesia	2nd	800 m	1:50.69
2011	SEA Games	Palembang, Indonesia	2nd	1500 m	3:47.65
2013	Asian Championships	Pune, India	17th (h)	800 m	1:58.44
2013	SEA Games	Naypyidaw, Myanmar	2nd	800 m	1:51.51
2015	SEA Games	Singapore	2nd	800 m	1:51.47
2015	SEA Games	Singapore	2nd	1500 m	3:48.06
2016	Asian Beach Games	Danang, Vietnam	14th	Cross country	20:58.15
2017	SEA Games	Kuala Lumpur, Malaysia	3rd	1500 m	3:53.68
2017	Asian Indoor and Martial Arts Games	Ashgabat, Turkmenistan	5th (h)	1500 m	4:04.76
