= Samorn Kieng =

Cambodian middle-distance runner

Samorn Kieng (born 4 March 1983 in Kandal Province) is a Cambodian middle-distance runner. He competed in the men's 800 m event at the 2012 Summer Olympics but was eliminated in the first round. However, Samorn did finish with a season's best time of 1:55.26.

Samorn took part in the 2012 IAAF World Indoor Championships where he broke the national record with a time of 1:59.14 even though Samorn was eliminated in the first round. He also ran in the heats of the event at the 2013 World Championships in Athletics.
