= Shanti Govindasamy =

Malaysian sprinter

Medal record

Women's athletics

Representing Malaysia

Asian Championships
Bronze medal – third place	1993 Manila	4×400 m
Bronze medal – third place	1998 Fukuoka	100 m

Shanti Govindasamy (Tamil: ஜி.சாந்தி; born 19 September 1967) is a female sprint athlete who competed for Malaysia at the Asian Games, primarily in the 100 and 200 metre events. Married to R.Kannan a/l P. Rajoo. She has two children; Vinooshana and Thevisshana

== International competitions ==
- GOLD 200m 1991 Southeast Asian Games Manila, Philippines
- SILVER 100m 1991 Southeast Asian Games Manila, Philippines
- SILVER 100m 1993 SEA Games in Singapore
- SILVER 200m 1993 SEA Games in Singapore
- GOLD 4 × 400 m 1993 SEA Games in Singapore
- GOLD 100m 1997 SEA Games in Jakarta, Indonesia
- GOLD 200m 1997 SEA Games in Jakarta, Indonesia
- SILVER 4x400 1997 SEA Games in Jakarta, Indonesia
- BRONZE 100m 1998 Asian Athletics Championships in Fukuoka, Japan
- Fourth place 100m 1998 Asian Games in Bangkok, Thailand
- Fourth place 200m 1998 Asian Games in Bangkok, Thailand
