= Robi Syianturi =

Indonesian long-distance runner

Personal information
- Full name: Robi Syianturi
- Nationality: Indonesia
- Born: 8 January 1998 (age 28) Belitung

Sport
- Country: Indonesia
- Sport: Long-distance running
- Events: 5,000 m, 10,000 m, Half Marathon, Marathon

Achievements and titles
- Personal bests: 1,500 m: 3:51.62 (2024); 5,000 m: 14:24.04 (2023); 10,000 m: 29:55.31 (2023); 10 km road: 29:55 (2020); Half Marathon: 1:03:24 (2025, NR); Marathon: 2:12:20 (2026, NR)
Medal record
Men's athletics
Representing Indonesia
SEA Games
Gold medal – first place	2025 Thailand	Marathon
Bronze medal – third place	2023 Cambodia	5,000 m

Robi Syianturi (born 8 January 1998) is a professional male long-distance runner from Indonesia. He is the current Indonesian national record holder for the half marathon, which he achieved at the 2024 Gold Coast Marathon, and also the marathon, which he achieved at the 2025 Asics Gold Coast Marathon. Syianturi earned a bronze medal in the 5,000 m race during the 2023 SEA Games in Cambodia.

== Early life ==
Syianturi's athletic talent was discovered by his physical education teacher in 2014 in his hometown on the island of Belitung. At that time, Syianturi was more interested in football than long-distance running.

== Career ==
=== 2021 ===
==== PON ====
Syianturi made his first podium appearance at the 2021 PON event in Papua, representing the province of Bangka Belitung Islands. Although he did not win a gold medal, Syianturi managed to win one silver medal for the 1,500 m race and one bronze medal for the 5,000 m race.

=== 2023 ===
==== SEA Games ====
At the 2023 SEA Games in Cambodia, Syianturi won a bronze medal for the 5,000 m race with a time of 14:43:44.

=== 2024 ===
==== Tokyo Marathon ====
Syianturi competed in the 2024 Tokyo Marathon, which was held in Tokyo, on 3 March 2024. He was the 100th finisher in his debut at the Tokyo Marathon with a time of 2:24:18. Syianturi is ranked 100th out of a total of 38,000 Tokyo Marathon participants.

==== Gold Coast Marathon ====
Syianturi broke the Indonesian national record for the half marathon at the 2024 Gold Coast Marathon with a time of 1:04:48. The previous record had been 1:05:34, set by Eduardus Nabunome in 1997 at the same event.

==== PON ====
At the 2024 PON, Syianturi won three medals for the province of Bangka Belitung Islands, a silver medal for the 1,500 m race, a bronze medal for the 5,000 m race, and a gold medal for the 10,000 m race. Syianturi won the gold medal after beating Rikki Marthin Luther Simbolon by only 0.01 seconds.

==== Valencia Marathon ====
After breaking the half marathon record earlier in the year, Syianturi broke the Indonesian national record for the marathon with a time of 2:17:16, breaking the previous record set by Eduardus Nabunome in 1993.
