= Edward Lasquete =

Filipino pole vaulter

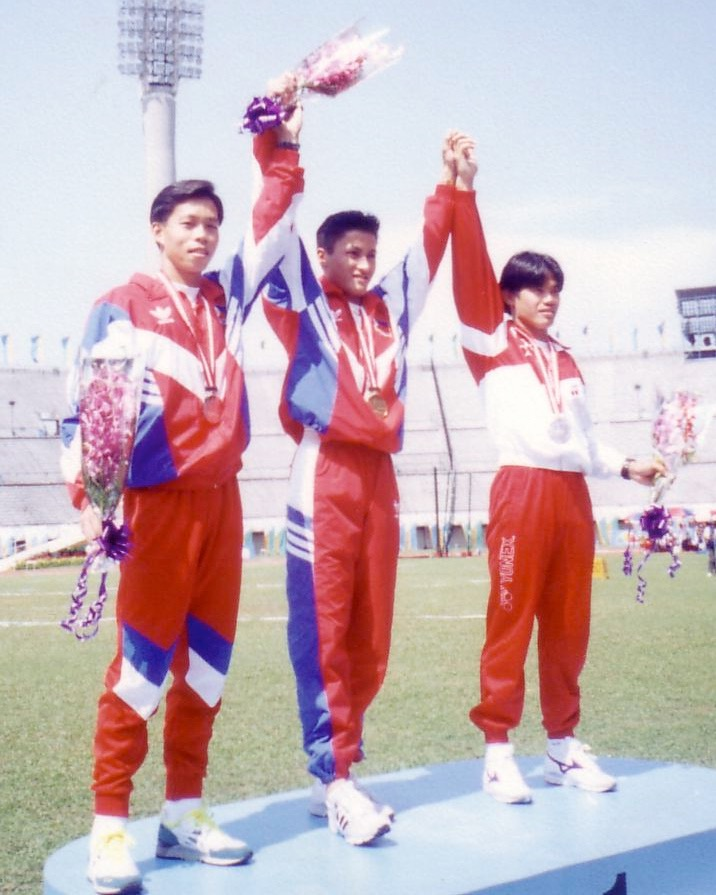
- Lasquete, Gold Medal performance 1993 SEAG Singapore

Personal information
- Nickname: Ed Lasquete
- Born: December 31, 1971 (age 54)

Sport
- Country: Philippines
- Sport: Track and Field
- Event: Pole Vault
- University team: California Polytechnic State University
- Club: Cardinal Track Club San Jose Track Club

Achievements and titles
- Personal best: 5.40m (1997)
Medal record
Men's athletics
Representing Philippines
Southeast Asian Games
Gold medal – first place	1991 Manila	Pole vault
Gold medal – first place	1993 Singapore	Pole vault
Gold medal – first place	1995 Thailand	Pole vault
Silver medal – second place	1997 Jakarta	Pole vault

Edward Lasquete is a Filipino-American Pole Vaulter who competed at the 1992 Summer Olympics in Barcelona, Spain. At the Olympics, he was not able to make a podium finish, but set a National Record in Pole Vault by registering a record of 5.0 meters. He is the first Southeast Asian in history to break the 5.0 meter mark in the Pole Vault. This record would only be broken 22 years later in 2014 by Ernest Obiena.

Lasquete attended Mt. Pleasant High School in San Jose, California where in 1990 he bagged the title of California State Champion. He then went on to California Polytechnic State University at San Luis Obispo. Coached by 1972 Olympic bronze medalist in the pole vault, Jan Johnson, Lasquete secured a spot as an NCAA All American. Lasquete also won gold in the pole vault event of the 1991 Southeast Asian Games, 1993 Southeast Asian Games, and 1995 Southeast Asian Games. He settled for the Silver at the 1997 Southeast Asian Games.

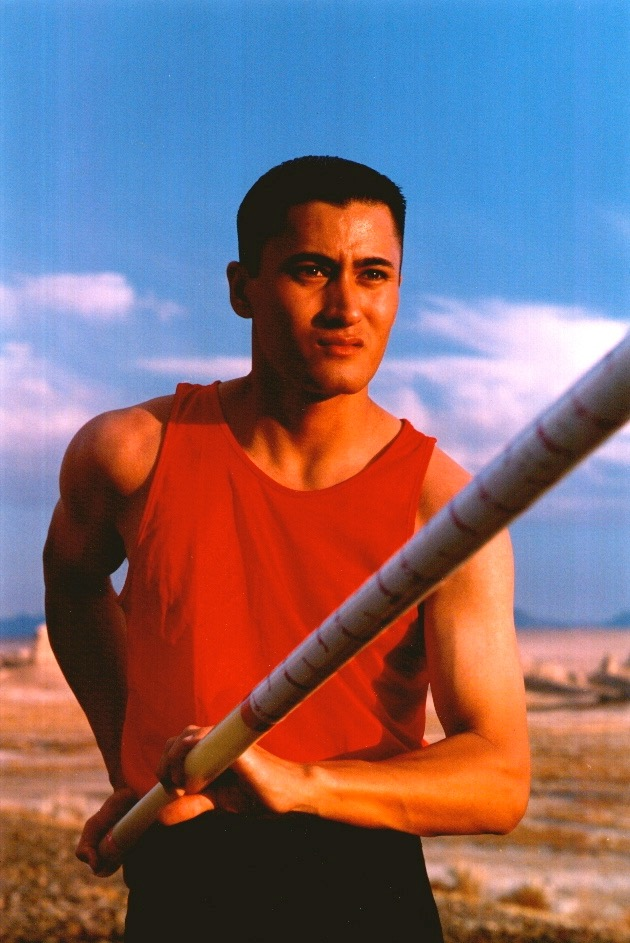
Edward Lasquete on location Mohave Desert
