= Philippines at the World Athletics Championships =

- Flag of Philippines
- WA code: PHI
- Medals: Gold 0 Silver 1 Bronze 1 Total 2

World Athletics Championships appearances (overview)
- 1983; 1987; 1991; 1993; 1995; 1997; 1999; 2001; 2003; 2005; 2007; 2009; 2011; 2013; 2015; 2017; 2019; 2022; 2023; 2025

The Philippines have taken part in all but one editions of the World Athletics Championships, missing only the 1999 edition.

Their first ever medal came in 2022, by the pole vaulter EJ Obiena, when he finished 3rd in the men's pole vault event. Obiena went to only the silver medal the following edition, being to this date the only Filipino athlete to stand on the podium at the World Championships.

== Medalists ==
Medal	Name	Year	Event
Bronze	EJ Obiena	2022 Eugene	Men's pole vault
Silver	EJ Obiena	2023 Budapest	Men's pole vault

=== By event ===
Event	Gold	Silver	Bronze	Total
Pole vault	0	1	1	2
Totals (1 entries)	0	1	1	2

=== By gender ===
Gender	Gold	Silver	Bronze	Total
Men	0	1	1	2
Women	0	0	0	0

== Best placings ==
Event	Men's placing	Male athlete	Women's placing	Female athlete
100 m	—N/a		8th (QF)	Lydia De Vega (1983)
200 m	—N/a		7th (QF)	Lydia De Vega (1983)
400 m	7th (QF)	Isidro del Prado (1983)	—N/a	
800 m	7th (H)	John Lozada (2001)	—N/a	
5000 m	7th (H)	Eduardo Buenavista (2003)	—N/a	
400 m hurdles	7th (H)	Eric Cray (2015)	7th (H)	Elma Muros (1991)
3000 m s'chase	11th (H)	Hector Begeo (1997)	—N/a	
Pole vault	2nd place, silver medalist(s)	EJ Obiena (2023)	—N/a	
Long jump	—N/a		7th (q)	Marestella Sunang (2005)
Discus throw	—N/a		11th (q)	Dorie Cortejo (1987)
Hammer throw	20th	Agustin Jarina (1995)	—N/a	
Javelin throw	19th	Romeo Montanes (1987)	—N/a	

Source: World Athletics

== See also ==
- Philippines at the Olympics
- Philippines at the Paralympics
