= PhilSports Complex =

National sports complex of the Philippines

Coordinates: 14°34′43″N 121°4′0″E

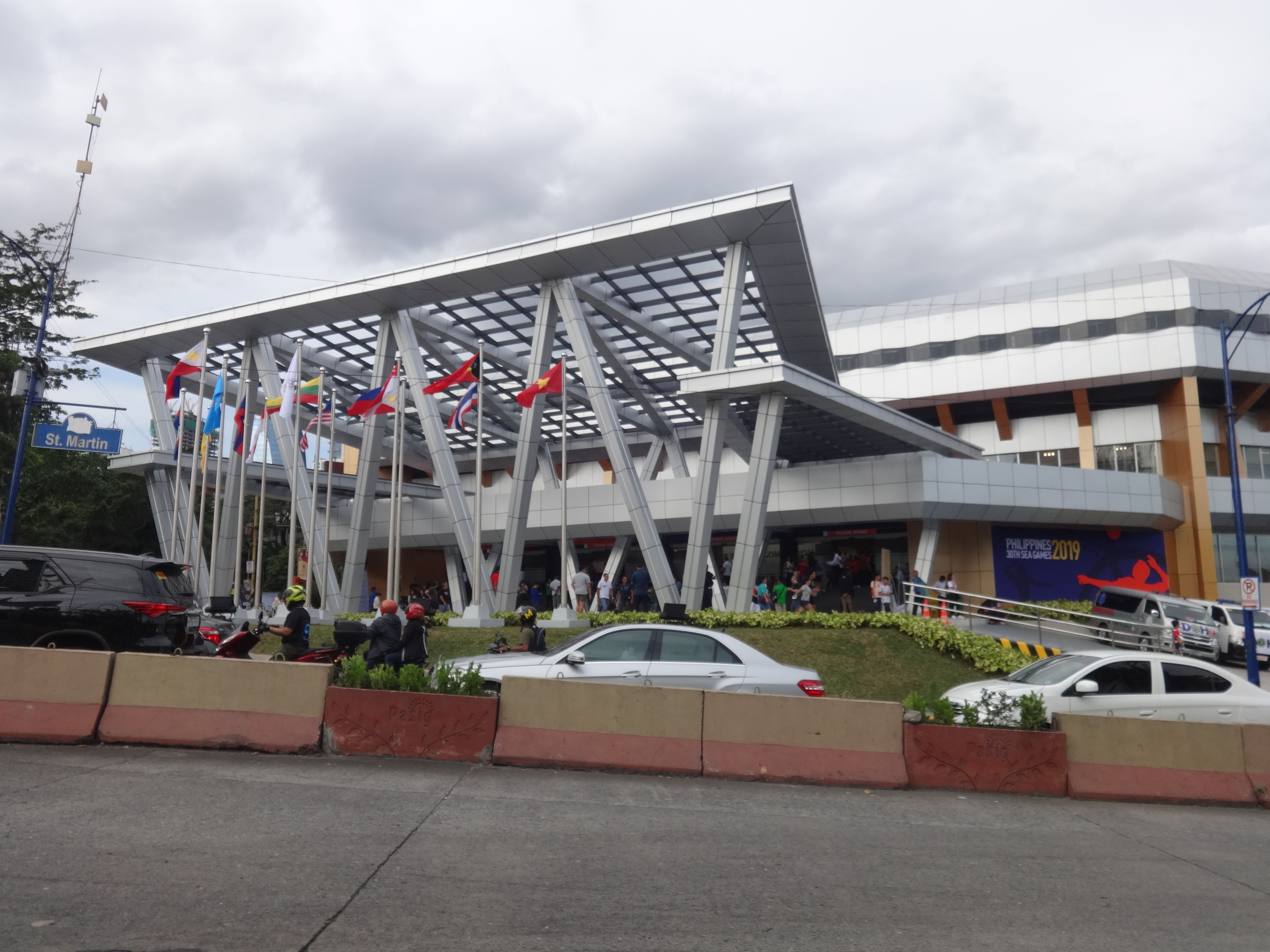
- PhilSports Arena
- Interactive map of PhilSports Complex
- Full name: Philippine Institute of Sports Complex
- Location: Pasig, Metro Manila, Philippines
- Facilities: PhilSports Football and Athletics Stadium; PhilSports Arena; PhilSports Swimming Center

Construction
- Built: 1985
- Opened: 1985
- Renovated: 2010, 2012, 2015, 2019, 2025

Tenants
- Philippine Sports Commission; Philippine Olympic Committee

The Philippine Institute of Sports Complex (also known as the PhilSports Complex) is a national sports complex of the Philippines. It is located in Meralco Avenue in Pasig, Metro Manila, Philippines. It is where the offices of the Philippine Sports Commission, Philippine Olympic Committee and some national sports associations are located.

PhilSports Complex facilities are purposely built to cater the Filipino athletes’ needs from training facilities to living quarters. By virtue of Republic Act 6847, which created the Philippines Sports Commission, was to develop and maintain a fully equipped sports facility. Due to its proximity to business districts of Makati and Ortigas, the arena is also used in concerts and conventions.

== History ==
=== 20th century ===
==== 1970s ====
The complex was actually the sports field of a defunct school named Saint Martin's Integrated School (Elementary and High School). The school was transferred by First Lady Imelda Marcos during the 1970s and the school was reorganized as the University of Life, a vocational school.

==== 1980–1999 ====
In 1985, the Philippine Basketball Association became main tenants of the PhilSports Arena after nine years at the Araneta Coliseum. The venue attracted standing-room only crowds during their stay. The PBA stayed for seven years until they moved to the newly built Cuneta Astrodome in 1993, citing the venue's lack of maintenance.

After the events of the 1986 People Power Revolution, the University of Life was closed. However, the sports complex was transferred to the Philippine Sports Commission in preparation for the 1991 Southeast Asian Games. Several names were applied at the complex. These were The ULTRA (University of Life Training and Recreational Arena), PSC-National Academy of Sports (PSC-NAS) and PSC Sports Complex. Due to confusion to the public especially in concerts, the commission decided to adopt a permanent name, PhilSports.

=== 21st century ===
==== 2000s ====
The sports complex reached its maximum audience space when the Asian pop group F4 and Taiwanese local star Barbie Hsu staged a concert in the facility in September 2003. It was one of the venues of the 2005 Southeast Asian Games which was held from November 27, 2005, to December 5, 2005. It hosted the games' badminton event.

==== PhilSports stampede ====
On February 4, 2006, the PhilSports Complex became the site of a deadly stampede that killed 73 people and injured about 400. Wowowee, the now-defunct early afternoon game show of television network ABS-CBN, was scheduled to hold its first anniversary show at the complex. Attracted by the large prizes given out during the show, crowds of people waited for days just outside the stadium. As the opening of the gates neared a few hours before the show, the crowd surged forward crushing those at the front of the queue underfoot. The cause of the stampede is still being determined pending investigation.

==== 2010s ====
The PhilSports Arena in 2012.

There was a plan by the Philippine Sports Commission to put up of a beach volleyball court inside the track and field oval of the PhilSports Football and Athletics Stadium, a proposal opposed by the Philippine Athletics Track and Field Association (PATAFA). PATAFA President, and Philippine Super Liga Chairman Philip Ella Juico said that the construction of the sand court may hamper the athletics national team's preparations.

The complex underwent a major renovation, prior to its hosting of some events of the 2019 Southeast Asian Games.

==== 2020s ====
The PhilSports Complex was closed due to the COVID-19 pandemic.

The sports complex was renovated in 2025. The track oval was reopened in August 2025. The weight training area was re-inaugurated as the National Athletic Center and the Bagong Pilipinas Gymnasium in November 2025. The Dorm H was also refurbished. The National Sports Museum was also relocated to the PhilSports Complex from Rizal Memorial Sports Complex.

== Facilities ==
=== Sports venues ===
Venue	Purpose	Seating capacity	Year built	Notes
PhilSports Arena	Multi-use	10,000	1985	
PhilSports Football and Athletics Stadium	Multi-use, primarily athletics and football	15,000	1985	
PhilSports Swimming Center	Aquatic sports venue	–	–	
Philsports Fencing Hall	Gymnasium for fencing	–	–	
National Athletic Center	Gymnasium	–	–	

== See also ==
- Rizal Memorial Sports Complex
- New Clark City Sports Hub
- PhilSports Stadium stampede
