= James Michael Lafferty =

American businessman

- Born: 1963 (age 62–63); United States
- Education: St. Xavier High School; University of Cincinnati
- Occupations: Business Executive, Speaker, Columnist, and Olympic Athletics Coach
- Spouse: Caroline Lafferty
- Website: jamesmichaellafferty.com

James Michael Lafferty (born 1963) is an American business executive and athletics coach. He served as the chief executive officer of Fine Hygienic Holding from 2018 to 2025 and previously held regional CEO positions at Procter & Gamble, the Coca-Cola Company and British American Tobacco. Lafferty has also been a competitive athlete and a coach of Olympic-level athletes.

== Education ==
Lafferty graduated from St. Xavier High School in Cincinnati in 1981. He graduated from the University of Cincinnati in 1985 with a bachelor's degree in psychology and physiology.

== Business ==
Lafferty began his career at Procter & Gamble, where he rose from being a corporate fitness instructor, through marketing management roles before moving into senior regional CEO positions at P&G, and subsequently the Coca-Cola Company and British American Tobacco. In 2018 he was appointed Chief Executive Officer of Fine Hygienic Holding (FHH), a Dubai-based hygiene and wellness company. The company expanded its operations under his leadership and received industry recognition.

Lafferty serves on the board of the Medical Wellness Association, an organization that has endorsed Fine Hygienic Holding products and a canned sardines brand. He has written opinion and lifestyle columns for The Philippine Star, a national newspaper in the Philippines.

Lafferty has been listed four times, most recently in 2024, as among top 100 CEOs by Forbes Middle East. Lafferty also won a Daman Corporate Health & Wellness Visionary Award in 2019. Lafferty has appeared on The Chrissy B Show, SKY 203, sharing his thoughts about the qualities needed to succeed. He was a speaker at AESC and Tissue World 2005.

=== Coaching ===
Lafferty was involved in preparing Filipino long jumper Marestella Torres for the 2016 Rio Olympics.

Lafferty has served as a long-time mentor and conditioning coach to Filipino pole vaulter EJ Obiena, working alongside Obiena's primary coach Vitaly Petrov since 2017. His involvement extends to training oversight, including physical conditioning and mental preparation. In 2022, Obiena formally introduced "Team EJ," a professional support group structured under Lafferty’s guidance to strengthen the athlete’s performance and commercial organization.

Lafferty also publicly defended Obiena during allegations of doping, stating Obiena had never tested positive and dismissing such claims as baseless. During the 2021–2022 dispute between Obiena and the Philippine Athletics Track and Field Association (PATAFA) over allegations of mis-liquidated coaching fees (EJ Obiena–PATAFA dispute), Lafferty publicly supported Obiena's position. He said that the issue stemmed from systemic problems in PATAFA's payment processes and advocated for direct payment to the coach instead of placing administrative burdens on the athlete. Lafferty also said that several other countries offered Obiena citizenship in response to the controversy, with offers made even before the dispute became public. Later, he challenged PATAFA's claims by stating that Obiena had overpaid his coach, by more than €2,800, due to delays and inefficiencies in federation disbursements.

He has also coached Nigerian marathon runner Esther Obiekwe, Nigeria's representative at the 2012 Boston and London Olympic marathons. In addition to elite athletes, Lafferty has worked with amateur marathoners such as Kristy Abello. Lafferty has been involved in the Philippine Athletics Track and Field Association's "Adopt an Olympian" program, as the program originator, which provided private sector backing to athletes.

== Competition ==
Lafferty participated in several sports before turning to distance running, completing more than 30 marathons. He later transitioned to competitive powerlifting and won a Philippine national championship in 2017.

Competing internationally as a masters athlete, Lafferty won three consecutive world titles in strict arm curl from 2023 through 2025. He also competed in bench press and set United Arab Emirates national records in both bench press and strict arm curl.

At the 2026 Raw Powerlifting World Championships in Ashland, Virginia, Lafferty competed in the men's 60–64 division and won three gold medals, taking the titles in strict arm curl, bench press and push-pull. More than 500 qualified lifters competed at the championships.

== Personal life ==
James Michael Lafferty is married and has several children, including an adopted Filipino orphan. In 2006 Lafferty performed CPR on a Filipino man suffering cardiac arrest at Nagoya airport.
