= Philippines at the 2022 World Athletics Championships =

- WA code: PHI
- National federation: Philippine Athletics Track and Field Association

in Eugene, United States 15–24 July 2022
- Competitors: 1 (1 man and 0 women) in 1 event
- Medals Ranked 40th: Gold 0 Silver 0 Bronze 1 Total 1

World Athletics Championships appearances (overview)
- 1983; 1987; 1991; 1993; 1995; 1997; 1999; 2001; 2003; 2005; 2007; 2009; 2011; 2013; 2015; 2017; 2019; 2022; 2023; 2025

The Philippines competed at the 2022 World Athletics Championships in Eugene, Oregon, United States, from 15 to 24 July 2022. The athlete delegation of the country was composed of one competitor, pole vaulter Ernest Obiena. He qualified upon recording a height that was within the standard during the qualification period.

Obiena competed in the qualifying round of the men's pole vault in Group B. There, he ranked in the top twelve and advanced to the finals of the event. In the finals, he placed third and won the bronze medal. This would be the Philippines' first medal at any edition of the World Athletics Championships.

== Background ==
The 2022 World Athletics Championships in Eugene, Oregon, United States, from 15 to 24 July 2022. To qualify for the World Championships, athletes had to reach an entry standard (e.g. time and distance), place in a specific position at select competitions, be a wild card entry, or qualify through their World Athletics Ranking at the end of the qualification period.

Pole vaulter EJ Obiena was the only athlete to compete for the team at the Championships. He qualified upon recording a mark that was within the qualifying standard of the event during the qualification period. Previously, he competed for the nation at the 2019 World Athletics Championships but did not advance to the finals of the event.

== Results ==
=== Men ===
Obiena competed in the qualifying round of the men's pole vault on 22 July in Group B. There, he qualified for the final round after he had recorded a height of 5.75 meters on his second attempt and was ranked within the top twelve performers in the round.

In the final two days later, Obiena cleared 5.94 meters on his second attempt setting a new Asian record, surpassing his own record by a centimeter. He placed third and won the bronze medal, becoming the first medalist from the Philippines at any edition of the World Athletics Championships. Obiena was able to clear the height after following the advice of his coach Vitaly Petrov to switch to a more flexible 5.25-meter stick which was bigger than his previous. He also tried clearing 6 meters but he failed to take off from the ground on all three attempts.

Obiena finished behind silver medalist Chris Nilsen of the United States who cleared an identical height but managed to do the same on his first, and gold medalist Armand Duplantis who set a new world record of 6.21 meters.

Field events

Athlete	Event	Qualification		Final	
Athlete	Event	Distance	Position	Distance	Position
Ernest Obiena	Pole vault	5.75	=6 q	5.94; AR	3rd place, bronze medalist(s)
