= EJ Obiena–PATAFA dispute =

Dispute between athlete and federation

Ernest John Obiena–PATAFA dispute
- Date: November 21, 2021 – March 30, 2022
- Type: Dispute between athlete and federation
- First reporter: Philippine Daily Inquirer
- Participants: Obiena camp: EJ Obiena (athlete); Vitaly Petrov (coach); PATAFA: Philip Juico (President); Mediation: Philippine Sports Commission

In late 2021, the Philippine Athletics Track and Field Association (PATAFA), led by President Philip Juico, initiated a dispute with Filipino pole vaulter EJ Obiena involving the liquidation of finances related to the salary of Obiena's coach Vitaliy Petrov.

The dispute became public in November 2021 when the Philippine Daily Inquirer reported that PATAFA demanded Obiena return financial assistance funds meant for Petrov, accusing the pole vaulter of falsifying liquidation reports and embezzlement. The accusation was strongly disputed by Obiena and Petrov.

The Philippine Sports Commission (PSC) has repeatedly attempted to arrange mediation for the two parties involved and the PSC even signed a Memorandum of Agreement with the Philippine Dispute Resolution Center (PDRC). However Obiena has declined mediation stating PATAFA is acting in bad faith. Obiena also noted that mediation is confidential and he would like the facts of the case to become public.

The Philippine Olympic Committee and its general assembly members after a full vote have declared Juico as persona non grata officially withdrawing its recognition of the PATAFA president due to evidence presented to its ethics committee involving Juico's behavior before and during the dispute. Evidence included that Juico had colluded to create untruthful statements. PATAFA responded by recommending the expulsion of Obiena from the national training pool.

Obiena hired the firm PricewaterhouseCoopers to verify the accounting and bank details involving Petrov and Obiena has submitted this liquidation report directly to the PSC, claiming it exonerates him. The Commission on Audit COA and the PSC are still reviewing Obiena's financial documents. On January 27, 2022, COA stated they scrutinized Obiena's financial reports and have found nothing irregular so far. On March 31, 2022, COA officially cleared Obiena of any wrongdoing.

== Due Process ==
In any athlete NSA dispute due process should be followed. PATAFA's By-laws do not explicitly state its dispute resolution mechanism for eligibility issues. However, as PATAFA is an IAAF Member, PATAFA must abide by the rules of the IAAF. Under the IAAF Rules on Disputes and Disciplinary Proceedings, disputes between athletes and their NSAs must be submitted to an impartial and fair hearing body, with the rights of the athlete respected at all times.

Under the IAAF rule 60 Disputes and Disciplinary Proceedings:

Disputes arising under the Rules and Regulations of a Member or Area Association

3. Each Member and Area Association shall incorporate a provision in its constitution that, unless otherwise stated in a specific Rule or Regulation, all disputes and disciplinary proceedings arising under the rules and regulations of the Member or Area Association involving athletes, athlete support personnel or other persons under its jurisdiction, however arising, shall be submitted to a hearing before the relevant hearing body constituted or otherwise authorised by the Member or Area Association, as the case may be. Such a hearing shall respect the following principles:

(a) a timely hearing before a fair and impartial hearing body;

(b) the right of the individual to be informed in a fair and timely manner of the charge against him;

(c) the right to present evidence, including the right to call and question witnesses;

(d) the right to be represented by legal counsel and an interpreter (at the individual's expense); and

(e) the right to a timely and reasoned decision in writing.

In the Obiena case it is unclear if the IAAF procedures of due process were followed. PATAFA stated that investigations were conducted by its Administrative Committee who then submitted a fact-finding Report to the PATAFA Board. Commentators questioned whether PATAFA's committee is an “impartial and fair hearing body”.

== Background ==
Obiena began training with coach Petrov in 2014. The PSC approved funding for Petrov but liquidation was supposed to be handled through PATAFA. On many occasions, due to accounting and currency exchange difficulties, Obiena requested PATAFA to directly pay Petrov as shown in email exchanges to PATAFA as early as June 8, 2020. Local Filipino coaches are often paid directly by PATAFA in Philippine Pesos, but Petrov is an international coach working in Italy and requires payment in Euros. Philippine Pesos cannot directly be exchanged into Euros, but must first be exchanged to dollars, then dollars converted to Euros. Bank wire and exchange fees cost an average of $50 per transfer, an expense that Obiena paid from his personal funds.

On Feb. 16, 2021 Juico stated:

There are a lot of papers he has to fill up in terms of liquidation. Ang dami dami niyan to satisfy the requirements of the PSC. Sometimes, you need a full time secretary just to go through this and he is doing all of that. There's a lot on his shoulders, it's not just competing. There are administrative details, looking for transport, stuff like that which should not bother him.

The PATAFA system required signed receipts prior to reimbursement, requiring the athlete to front the money for unexpected expenses. Petrov was aware of these payment difficulties with PATAFA and when contacted by Juico believed he was helping to improve PATAFA's inefficient system. No language translator was available to help Juico and Petrov, communicate during their meeting. These topics were never mentioned or acknowledged by Juico and further PATAFA deceptively modified email exchanges to make it appear Obiena never sent Petrov's banking details.

In Congressional hearings, Obiena noted that PATAFA had difficulties managing the needs of the team during the Tokyo Olympics. International flights and hotels arrangements were sometimes bungled. Obiena's poles were ordered and delivered late on several occasions, almost missing the Tokyo olympic deadline. Without poles Obiena would have been unable to compete in the Olympic events. These private PATAFA mistakes caused undue stress for the Obiena team.

== Start of the dispute ==
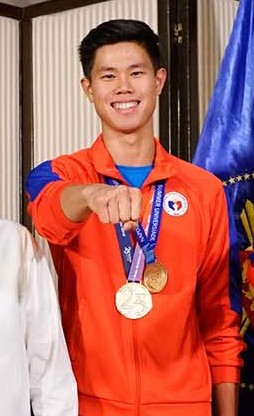
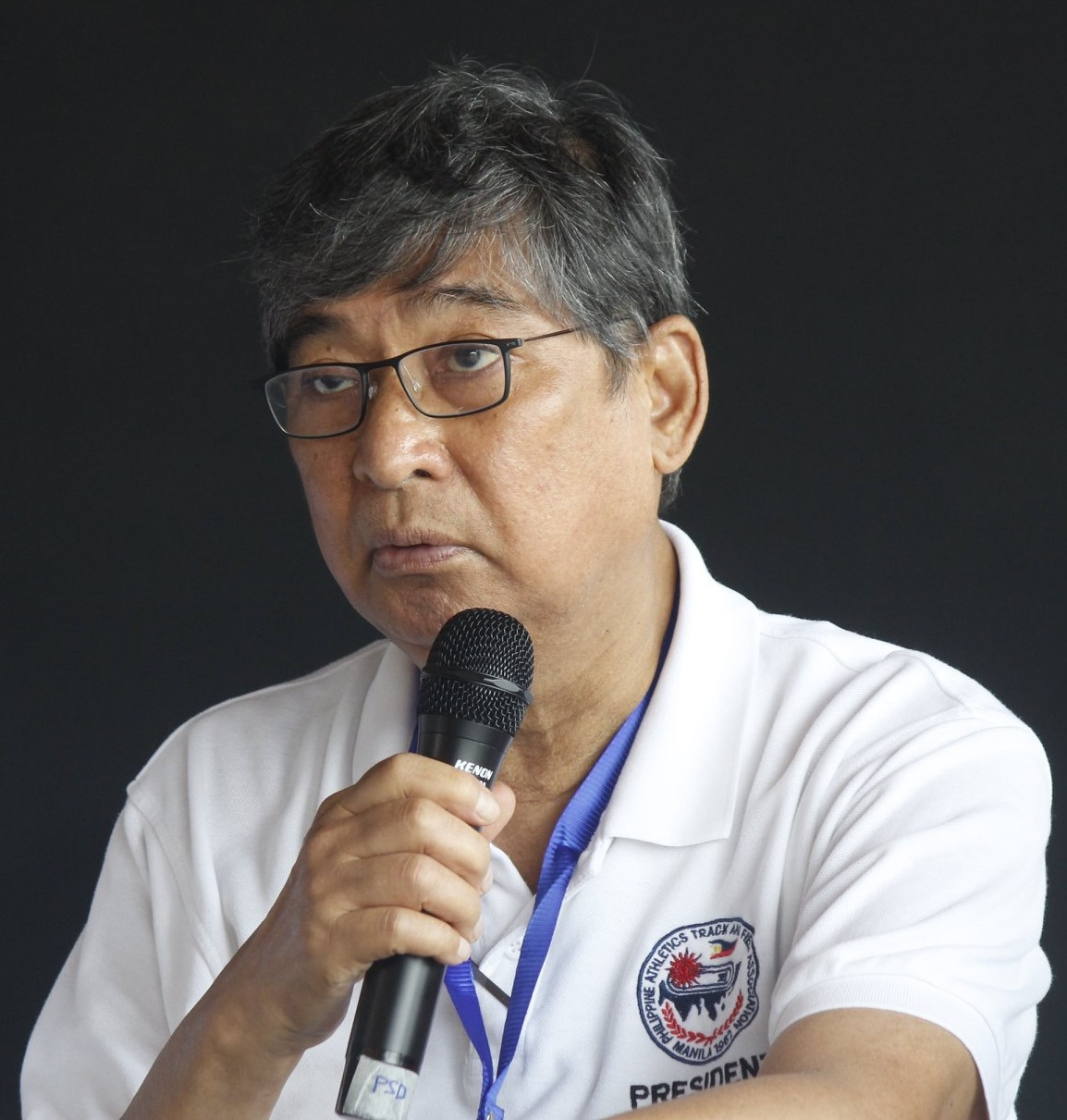
EJ Obiena (left) and Philip Juico (right)

Timeline of the Obiena–PATAFA dispute
- Sept. 8, 2021: PATAFA President Philip Juico talked with Obiena's coach Vitaliy Petrov and President of the Ukrainian NOC Sergey Bubka. According to Juico it was during this conversation with Petrov and Bubka that he learned about Petrov's salary issue.
- Nov. 21, 2021: Philippine Daily Inquirer reports that PATAFA has ordered to return funds meant for Petrov's coaching fees, accusing Obiena of falsifying liquidation documents and embellzement. This was denied by Obiena and coach Petrov.
- Dec. 28, 2021: The Philippine Olympic Committee declares Juico as persona non grata after its ethics committee conclude he harassed Obiena through "malicious" public accusations. This was ratified by the POC executive board on January 26, 2022.
- Jan. 4, 2022: PATAFA recommends the expulsion of Obiena from the national team pool. This decision was later deferred.
- Jan. 24, 2022: Efforts to start mediation between Obiena and PATAFA by the Philippine Sports Commission collapsed after Obiena withdrew from the procedure accusing the athletics federation of acting in bad faith.

In November 2021, a Philippine Daily Inquirer report stated that Philippine Athletics Track and Field Association (PATAFA) ordered pole vaulter EJ Obiena to return financial assistance worth €85,000 (over ₱4.8 million) allegedly due to "falsified the liquidations submitted" to the federation. PATAFA stated that Obiena has not paid Vitaly Petrov coaching fees due to him, citing written statements from National Olympic Committee of Ukraine President Sergey Bubka and Petrov himself. The anonymous source cited by Inquirer mentioned that the matter is supposed to be privileged and strictly confidential in nature but confirmed that PATAFA launched an investigation concerning Obiena.

PATAFA President Philip Juico stated that the investigation was launched following a conversation between Bubka, Petrov and himself in September 2021. Juico said that Petrov revealed to him that he has not been paid since 2018 and that he signed a document related to his salary issue. It has been observed that Petrov does not speak English very well. On Dec 2, 2021 Petrov stated:

I answered and later signed a questionnaire because I was made to understand through their circuitous questioning and reasoning that this would facilitate smoother payments. I was tricked. I answered it that way because I honestly thought it would help unburden EJ of this unnecessary role of managing my payments and that he could fully focus on training.

According to Obiena, PATAFA's written allegation against him shifted from him embezzling funds to paying his coach late. In January 2022, the PATAFA board has recommended filing estafa (swindling) criminal case against Obiena and his mother, Jeannete for alleged misappropriation of funds.

== Positions ==
=== EJ Obiena ===
Obiena in response to PATAFA's accusation against him which was reported by Inquirer stated that the allegations are "rumors" that are "100% false and represent nothing more than character assassination". He mentioned that he has filed a complaint to the Philippine Olympic Committee (POC), the International Olympic Committee (IOC), and World Athletics. He has also appeared in an online press conference along with Petrov himself who backed Obiena's claim that he has been paid in full.

On November 21, Obiena presented documentary evidence that he has paid Petrov on time from May 2018 to August 2021. The pole vaulter has hired the service of PricewaterhouseCoopers to audit his payments though he admitted that some liquidation documents were processed late or in "a sloppy fashion".

While he admitted to occasionally paying his coach late, Obiena also raised that if PATAFA had been paying his coach directly the issue would not arise while he adds that he had request the federation in the past to do so but such proposal has been denied. He said that he would rather focus on training than doing additional accounting and other administration work.

=== Vitaly Petrov ===
Vitaly Petrov denies making a grievance to PATAFA over his coaching fees he owed from Obiena. In December 2021, he maintained that Obiena has paid him adding that he was paid slightly more than the €85,000 PATAFA said Obiena did not remit to him. Petrov though admitted that he has been paid late at times, sometimes in irregular tranches, by Obiena but maintains that the pole vaulter is trustworthy. Petrov attributes the payment to what he believes to be PATAFA's inefficiency and accused the federation of tricking him to be able for it to find fault on Obiena.

Petrov mentioned he and Sergey Bubka being approached personally by PATAFA President Philip Juico. He accused Juico of misleading him by making him take a questionnaire and being pressured to answer in a way Juico wanted. Petrov added he was made to understand that the questionnaire was made in order to facilitate smoother payments.

On January 26, 2022, he issued another statement claiming that PATAFA under Juico "never done anything to help develop Obiena". He expressed the federation's move to kick out Obiena from the national team "for nothing" despite having become one of the top five pole vaulters in the world.

=== PATAFA ===
PATAFA confirmed that its investigation over Obiena is a response to written letters by Sergey Bubka and Vitaly Petrov. The federation also countered claims by Obiena that he has paid Petrov on time, insisting he has only settled his dues in November 2021 and not during the months which he officially reported in his liquidation report. It also noted discrepancies on transactions involving banks based in Dubai, Germany, and Manila.

PATAFA President Philip Juico denied accusations that he had pressured Petrov saying that the coach answered freely and volunteered information to him over the salary matter. He insinuated that Petrov is seeking to recant his statement since Petrov is with Obiena in Italy and the coach could end up losing more money.

On January 4, 2022, PATAFA's board recommended expelling Obiena from the national team pool and filing estafa (swindling) case against the athlete. It also recommended filing a case against Petrov before the World Athletics for violation of the Integrity Code of Conduct and declared Obiena's adviser Jim Lafferty as persona non grata.

PATAFA on January 28, 2022, released a statement saying it considers its dispute with Obiena as "case closed" after it submitted its findings of its investigation to the Philippine Sports Commission, and the Commission on Audit for review though it does not rule out pursuing legal actions.

== Response ==
=== Congress probe ===
Philippine Senators quickly came to Obiena's defense, calling unproven accusations "harassment" against an athlete considered a national treasure and passing a motion to recall the budget of the PSC. The Senators later approved the PSC budget with the condition that PATAFA will “rectify the grave injustice” done to Obiena's reputation. During congressional hearings, witnesses testified that PATAFA's payment system is broken.

A probe regarding the matter at the House of Representatives has also been called for.

=== Philippine Sports Commission mediation ===
The Philippine government's sports agency, the Philippine Sports Commission (PSC) first offered to facilitate a mediation between Obiena's camp and PATAFA in November 2021. Obiena verbally stated that he is opened to the mediation but claims that PATAFA ignored PSC's move. In December 2021, Obiena reiterated his willingness for a PSC-led mediation but said he would prefer the Philippine Olympic Committee to finish its own investigation on his affair with PATAFA. The PSC would honor Obiena's stance and temporarily withdrew its mediation efforts.

PSC mediation efforts would continue in January 2022, with both camps reportedly willing to enter to. Efforts for mediation collapsed after Obiena withdrew from participating in the potential PSC-led mediation accusing PATAFA of acting on bad faith believing that the federation still intends to pursue the filing of a criminal cases of estafa against him which he said is baseless. He also expressed reluctance to enter to a confidential mediation since he took a stance that he has "nothing to hide" and acknowledged PSC commissioner Butch Ramirez as a peacemaker for initiating mediation.

Following the development, Ramirez pleads the two parties to resolve their issues even through just informal talks while he maintained that mediation is the best option. He asked Obiena to be "humble" and not "listen to people around him" also pleading to the athlete lawyers and for Juico to "act like a father" to the athlete.

=== Philippine Olympic Committee ===
On December 28, the Philippine Olympic Committee declared PATAFA President Philip Juico as persona non grata in light with his federation's dispute with Obiena. This is due to Juico "for not adhering to POC's aim of uplifting the level of performance of Filipino athletes in international competition and for committing acts not necessary for the proper accomplishment of the purposes of the POC." The move did not equate to the suspension of PATAFA or the removal of Juico as president. It meant that the POC would not recognize Juico as president until a new election be held by PATAFA. Senator Manny Pacquiao lauded the decision and urged Juico to resign.

Juico contests the decision insisting that his affair with Obiena is an intra-national sports association (NSA) issue which he pointed out that according to POC's own constitution should be solved within the NSA first before the POC could intervene. While he added that the POC may have believed that Obiena's issue is not an intra-NSA issue since Obiena launched a complaint to the POC regarding Juico's alleged harassment of the athlete, he maintains that the issue is between the management and board of PATAFA and Obiena; not merely between Obiena and himself or Obiena and the PATAFA organization itself.

The POC ratified its decision to tag Juico as persona non grata through a majority vote by its executive board during its general assembly on January 26, 2022, which was attended by Juico himself who reiterated his stance of the POC's jurisdiction over the matter. POC President Abraham Tolentino maintained that the Olympic body is just following procedure and expressed openness for the persona non grata tag to be lifted if the Obiena and PATAFA dispute gets resolved and Obiena drops the cases he filed against PATAFA. While lamenting over the decision, Juico vowed that this would not distract him from upholding accountability over his federation's athletes. He also accused the POC for railroading the declaration without due process.

=== Other reactions ===
Reacting to Obiena's dispute with the PATAFA, the Philippine government through acting presidential spokesperson Karlo Nograles expressed continued support for support all of our athletes including Obiena and wished for the resolution of the dispute.

Rappler and InterAksyon reports that sentiment in social media were generally supportive of Obiena. Obiena also has public support from other athletes such as boxer Eumir Marcial and politicians such as Senators Manny Pacquiao and Tito Sotto and Kabataan representative Sarah Elago. Within PATAFA, Juico's administration has backing from officials, coaches and athletes who came up with a signed and written manifesto expressing their support.

== Impact to Obiena's career ==
=== Resignation and nationality change ===
Obiena is among the top pole vaulters, placing third in the World Athletics' men's pole vault ranking by the end of 2021. He also initially threatened to resign when the issue between him and PATAFA arose in late 2021.

The PATAFA's board recommended the expulsion of Obiena from the national team pool on January 4, 2022. This move however was deferred for at least two weeks. According to PATAFA chairman Rufus Rodriguez, the deferment was in accordance to the presidential spokesperson statement issued prior.

Despite the dispute with PATAFA, Obiena maintained that he would not change sporting nationality and preferred to continue competing for the Philippines. Obiena's spokesperson and coach James Michael Lafferty said that Obiena has been receiving offers from multiple nations to naturalize him.

=== Endorsement for international competitions ===
On January 25, the Philippine Olympic Committee assured Obiena he could still compete at the upcoming Southeast Asian Games in Vietnam and the Asian Games in China even without the endorsement of PATAFA. According to POC President Abraham Tolentino, the Olympic Charter Rule 27 states that the National Olympic Committees (NOCs), like the POC itself, has the sole authority in naming members of a country's delegation to all competitions sanctioned by the International Olympic Committee (IOC). Tolentino describes the POC's bid for the inclusion of Obiena in these games despite the non-endorsement of PATAFA would be a "test case". In the case that Obiena's inclusion, Tolentino pointed out that Obiena's campaign could be funded privately rather through government funds. However, according to Samahang Weightlifting ng Pilipinas president Monico Puentevella that the by-laws governing NOCs "clearly states" that only NSAs or international federations can accredit athletes for international competitions pointing out similar attempts by the POC in the past to field basketball and cycling athletes without approval from their respective federations.

On January 28, 2021, PATAFA issued a statement equating Obiena's decision to have "chosen to remove himself from the jurisdiction of Patafa" and "to align, work with and avail himself of total support purportedly guaranteed by his patrons, agents, and political backers". It insists that it has decided to focus on developing the remaining members of the national team pool.

On February 7, 2022, the Philippine Senate held hearings on the Obiena PATAFA dispute. Senator Pia Cayetano led the hearings and stated her goal is to craft legislation which will lift the administrative burden from athletes and let them focus on competition. Both Obiena and Juico testified with detailed presentations giving their side of the dispute.

There was a concern that the move might be construed as government interference since after PATAFA Juico was cited for contempt in a Senate hearing potentially endangering the Philippines' participation in international tournaments.

PATAFA did not endorse Obiena's participation in the 2021 Southeast Asian Games, the 2022 World Athletics Indoor Championships, and the 2022 Asian Games. According to PATAFA, it did not act on Obiena's letter dated February 24, 2022 seeking formal endorsements to participate in these tournaments citing that "deferral of any action on EJ Obiena's letter is consistent with the directive of the Senate Committee to undergo mediation, which PATAFA is currently participating in". The POC also suspended PATAFA in response on March 18, 2022. This meant that PATAFA would not be accredited by POC to represent the country in international competitions. PATAFA says that the move deprive it of due process. However this move was later deferred.

Nevertheless, the POC has included Obiena in the entry by names list of the Philippine delegation for the 2021 Southeast Asian Games and has relayed Obiena's situation to World Athletics. A precedent was Lydia de Vega's participation in the 1985 ASEAN Cup despite a dispute with suspended PATAFA president Michael Keon.

=== ISTAF Berlin ===
Obiena competed at the men's pole vault competition in the 2022 ISTAF Berlin, marking his return to international competition since the dispute arose. He finished with a record of 5.70 meters.

== Resolution ==
On March 30, 2022, the Philippine Sports Commission announced that both parties has reached an agreement during the mediation process. The PSC relayed that Obiena has apologized to PATAFA, Juico and his teammates and it was agreed upon that the pole vaulter's participation in international tournaments including the 2021 Southeast Asian Games and the 2022 World Athletics Championship will be endorsed by PATAFA.

On March 31, 2022, Obiena received clearance from the Commission on Audit (COA) finding no wrongdoing and thus officially settling the liquidation issue. In its letter COA, stated: "based on our regular audit of your liquidation, the related expenditures for the following financial assistance granted for your training... were in order". The COA notice officially refuted PATAFA's allegations that Obiena committed estafa.
