= Philippines at the 2025 World Athletics Championships =

- Flag of Philippines
- WA code: PHI
- National federation: Philippine Athletics Track and Field Association

in Tokyo, Japan 13 September 2025 – 21 September 2025
- Competitors: 2 (1 man and 1 woman) in 2 events
- Medals: Gold 0 Silver 0 Bronze 0 Total 0

World Athletics Championships appearances (overview)
- 1983; 1987; 1991; 1993; 1995; 1997; 1999; 2001; 2003; 2005; 2007; 2009; 2011; 2013; 2015; 2017; 2019; 2022; 2023; 2025

The Philippines competed at the 2025 World Athletics Championships in Tokyo, Japan, from 13 to 21 September 2025.

== Results ==
Philippines entered 2 athletes to the championships: 1 man and 1 woman.

Key

- Q = Qualified for the next round
- q = Qualified for the next round as a fastest loser or, in field events, by position without achieving the qualifying target
- NR = National record
- PB = Personal best
- SB = Season best
- N/A = Round not applicable for the event

=== Men ===
Field events

EJ Obiena took part in the men's pole vault. This was his third straight appearance having won a bronze in the 2022 edition in Eugene, Oregon, and a silver in the 2023 edition in Budapest. He was coming off from the 2025 World Athletics Continental Tour tournament in Beijing where he cleared 5.65 meters earning a broze although Obiena assessed the performance as "ugly".

Obiena cleared 5.55 meters finishing 11th among vaulters in Group A. He ranked 18th place overall for the qualification phase. Only the top twelve athletes advanced to the finals.

Athlete	Event	Qualification		Final	
Athlete	Event	Distance	Position	Distance	Position
EJ Obiena	Pole vault	5.55	18	Did not advance	

=== Women ===
Track and road events

Robyn Brown was the second athlete competing for the Philippines, after Obiena. This is her second consecutive appearance after her debut in 2023.

She competed in the 400 metres hurdles. She was grouped with Heat 1, and is the lowest ranked among the nine athletes at 63rd. Brown finished last, recording a time of 57.03 seconds. Requiring to finish among the top four in her heat, Brown failed to advance to the semifinals. Overall, she finished 40th only besting Yanique Haye-Smith of the Turks and Caicos Islands.

Athlete	Event	Heat		Semifinal		Final	
Athlete	Event	Result	Rank	Result	Rank	Result	Rank
Robyn Brown	400 metres hurdles	57.03	9	Did not advance			
