= Philippine Athletics Championships =

- Current season, competition or edition: 2024 Philippine Athletics Championships
- Sport: Track and field
- Country: Philippines

The Philippine Athletics Championships, previously known as the Philippine National Open, is an annual outdoor track and field competition which serves as the national championship for the Philippines, organized by the Philippine Athletics Track and Field Association.

== History ==
In the 2023 edition, qualifying points for the World Championships were offered for the first time in the national championships' history.

== Editions ==
List of championships
Year	Location	Stadium	Date	Ref
2002	Manila	Rizal Memorial Stadium	May 1–3, 2002	
2005				
2007	Not held			
2008	Manila	Rizal Memorial Stadium	August	
2009	Lingayen, Pangasinan	Narciso Ramos Sports Complex	May 11–14, 2009	
2010	Manila	Rizal Memorial Stadium	May 21–23, 2010	
2011–2014	Not held			
2015	Santa Cruz, Laguna	Laguna Sports Complex	March 19–21, 2015	
2016	Pasig, Metro Manila	PhilSports Stadium	April 7–9, 2016	
2017	Ilagan, Isabela	Ilagan Sports Complex	March 29–April 2, 2017	
2018	Ilagan, Isabela	Ilagan Sports Complex	May 31–June 4, 2018	
2019	Ilagan, Isabela	Ilagan Sports Complex	March 6–8, 2019	
2020	Capas, Tarlac	New Clark City Athletics Stadium	March 19–21, 2021 (Note: Was originally set to be held at the PhilSports Stadium in Pasig in December 4-6 2020, but was postponed due to the COVID-19 pandemic.)	
2021	Baguio	Baguio Athletic Bowl	December 17–18, 2021	
2022	Pasig, Metro Manila	PhilSports Stadium	April 28–29, 2022	
2023	Ilagan, Isabela	Ilagan Sports Complex	March 21–26, 2023	
2024	Pasig, Metro Manila	PhilSports Stadium	May 8–12, 2024	
2025	Capas, Tarlac	New Clark City Athletics Stadium	May 1–4, 2025	
2026	Capas, Tarlac	New Clark City Athletics Stadium	June 10–14, 2026	

== See also ==
- List of Filipino records in athletics
