= Philippines at the 2023 World Athletics Championships =

- WA code: PHI
- National federation: Philippine Athletics Track and Field Association

in Budapest, Hungary 19–27 August 2023
- Competitors: 3 (2 men and 1 woman) in 3 events
- Medals Ranked 27th: Gold 0 Silver 1 Bronze 0 Total 1

World Athletics Championships appearances (overview)
- 1983; 1987; 1991; 1993; 1995; 1997; 1999; 2001; 2003; 2005; 2007; 2009; 2011; 2013; 2015; 2017; 2019; 2022; 2023; 2025

The Philippines competed at the 2023 World Athletics Championships in Budapest, Hungary, from 19 to 27 August 2023. The Philippines won their first ever silver medal in the championship, courtesy of pole vaulter EJ Obiena.

== Medalists ==
Medal	Athlete	Event	Date
Silver	EJ Obiena	Men's pole vault	August 26

== Results ==
Key

- Q = Qualified for the next round
- q = Qualified for the next round as a fastest loser or, in field events, by position without achieving the qualifying target
- NR = National record
- PB = Personal best
- SB = Season best
- NM = No mark
- N/A = Round not applicable for the event

=== Men ===
==== Track and road events ====
Eric Cray finished seventh among nine competitors in heat 2 of the men's 400 metres hurdles event and failed to advance.

Athlete	Event	Heat		Semifinal		Final	
Athlete	Event	Result	Rank	Result	Rank	Result	Rank
Eric Cray	400 metres hurdles	50.27	7	Did not advance			

==== Field events ====
EJ Obiena outbested his bronze medal finish in the 2022 edition. In the second try in the final round, Obiena leaped 6 meters, duplicating his own personal record which is also the current Asian record. He attempted to clear 6.05 meters was unable to do so finishing second to gold medalist Armand Duplantis of Sweden. Obiena's silver medal was the first-ever for the Philippines in the world championships.

Athlete	Event	Qualification		Final	
Athlete	Event	Distance	Position	Distance	Position
EJ Obiena	Pole vault	5.75	=1 q	6.00 =AR	2nd place, silver medalist(s)

=== Women ===
==== Track and road events ====
Robyn Brown qualified for women's 400 metres hurdles event through her gold medal finish in the 2023 Asian Athletics Championships. Brown was unable to advance to the next round, finishing 56.83 seconds in the heats.

Athlete	Event	Heat		Semifinal		Final	
Athlete	Event	Result	Rank	Result	Rank	Result	Rank
Robyn Brown	400 metres hurdles	56.83	7	Did not advance			
