= 2023 PATAFA Weekly Relay Series – Men's 5 kilometres walk =

Men's 5 kilometres walk at the 2023 PATAFA Weekly Relay Series
- Venue: PhilSports Football and Athletics Stadium
- Dates: 23 July – 1 October (qualifiers); 28 October (final)
- Competitors: 23
- Teams: 13
- Winning time: 23:53.33

Medalists
gold medal	Vincent Vianmar Dela Cruz	Philippines
silver medal	Peter Lachica	Philippines
bronze medal	Carlos De Imus	Philippines

The men's 5000m walk at the 2023 PATAFA Weekly Relay Series was held at the PhilSports Football and Athletics Stadium in Pasig from 23 July to 28 October 2023, and was sanctioned by the Philippine Athletics Track and Field Association.

== Summary ==
In preparation for the UAAP Season 86 Athletics Championships hosted by the Ateneo de Manila University in November, each participating school sent their athletes to participate in the annual PATAFA Weekly Relay Series to serve as their preseason tournament. In addition to the participating UAAP athletes, race walkers from both NCAA and independent teams participated in the lone men's race walking event in the tournament. Although the latter league has its own track and field championships held the next year, it does not include any race walking events.

Reigning UAAP champion and record holder Carlos De Imus (23:05.29) of the University of Santo Tomas featured in the qualifiers and advanced to the finals, finishing at bronze, now competing under the Far Eastern University.

Meanwhile, eventual Season 86 champion and new record holder Vincent Vianmar Dela Cruz of the University of the East finished first in both the qualifiers and finals, bagging the gold medal.

== Qualifiers ==
=== Cummulative Results ===
Rank	Name	School	Time	Notes
1	Vincent Vianmar Dela Cruz	UE	24:01.70	Q
2	Carlos De Imus	FEU	25:05.23	Q
3	Jeric Pasquin	UE	25:16.22	Q
4	Peter Lachica	UP	25:17.69	Q
5	John Aaron Arandia	NU	25:19.38	Q
6	Mark Anthony Estoya	FEU	25:23.02	Q
7	John Yuri Jumaday	Adamson	25:33.96	Q
8	Gabriel Amit Oxales	UST	25:39.81	Q
9	Francis James San Gabriel	UP	26:38.78	Q
10	Ralph Justine Orfano	UE	26:52.28	Q
11	Justine Macuring	FEU	27:04.88	Q
12	Martin Angelo Leehuekee	UST	27:07.24	Q
13	Kent Gerald Tolentino	UP	27:08.25	
14	Cris Gabayan	FEU	28:06.26	
15	Kang Dal Calub	La Salle	28:24.88	
16	Hurjay Yumul	N/A	28:27.94	
17	Jufex Letsoncito	Adamson	28:43.40	
18	Franz Patrick Bourbon	Arellano	29:37.65	
19	Renato Panes Jr.	NU	30:22.44	
20	Edgar De Guzman	Perpetual	31:36.61	
21	Luis Antonio Licas	Ateneo	34:32.51	
22	Christian Ayuco	N/A	34:33.38	
23	Jeric Espedido	N/A	DNF	

=== Best time by school ===
==== UAAP ====
Rank	Name	School	Time	Notes
1	Vincent Vianmar Dela Cruz	UE	24:01.70	Q
2	Carlos De Imus	FEU	25:05.23	Q
4	Peter Lachica	UP	25:17.69	Q
5	John Aaron Arandia	NU	25:19.38	Q
7	John Yuri Jumaday	Adamson	25:33.96	Q
8	Gabriel Amit Oxales	UST	25:39.81	Q
15	Kang Dal Calub	La Salle	28:24.88	
21	Luis Antonio Licas	Ateneo	34:32.51	

==== NCAA ====
Rank	Name	School	Time	Notes
18	Franz Patrick Bourbon	Arellano	29:37.65	
20	Edgar De Guzman	Perpetual	31:36.61	

=== First Qualifiers ===
The race started on 23 July at 09:40.

Rank	Name	School	Time	Notes
1st place, gold medalist(s)	Vincent Vianmar Dela Cruz	UE	24:01.70	Q
2nd place, silver medalist(s)	Gabriel Amit Oxales	UST	25:51.55	
3rd place, bronze medalist(s)	Jeric Pasquin	UE	26:48.16	
4	Ralph Justine Orfano	UE	26:52.28	Q
5	Martin Angelo Leehuekee	UST	27:07.24	Q
6	Cris Gabayan	FEU	28:06.34	
7	Hurjay Yumul	N/A	28:27.94	
8	Renato Panes Jr.	NU	30:22.44	
9	Christian Ayuco	N/A	34:33.38	
10	Luis Antonio Licas	Ateneo	38:23.55	
	John Yuri Jumaday	Adamson	DNF	

=== Second Results ===
The race started on 27 August at 09:40.

Rank	Name	School	Time	Notes
1st place, gold medalist(s)	Carlos De Imus	FEU	25:05.23	Q
2nd place, silver medalist(s)	John Yuri Jumaday	Adamson	25:33.96	Q
3rd place, bronze medalist(s)	Gabriel Amit Oxales	UST	25:39.81	Q
4	Justine Macuring	FEU	27:04.88	Q
5	Cris Gabayan	FEU	28:06.26	
6	Kang Dal Calub	La Salle	28:42.59	
7	Jufex Letsoncito	Adamson	30:30.86	
8	Edgar De Guzman	Perpetual	31:36.61	
	Luis Antonio Licas	Ateneo	DQ	
	Ralph Justine Orfano	UE	DQ	
	Jeric Pasquin	UE	DNF	

=== Third Qualifiers ===
The race started on 1 October at 09:40.

Rank	Name	School	Time	Notes
1st place, gold medalist(s)	Vincent Vianmar Dela Cruz	UE	24:47.83	
2nd place, silver medalist(s)	Jeric Pasquin	UE	25:16.22	Q
3rd place, bronze medalist(s)	Peter Lachica	UP	25:17.69	Q
4	John Aaron Arandia	NU	25:19.38	Q
5	Mark Anthony Estoya	FEU	25:23.02	Q
6	Gabriel Amit Oxales	UST	25:52.97	
7	Francis James San Gabriel	UP	26:38.78	Q
8	Kent Gerald Tolentino	UP	27:08.25	
9	Justine Macuring	FEU	27:24.52	
10	Kang Dal Calub	La Salle	28:24.88	SB
11	Ralph Justine Orfano	UE	28:25.44	
12	Jufex Letsoncito	Adamson	28:43.40	SB
13	Franz Patrick Bourbon	Arellano	29:37.65	
14	Hurjay Yumul	N/A	30:47.61	
15	Edmar De Guzman	Perpetual	31:37.62	PB
16	Luis Antonio Licas	Ateneo	34:32.51	PB
	John Yuri Jumaday	Adamson	DNF	
	Renato Panes Jr.	NU	DNF	
	Jeric Espedido	N/A	DNF	

== Finals ==
The race started on 28 October at 09:40.

Rank	Name	School	Time	Notes
1st place, gold medalist(s)	Vincent Vianmar Dela Cruz	UE	23:53.33	
2nd place, silver medalist(s)	Peter Lachica	UP	24:31.74	
3rd place, bronze medalist(s)	Carlos De Imus	FEU	24:48.13	
4	Mark Anthony Estoya	FEU	25:40.87	
5	Ralph Justine Orfano	UE	26:00.33	
	John Yuri Jumaday	Adamson	DNF	
	Jeric Pasquin	UE	DNF	
	Francis James San Gabriel	UP	DNF	
	John Aaron Arandia	NU	DNS	
	Martin Angelo Leehuekee	UST	DNS	
	Justine Macuring	FEU	DNS	
	Gabriel Amit Oxales	UST	DNS	

== Final standings ==
Rank	Name	School
1st place, gold medalist(s)	Vincent Vianmar Dela Cruz	UE
2nd place, silver medalist(s)	Peter Lachica	UP
3rd place, bronze medalist(s)	Carlos De Imus	FEU
4	Mark Anthony Estoya	FEU
5	Ralph Justine Orfano	UE
6	Jeric Pasquin	UE
7	John Yuri Jumaday	Adamson
8	Francis James San Gabriel	UP
9	John Aaron Arandia	NU
10	Gabriel Amit Oxales	UST
11	Justine Macuring	FEU
12	Martin Angelo Leehuekee	UST
13	Kent Gerald Tolentino	UP
14	Cris Gabayan	FEU
15	Kang Dal Calub	La Salle
16	Hurjay Yumul	N/A
17	Jufex Letsoncito	Adamson
18	Franz Patrick Bourbon	Arellano
19	Renato Panes Jr.	NU
20	Edgar De Guzman	Perpetual
21	Luis Antonio Licas	Ateneo
22	Christian Ayuco	N/A
23	Jeric Espedido	N/A
