= Philippines at the 2019 World Athletics Championships =

- WA code: PHI
- National federation: Philippine Athletics Track and Field Association

in Doha 27 September 2019 – 6 October 2019
- Competitors: 1 (1 man) in 1 event
- Medals: Gold 0 Silver 0 Bronze 0 Total 0

World Athletics Championships appearances (overview)
- 1983; 1987; 1991; 1993; 1995; 1997; 1999; 2001; 2003; 2005; 2007; 2009; 2011; 2013; 2015; 2017; 2019; 2022; 2023; 2025

The Philippines competed at the 2019 World Athletics Championships in Doha, Qatar, from 27 September to 6 October 2019. The Philippines was represented by a lone athlete; pole vaulter Ernest Obiena.

== Results ==
(q – qualified, NM – no mark, SB – season best)

=== Men ===
Field events

Athlete	Event	Qualification		Final	
Athlete	Event	Distance	Position	Distance	Position
Ernest Obiena	Pole vault	5.60	=15	Did not advance	
