= Philippines at the 2011 World Championships in Athletics =

- WA code: PHI
- National federation: Philippine Amateur Track and Field Association
- Website: www.patafa.multiply.com

in Daegu 27 August 2017 – 4 September 2017
- Competitors: 2 (1 man and 1 woman) in 1 event
- Medals: Gold 0 Silver 0 Bronze 0 Total 0

World Championships in Athletics appearances
- 1983; 1987; 1991; 1993; 1995; 1997; 1999; 2001; 2003; 2005; 2007; 2009; 2011; 2013; 2015; 2017; 2019; 2022; 2023; 2025

The Philippines competed at the 2011 World Championships in Athletics from August 27 to September 4 in Daegu, South Korea. A team of 2 athletes was announced to represent the country in the event.

== Results ==
=== Men ===
Athlete	Event	Preliminaries		Heats		Semifinals		Final	
Athlete	Event	Time Width Height	Rank	Time Width Height	Rank	Time Width Height	Rank	Time Width Height	Rank
Henry Dagmil	Long jump	NM	N/A	Did not advance					

=== Women ===
Athlete	Event	Preliminaries		Heats		Semifinals		Final	
Athlete	Event	Time Width Height	Rank	Time Width Height	Rank	Time Width Height	Rank	Time Width Height	Rank
Marestella Torres	Long jump	6.31	21	Did not advance					
