= PhilSports Stadium stampede =

2006 crowd crush in Philippines

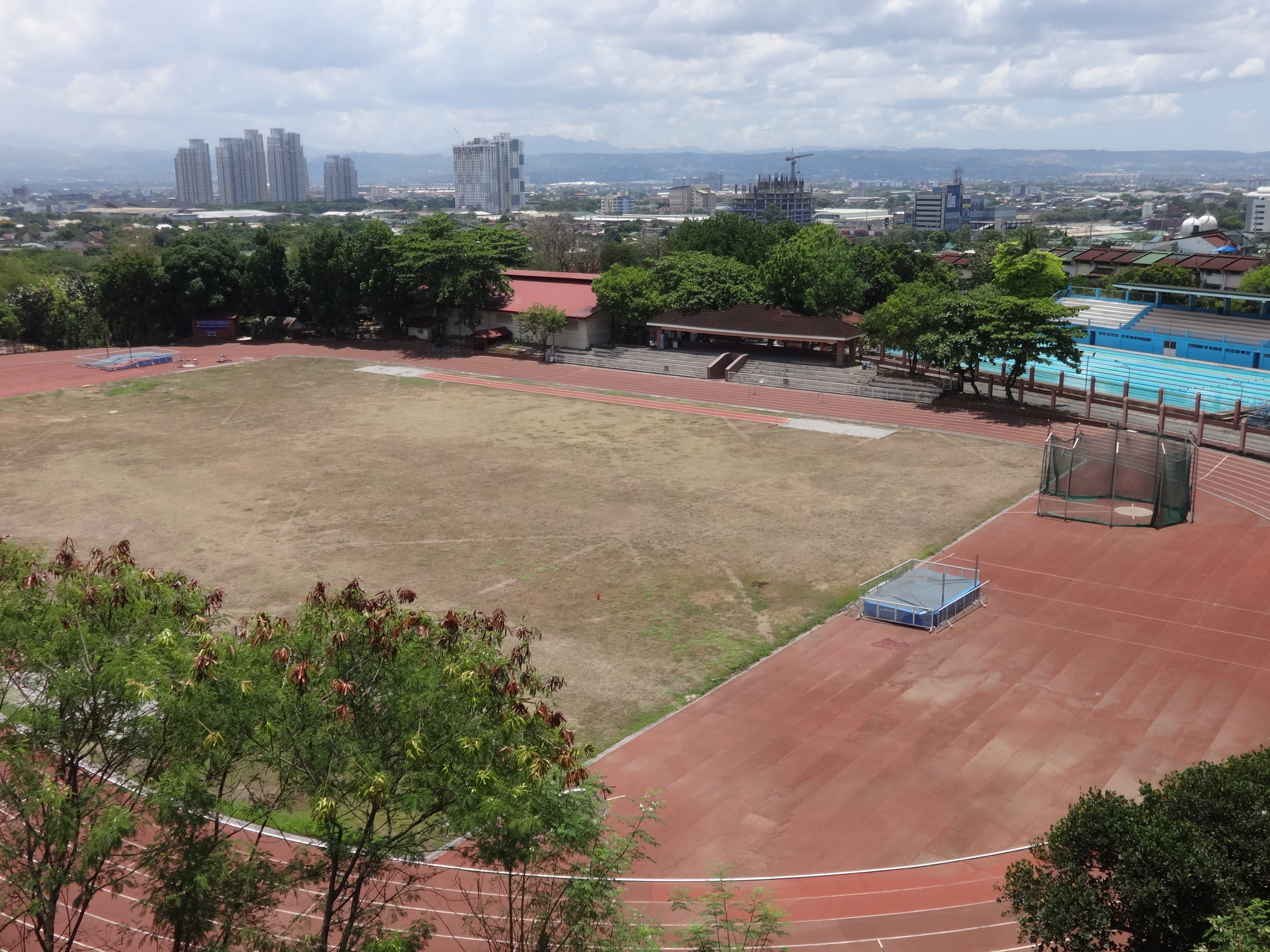
- PhilSports Stadium (pictured in 2018) where the stampede occurred.
- Date: February 4, 2006; 20 years ago
- Time: 6:00 A.M. (PST)
- Location: PhilSports Football and Athletics Stadium, Pasig, Metro Manila, Philippines; 14°34′39″N 121°03′58″E
- Also known as: ULTRA stampede Wowowee stampede
- Type: Crowd crush
- Deaths: 73
- Injuries: 400

On February 4, 2006, a crowd crush (Note: Several news outlets described the event as a "stampede". This article uses "crowd crush" and "crush" for consistency.) occurred at the PhilSports Stadium in Pasig, Metro Manila, in the Philippines. The crush occurred hours before the first anniversary event of the noontime variety show Wowowee, where 30,000 people had been waiting outside to participate. It killed 73 people and wounded 400 others. The victims include mainly elderly and middle-aged women.

== Background ==
On February 4, 2006, about 30,000 people had gathered outside the PhilSports Stadium to participate in the first anniversary episode of ABS-CBN early afternoon television game show, Wowowee scheduled at 1 pm. The football stadium was supposed to be the viewing area of people who were not able to enter the basketball arena, where the program was to be staged. The size of the crowd was significantly larger than the usual 5,000 who attended previous recordings which were held at ABS-CBN studios.

It was the show's first anniversary event, and there were prizes awaiting to be offered including jeepneys, taxis and a top prize of one million pesos. According to a Philippine Daily Inquirer report, most of the victims were from the poorest parts of Metro Manila and nearby provinces, generally jobless and attracted by the show's promise of instant wealth.

== Crowd crush ==
At about 6:00 am., organizers of the show began handing out tickets to people in the crowd, many of whom had been camping outside the stadium for days to acquire them. Overhearing the news, people started trying to get ahead of the queue and became agitated. As people in front of the line were given entrance to the stadium, the crowds became more impatient and started pushing forward and shoving, prompting security guards to panic and shut the entrance gates. Witnesses and several survivors reported that the crush began when the already impatient crowd continued pushing and shoving, causing one of the barriers used to keep people in queue to collapse.

Coincidentally, the gates happened to be on a sloped driveway and when security guards tried to seal the gates further and calm the crowd, the latter continued pushing and shoving as well as shaking the gates until they were forced open. After the gates eventually gave way, people at the front collapsed from exhaustion while others behind them stumbled. The sloped driveway contributed to the worsening of the crush.

As a result of the incident, the network ended the show's first iteration and indefinitely postponed the anniversary presentation.

== Casualties ==
The crush killed 73 people and injured around 800 people. It was earlier thought that 88 people had died, but this was due to double counting by the rescue workers. The majority of the victims were young middle-aged women, but also included elderly people.

Senator and Philippine National Red Cross Chairman Dick Gordon said that most of the injured were not in serious condition and many have been treated and released. The Red Cross, ABS-CBN's affiliated NGOs, and the network itself led efforts in recovering the dead bodies, providing medical care for the injured, and other related assistance. The victims were also fully assisted by government authorities.

ABS-CBN chairman and CEO Eugenio "Gabby" Lopez III promised to provide aid and financial assistance to the victims and their families. The network also formed 71 Dreams Foundation to assist the relatives of the victims.

== Investigation and aftermath ==
=== Bomb threats and false alarms ===
Some survivors and officials stated in reports that the crush was caused and worsened by bomb jokes and other false alarms shouted by one or more crowd members. A report by BBC and ABC News also theorized the legitimacy of the alleged bomb scares but police and other authorities denied the statements due to insufficient evidence.

=== Task Force Ultra ===
Task Force Ultra, an inter-agency investigating body consisting of the National Capital Region Police Office, Department of Interior and Local Government (DILG) and the Department of Justice, was created to investigate the cause of the crush. According to its findings, Wowowee offered only very few tickets to a very large crowd, which had been waiting for days to gain entry to the stadium.

In its statement, the surge was triggered by an ABS-CBN staff member announcing to the crowd gathered at the gate that only the first 300 people in line beneath the covered walkway leading to the stadium would be chosen to participate in the Pera o Bayong portion of the show. This portion, which offered from ₱10,000 to ₱50,000 in prizes (US$193 to $969 at a rate of $1=₱51.70), "excited" the crowd and "incited the people who were outside the official queue to push their way into the already jampacked queue, hoping that they could squeeze in among the first 300." To control the deluge of people wanting to get in, the network's staff closed the gate, but the rush of people, coupled with the steep incline and uneven surface of the road caused those in front of the mob to stumble and fall, culminating in the crush that caused the majority of the deaths and injuries.

It was also reported an "obvious lack of coordination" between the organizers and relevant government agencies. It said that while ABS-CBN had sought the assistance of Pasig's mayor and police chief, "neither was invited to any of the organizers' production meetings."

The National Telecommunications Commission, a government agency that supervises all radio and television broadcasting stations and other telecommunications services, said ABS-CBN could lose its license and franchise to operate if it was proven that the network was "delinquent" in providing enough measures to protect those who went to the venue. The commission said it would compose an inquiry as to whether ABS-CBN violated a 1985 circular that requires TV networks "not to commit any act that would be detrimental to public health, public welfare or public safety."

In October 2006, relatives of the victims announced that a class suit would be filed against ABS-CBN and its CEO. “There is now probable cause (for the case),” said Dante Jimenez, the chairman of the Volunteers Against Crime and Corruption (VACC).

On January 29, 2008, the Supreme Court ruled with finality dismissing ABS-CBN's case of junking the investigation by the Department of Justice. This meant that the DOJ could now indict all those involved in the crush except for Willie Revillame, the show's host.

== Reaction ==
Pope Benedict XVI expressed sadness over the incident. Vatican Secretary of State Cardinal Angelo Sodano said in a telegram to Pasig Bishop Francisco San Diego that 'the Pope offers his prayers and condolences for all those affected by this terrible accident.'

On the first anniversary of the disaster, Wowowee offered the last segment of the show to a candlelight vigil lent and moment of silence in the studio with Revillame giving a short statement and the show ending with Yeng Constantino singing "Hawak Kamay". Simultaneously, the hosts, producers, and the director of Eat Bulaga!, Wowowee's rival variety show on GMA Network, offered a minute of silence and prayers for the victims of the crush, which they also did in 2006 in the wake of the incident. A contestant on the show's former segment, "On The Spot Jackpot", had a relative who died during the incident and shared his/her experiences about what happened before quoting that "life is more important than money". ABS-CBN later thanked their rival network for their prayers and sympathies.

Guinness World Records cited this incident as "the greatest death toll in a game show".

== In popular culture ==
The incident was dramatized and investigated in the GMA Network-produced docudrama series, Case Unclosed.

== See also ==
- Crowd "stampedes"
- Kanjuruhan Stadium disaster
- Seoul Halloween crowd crush
- Victoria Hall disaster, crowd crush caused by the distribution of free prizes to children in a variety show
- List of crowd crushes
