= MyTV (British and Irish TV channel) =

British television channel

Programming
- Language: English

Ownership
- Owner: Grupo Record

History
- Launched: 27 February 2006
- Closed: 1 January 2021
- Former names: Eat Cinema (2006-2007); My Channel (2007-2017)

Links
- Website: mytv.co.uk

MyTV was a British television channel which launched on 27 February 2006 as Eat Cinema, originally targeted at mainstream audiences.

The channel was originally a joint venture between multi-platform digital television company Enteraction TV (ETV) and trade body All Industry Marketing for fashion, cinema and publicity. On 3 January 2007, the channel changed its name from Eat Cinema to My Channel. During the months prior to this date, the channel had reduced its cinema related content. Until 27 November 2007, the schedule consisted of three old L!VE TV programmes, Lie Detector, The Why Files and Indecent Proposals. These programmes were repeated daily, with no advertisement breaks and no on-screen channel logo.

On 27 November 2007, the channel was acquired by Record Media Group, all content was changed, and an on-screen channel logo added; as of 2011 the channel is controlled by Record TV Network, a UK-based operator and licensee of over 150 channels worldwide.

MyTV was available on Sky channel 190. My Channel swapped EPG numbers with 'Channel TBC' on 14 June 2010.

MyTV ceased broadcasting in the UK on 1 January 2021, alongside sister channel Record TV HD.

== MyTV Programmes ==
As of August 2019:

- King David
- The Chrissy B Show
- On Screen
- Shift
- My Top 10
- France 24
- Drive It!
- Arts.21
- Tomorrow Today
- Global 3000
- In Good Shape
- Isaura The Slave
- Joseph from Egypt
- Moses and the Ten Commandments
- My First Home
- The Wildlife Docs
- The Aviators
- Next Stop
- Top Million Dollar Agent
- Nomads
- The Secretary
- I Love Her to Death
- Mariana and Scarlett
- Walk Around Britain
- The Fashion Hero
- Miracles of Jesus
- Esther
- Finding Answers
