= Philippines at the 1987 World Championships in Athletics =

- WA code: PHI
- National federation: Philippine Athletics Track and Field Association

in Rome August 28 – September 6, 1987
- Competitors: 2 (1 man and 1 woman) in 2 events
- Medals: Gold 0 Silver 0 Bronze 0 Total 0

World Championships in Athletics appearances
- 1983; 1987; 1991; 1993; 1995; 1997; 1999; 2001; 2003; 2005; 2007; 2009; 2011; 2013; 2015; 2017; 2019; 2022; 2023; 2025

Philippines competed at the 1987 World Championships in Athletics in Rome, Italy, from August 28 to September 6, 1987. The Philippines fielded 2 athletes who competed in 2 events.

== Results ==
=== Men ===
Field events

Athlete	Event	Qualification		Final	
Athlete	Event	Distance	Position	Distance	Position
Romeo Montanes	Javelin Throw	58.38	37	Did not advance	

=== Women ===
Field events

Athlete	Event	Qualification		Final	
Athlete	Event	Distance	Position	Distance	Position
Dorie Cortejo	Discus Throw	40.98	22	Did not advance	
