= Philippines at the 1983 World Championships in Athletics =

- WA code: PHI
- National federation: Philippine Athletics Track and Field Association

in Helsinki, Finland August 7–14, 1983
- Competitors: 2 (1 man and 1 woman) in 3 events
- Medals: Gold 0 Silver 0 Bronze 0 Total 0

World Championships in Athletics appearances
- 1983; 1987; 1991; 1993; 1995; 1997; 1999; 2001; 2003; 2005; 2007; 2009; 2011; 2013; 2015; 2017; 2019; 2022; 2023; 2025

Philippines competed at the 1983 World Championships in Athletics in Helsinki, Finland, from August 7 to 14, 1983. The championships were the first to feature both men and women's events and a full complement of events. The Philippines entered 2 athletes who competed in 3 events.

== Results ==
=== Men ===
Track and road events

Athlete	Event	Heat		Quarterfinal		Semifinal		Final	
Athlete	Event	Result	Rank	Result	Rank	Result	Rank	Result	Rank
Isidro del Prado	400 metres	46.93	23 Q	46.71	22	Did not advance			

=== Women ===
Track and road events

Athlete	Event	Heat		Quarterfinal		Semifinal		Final	
Athlete	Event	Result	Rank	Result	Rank	Result	Rank	Result	Rank
Lydia de Vega	100 metres	11.74	5 q	11.90	8	Did not advance			
Lydia de Vega	200 metres	24.45	4 Q	24.16	7	Did not advance			
