= Different Kind of Woman =

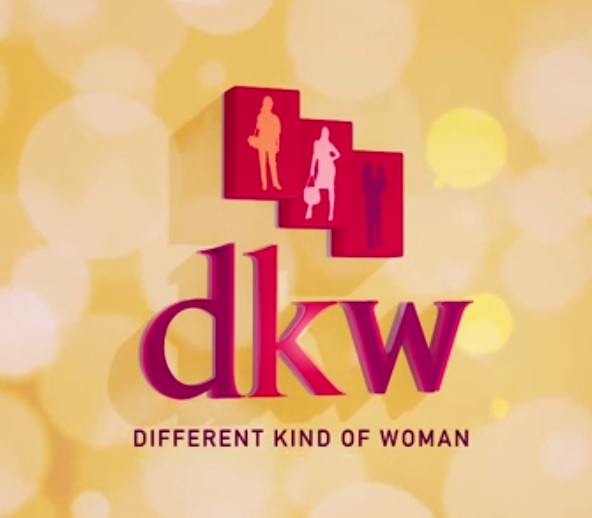
- Genre: Talk show
- Created by: Linzy Attenborough starring =
- Starring: Kim Powell; Samantha Dixon; Verena Matthews; Anna-Maria Georgiades; Diane Passelle; Gemma Passley; Anne Anofienem
- Country of origin: United Kingdom

Production
- Executive producer: Linzy Attenborough
- Production location: Record TV Network Studios (2014-)
- Editor: Farhad Edah-Tally
- Running time: 1 hour (inc. adverts)
- Production company: Record TV Network (2014–)

Original release
- Network: My Channel
- Release: 6 September 2014 – present

Different Kind Of Women know often as 'DKW' is a British talk show that has been broadcast on My Channel since 6 September 2014. The programme focuses on a panel of female presenters, who interview special guests, discuss their lives and topical issues that often effect women today.

The panel comprises women from various professions in the entertainment and journalism industries.

== About the series ==
DKW airs on My Channel, Sunday afternoons from 4-5 PM. The show gives viewers a light-hearted and informative view on a diverse array of subjects and topics that affect women every day. The show aims to inspire women and to empower them to be unique. Many topics and issues are covered in each show. Topics range from love and romance to careers, health, family and self-motivation. The show is often repeated on Thursday Mornings and Saturday afternoons.

== Presenters ==
The show is presented by a set team of women each week. With guest presenters and regulars. Each show would often see a main presenter alongside 3-4 other female co-hosts.

=== International variations ===
- In the UK, Loose Women debuted in 1999.
- In the United States, The View debuted in 1997. The Talk debuted in 2010, and The Real in 2013.
- In Germany, Frauenzimmer aired between 26 October 2009 and 20 November 2009. The show was cancelled due to poor ratings.
- In Australia, The Circle first aired in 2010 and has a similar format. The show, which also features cookery and makeover segments, is a popular daytime show on Network Ten.
- In France, Le Grand 8 has been aired since October 2012 on weekdays from 12.10 to 13.25 on D8 free digital terrestrial channel, part of Canal + group. The host, Laurence Ferrari, former presenter of TF1 8 pm newscast, and four panellists discuss on topics such as politics, health, trends, business and culture.
- In Ireland, Midday first aired in 2008 on TV3. Midday has been described as an Irish Loose Women but a TV3 representative said "We're not going to be like Loose Women though, they seem to do a lot of men bashing and talking about their sex lives, we certainly won't be doing that"
- In Mexico, Netas Divinas first aired in 2012. It is among the few variations of the programme to be aired in other countries, having aired in other Latin American countries as well as on Galavision in the United States.
- In Canada, The Social first aired in 2013 on CTV Television Network.
