= Philippines at the 2013 World Championships in Athletics =

- WA code: PHI
- National federation: Philippine Athletics Track and Field Association

in Moscow 10 August 2013 – 18 August 2013
- Competitors: 1 (1 man) in 1 event
- Medals: Gold 0 Silver 0 Bronze 0 Total 0

World Championships in Athletics appearances
- 1983; 1987; 1991; 1993; 1995; 1997; 1999; 2001; 2003; 2005; 2007; 2009; 2011; 2013; 2015; 2017; 2019; 2022; 2023; 2025

The Philippines competed at the 2013 World Championships in Athletics in Moscow, Russia, from 10–18 August 2013. A team of 2 athletes was initially announced to represent the country in the event. Only one Filipino athlete, Eric Cray participated in the tournament. He participated in the 400 Metres Hurdles.

== Results ==
=== Men ===
Track and road events

Athlete	Event	Heat		Quarterfinal		Semifinal		Final	
Athlete	Event	Result	Rank	Result	Rank	Result	Rank	Result	Rank
Eric Cray	400 metres hurdles	52.45	34	Did not advance					
