= Philippines at the 1991 World Championships in Athletics =

- WA code: PHI
- National federation: Philippine Athletics Track and Field Association

in Tokyo August 23 – September 1, 1991
- Competitors: 1 (1 woman) in 1 event
- Medals: Gold 0 Silver 0 Bronze 0 Total 0

World Championships in Athletics appearances
- 1983; 1987; 1991; 1993; 1995; 1997; 1999; 2001; 2003; 2005; 2007; 2009; 2011; 2013; 2015; 2017; 2019; 2022; 2023; 2025

Philippines competed at the 1991 World Championships in Athletics in Tokyo, Japan, from August 23 to September 1, 1991. The Philippines fielded 2 athletes who competed in 2 events.

== Results ==
=== Men ===
Field events

Athlete	Event	Qualification		Final	
Athlete	Event	Distance	Position	Distance	Position
Benjamin Cawicaan	Javelin Throw	61.38	41	Did not advance	

=== Women ===
Track and road events

Athlete	Event	Heat		Quarterfinal		Semifinal		Final	
Athlete	Event	Result	Rank	Result	Rank	Result	Rank	Result	Rank
Elma Muros	400 metres hurdles	59.90	7	Did not advance					
