= Rizal Memorial Stadium =

Track and football stadium in Manila, Philippines

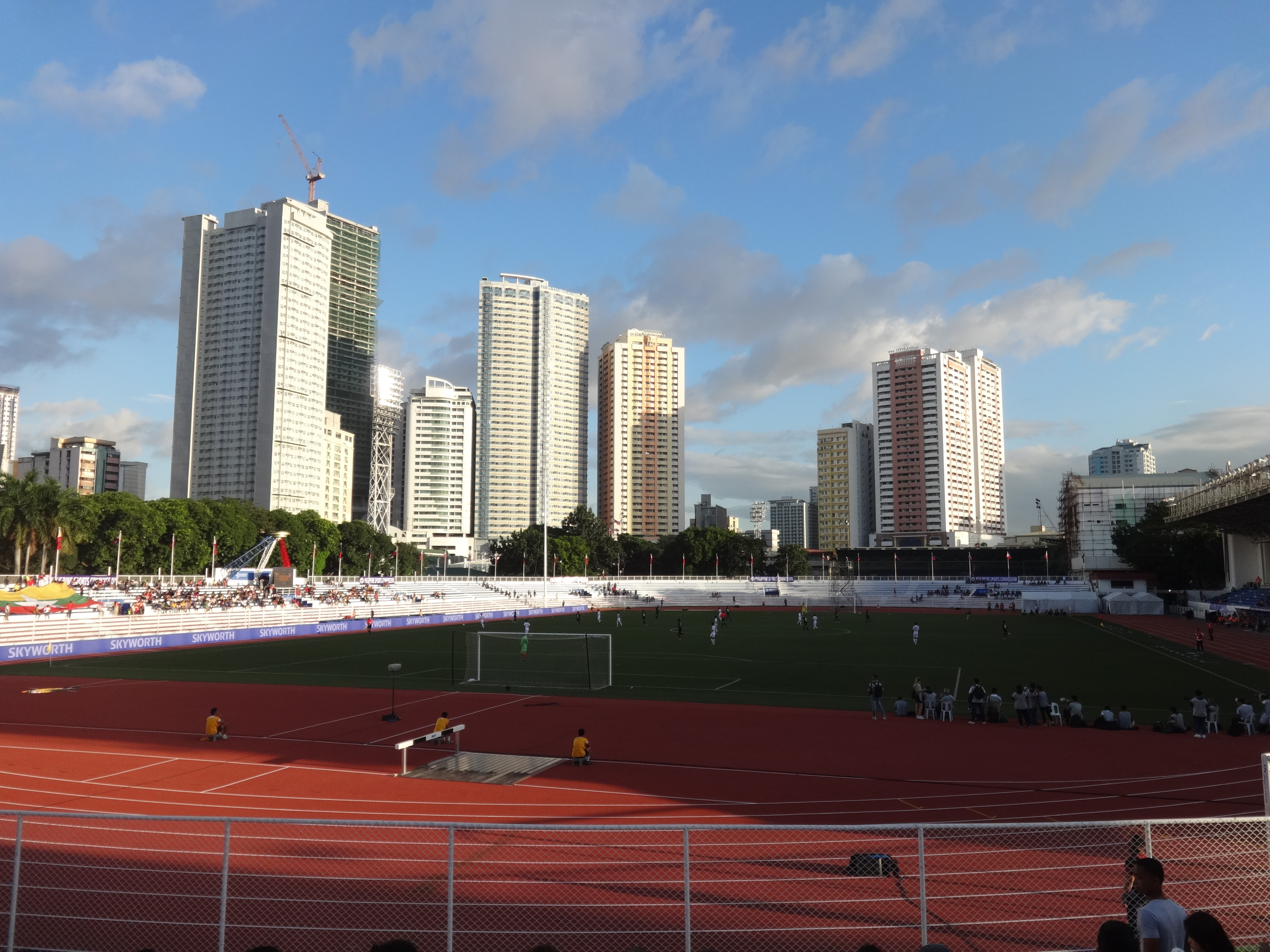
- The stadium in 2019
- Interactive map of Rizal Memorial Stadium
- Full name: Rizal Memorial Track and Football
- Location: Manila, Philippines
- Coordinates: 14°33′48.25″N 120°59′31.20″E
- Owner: City Government of Manila
- Operator: Philippine Sports Commission
- Capacity: 12,873 (seating); 15,000 (standing)
- Surface: Limonta Sport artificial turf (FIFA-certified)
- Field size: 105x68 m
- Public transit: Vito Cruz; 5 6 7 14 17 23 24 25 27 34 38 40 42 48 49 53 P. Ocampo

Construction
- Opened: 1934
- Renovated: 1953, 1981, 1991, 2005, 2011, 2019, 2021, 2025
- Architect: Juan Arellano

Tenants
- Philippines national football team Philippines women's national football team Philippines Football League; PFF Women's League; Copa Paulino Alcantara; University Athletic Association of the Philippines; National Collegiate Athletic Association (Philippines)

The Rizal Memorial Track and Football Stadium (simply known as the Rizal Memorial Stadium) is a stadium in Manila, Philippines. Part of the Rizal Memorial Sports Complex which is designated by the National Historical Commission of the Philippines as a historical landmark, it served as the main stadium of the 1954 Asian Games and the Southeast Asian Games on three occasions. The stadium is the official home of the Philippines national football teams and domestic matches.

== Background ==
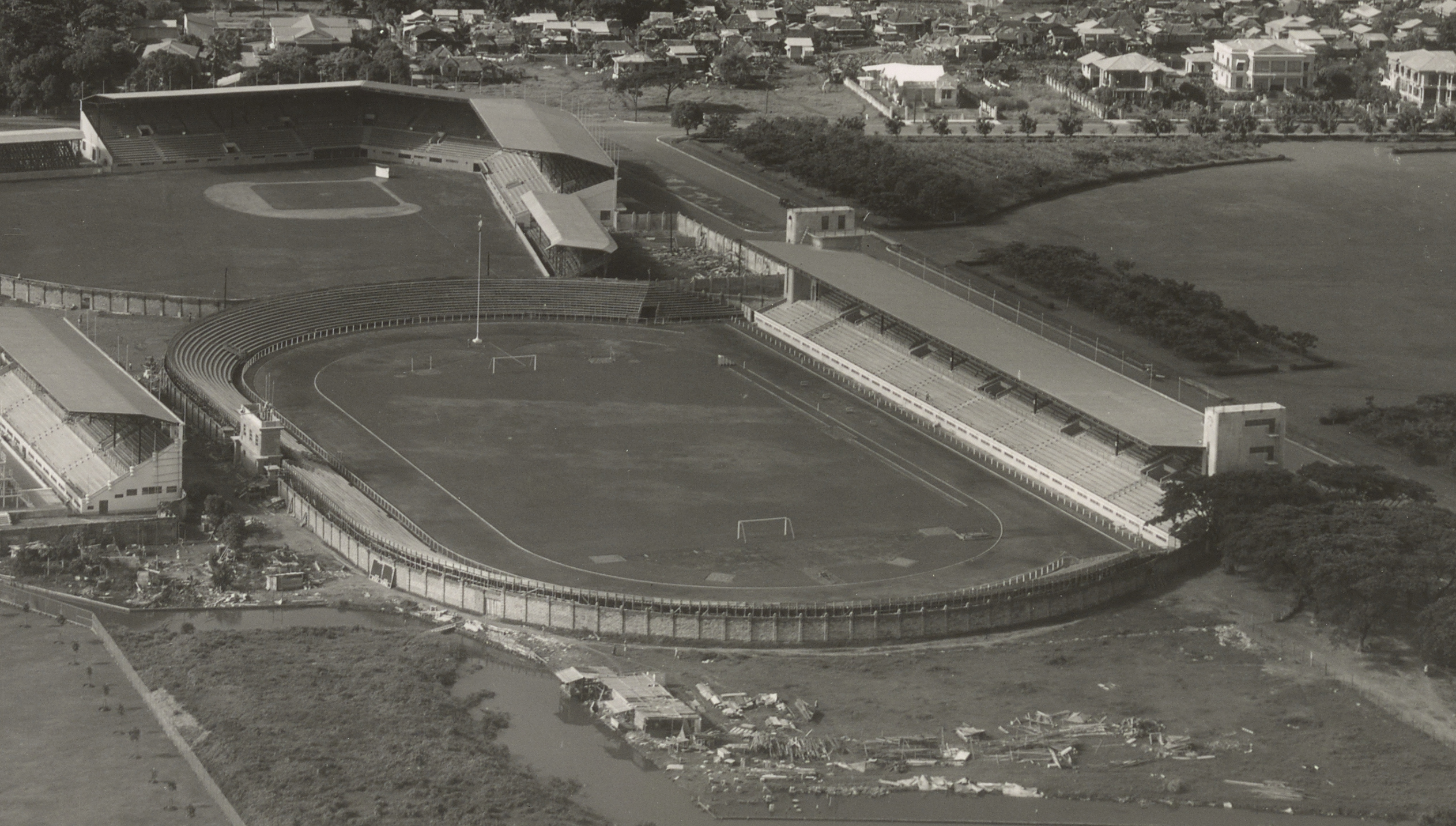
The Rizal Memorial Stadium in 1934

Since the 1930s, it has hosted all major local football tournaments and some international matches. (Note: The location of the Rizal Memorial Sports Complex was formerly known as the Manila Carnival Grounds. During this time, it also hosted local and international football matches.) When a new tartan track was laid out at the oval for the country's initial hosting of the 1981 Southeast Asian Games, the venue became a hub for athletics and the football pitch's condition slowly deteriorated. It eventually became unsuitable for international matches which meant the Philippine national team would have to play their home games at an alternate venue.

In 2010, the Philippine Sports Commission (PSC) partnered with the De La Salle University to refurbish the stadium's football pitch. The stadium had undergone a major renovation program with the Philippine Football Federation (PFF) spend ₱3.4 million for the renovation of the locker rooms, comfort rooms, and the fiberglass seats. The renovation was completed in 2011 and was first used for the game of Azkals against Sri Lanka in 2014 FIFA World Cup qualifiers round on July 3, 2011 which was the first international football game held at the stadium in the decades, where the Philippine national team won 4-0 overall. However, the pitch (which was a natural grass) deteriorated again due to the number of football and rugby events, that led the PSC to convert it into an artificial turf in 2014. In 2015, its football pitch received the 2-star accreditation from FIFA, making it the first football pitch in the Philippines to have it.

The stadium underwent a major renovation after it was designated as the venue for the men's football event of the 2019 Southeast Asian Games New individual seats were installed in the spectator area of the stadium outside the main grandstand. The renovation also included the upgrading of its rubberized track oval. The renovation was funded from the ₱842.5 million given by the Philippine Amusement and Gaming Corporation to the Philippine Sports Commission. In early 2025, the stadium's artificial pitch was replaced with a new one within a month and tested on April 11.

On November 15, 2026, the PSC signed an agreement with FIFA for the stadium's major expansion and rehabilitation. The plan, which will upgrade facilities and expand seating capacity to 25,000, is set to be funded through a portion of a US$25 million donation from FIFA for local football development and will be done alongside improvements across the sports complex.

== Sport ==
=== Athletics ===
Rizal Memorial has hosted several regional athletic meets, among the firsts being the 1934 Far Eastern Championship Games, the precursor of the Asian Games. It then went on to host the 1954 Asian Games. Aside from the athletic events, it also served as the main stadium for both of the multi-sport events. It also hosted the athletic events of the 2005 Southeast Asian Games and ASEAN Para Games.

It hosted regional athletic championships, hosting Asian Athletics Championships twice in 1993 and 2003. On a national level, the stadium has served as the venue for the Philippine Athletics Championships several times.

=== Football ===
==== Domestic ====
Rizal Memorial is the home to the Philippines Football League, hosting matches since the league's inaugural season in 2017, hosting matches during the 2017 Philippines Football League, 2018 Philippines Football League, 2019 Philippines Football League, 2022–23 Philippines Football League, and the 2024–25 Philippines Football League. It also hosts the matches for the Copa Paulino Alcantara. The football tournaments for the National Collegiate Athletics Association and University Athletic Association of the Philippines are held in the stadium. The 2023 PFF Women's League was also held at the stadium.

==== International ====
One of the first events held in the stadium is the football tournament of the 1934 Far Eastern Championship Games. The opening match between the Philippines and China on 12 May 1934 drew an estimated crowd of 40,000 people. China won the match 2–1, and eventually won the title. Other football tournaments of regional multi-sport events includes the 1954 Asian Games, the 1981, 1991, and 2019 Southeast Asian Games.

In 1966 and 1970, the AFC Youth Championship was held at Rizal Memorial.

The 2012 and 2014 Philippine Peace Cup were held in the stadium.

AFC Champions League tournaments were also held in the stadium:

- 2017 AFC Cup
- 2018 AFC Cup
- 2020 AFC Cup
- 2020 AFC Champions League qualifying play-offs

Other events held at the stadium:

- 2012 and 2014 AFF Suzuki Cup Semifinals
- 2014 AFC Challenge Cup qualification Group E
- 2027 AFC Asian Cup qualification
- 2023–24 AFC Champions League
- 2023–24 AFC Cup
- 2025-26 AFC Challenge League knockout stage

==== ASEAN Championships ====
Edition	Date	Time	Team #1	Result	Team #2	Round	Spectators
2016 AFF Suzuki Cup	25 November 2016	20:00 UTC+8	Singapore	1–2	Indonesia	Group stage	467
2022 AFF Championship	23 December 2022	18:00 UTC+8	Philippines	5–1	Brunei	Group stage	1,650
2022 AFF Championship	2 January 2023	20:30 UTC+8	Philippines	1–2	Indonesia	Group stage	2,370
2024 ASEAN Championship	12 December 2024	18:30 UTC+8	Philippines	1–1	Myanmar	Group stage	1,589
2024 ASEAN Championship	18 December 2024	21:00 UTC+8	Philippines	1–1	Vietnam	Group stage	3,346
2024 ASEAN Championship	27 December 2024	21:00 UTC+8	Philippines	2–1	Thailand	Semifinals Leg 1	10,087

==== 2022 AFF Women's Championship ====
Date	Time	Team #1	Result	Team #2	Round	Spectators
4 July 2022	16:00 UTC+8	Singapore	0–0	Malaysia	Group stage	235
4 July 2022	19:00 UTC+8	Philippines	1–0	Australia	Group stage	1,408
6 July 2022	16:00 UTC+8	Thailand	2–2	Australia	Group stage	207
6 July 2022	19:00 UTC+8	Philippines	7–0	Singapore	Group stage	647
8 July 2022	16:00 UTC+8	Australia	4–0	Indonesia	Group stage	
8 July 2022	19:00 UTC+8	Malaysia	0–4	Philippines	Group stage	429
10 July 2022	16:00 UTC+8	Singapore	1–4	Australia	Group stage	334
10 July 2022	19:00 UTC+8	Philippines	4–1	Indonesia	Group stage	1,464
12 July 2022	16:00 UTC+8	Thailand	1–0	Philippines	Group stage	2,923
13 July 2022	19:00 UTC+8	Vietnam	4–0	Myanmar	Group stage	157
15 July 2022	16:00 UTC+8	Thailand	2–0	Myanmar	Semi-finals	
15 July 2022	20:00 UTC+8	Vietnam	0–4	Philippines	Semi-finals	3,233
17 July 2022	16:00 UTC+8	Myanmar	4–3	Vietnam	Third place match	
17 July 2022	19:30 UTC+8	Thailand	0–3	Philippines	Final	8,257

==== FIFA World Cup Qualification ====
- 2014 FIFA World Cup qualification
- 2026 FIFA World Cup qualification – AFC second round

Date	Time	Team #1	Result	Team #2	Round	Spectators
16 November 2023	19:00 UTC+8	Philippines	0–2	Vietnam	Second round	10,378
21 November 2023	19:00 UTC+8	Philippines	1–1	Indonesia	Second round	9,880
26 March 2024	19:00 UTC+8	Philippines	0–5	Iraq	Second round	10,014

=== Rugby ===
The first international rugby test in the stadium was held when the Philippines hosted the 2012 Asian Five Nations Division I tournament, which doubled as a qualifying tournament for the 2015 Rugby World Cup; the goal posts were erected just days prior to the tournament.

== Other purposes ==
=== Concert ===
On July 4, 1966, the Rizal Memorial Stadium hosted two sold-out concerts of the Beatles. The combined attendance was 80,000 with the evening concert registering 50,000 paying audience and becoming the Beatles' second-biggest concert ever.

Add to this, a celebrity had concert in this Stadium “The Vic Damone Show” held on 24 December 1960. A huge audience attended his concert in the evening.

List of concerts showing date, headlining artist or band, name of concert or tour and opening acts
Date	Headlining artist	Concert or tour	Opening acts	Attendance
4 July 1966	The Beatles	Asian Tour 1966	Reycard Duet, Wing Duo, Pilita Corrales	est 50,000
16 December 1978	Asin			
15 February 1992	New Kids on the Block	No More Games Tour		
11 December 1985	Pops Fernandez	Always Pops		

=== COVID-19 pandemic ===
During the government's "Hatid Tulong" program, the stadium was used as the designated temporary holding place for Locally Stranded Individuals (LSIs). With the stadium being full, many other individuals who availed of the said program ended up sleeping and gathering outside.

== See also ==
- List of football stadiums in the Philippines
- New Clark City Athletics Stadium
- Philippine Sports Stadium
- Biñan Football Stadium
- Panaad Stadium
- PFF National Training Center

== Notes ==
Preceded by Stadium Merdeka; Kuala Lumpur	Asian Athletics Championships; Venue; 1993	Succeeded by Gelora Bung Karno Stadium; Jakarta
Preceded by Sugathadasa Stadium; Colombo	Asian Athletics Championships; Venue; 2003	Succeeded by Munhak Stadium; Incheon
