= Philippines at the 2009 World Championships in Athletics =

- WA code: PHI
- National federation: Philippine Athletics Track and Field Association

in Berlin 15 August 2009 – 23 August 2009
- Competitors: 2 (1 man and 1 woman)
- Medals: Gold 0 Silver 0 Bronze 0 Total 0

World Championships in Athletics appearances
- 1983; 1987; 1991; 1993; 1995; 1997; 1999; 2001; 2003; 2005; 2007; 2009; 2011; 2013; 2015; 2017; 2019; 2022; 2023; 2025

Philippines competed at the 2009 World Championships in Athletics from 15–23 August. A team of 2 athletes was announced in preparation for the competition.

== Results ==
=== Men ===
Field events

Athlete	Event	Qualification		Final	
Athlete	Event	Distance	Position	Distance	Position
Henry Dagmil	Long Jump	NM	—N/a	Did not advance	

=== Women ===
Field events

Athlete	Event	Qualification		Final	
Athlete	Event	Distance	Position	Distance	Position
Marestella Torres	Long Jump	6.22	29	Did not advance	
