= Datu Yusoph Boyog Mama =

Filipino politician and government official

- Born: June 19, 1954 (age 72); Marawi, Lanao del Sur, Philippines
- Education: Mindanao State University (B.S. International Relations) Webster University
- Spouse: Bai-a-labi Omairah Dangcal Didato Mama

Datu Yusoph Boyog Mama (born June 19, 1954) is a Filipino politician and government official. He was the lone candidate representing the province of Lanao del Sur, one of the five (5) provinces constituting the ARMM territory, for the office of Autonomous Region in Muslim Mindanao (ARMM) Regional Governor in the previous 2013 Mid-term Elections. With the support of various key multi-sectoral groups in the province of Lanao del Sur and the provincial capital Islamic City of Marawi, Datu Yusoph B. Mama ran as an independent candidate.

Previous to his candidacy, he had been serving as the Regional Director of the Department of Agrarian Reform in Southern Mindanao - Region XI (Davao City). A Muslim technocrat and Moro leader from the Islamic City of Marawi, province of Lanao del Sur, he was elected and served as the first Filipino-Muslim president of the National Council of Career Executive Service Organizations (NCCESO), now known as the National Union of Career Executive Service Officers (NUCESO), leading the council in the mid-1990s.

Long identified as a strong supporter and advocate of health, peace and development through the promotion of local (grassroots) and national sports programs, he currently sits as an executive member of the nine-man board of directors of the Athletics sports federation and its national governing body, the Philippine Athletics Track and Field Association.

== Background ==
Datu Yusoph Boyog Mama was born on June 19, 1954, in the city of Dansalan (now Marawi), Lanao del Sur. While in college, he was a consistent scholar and became the Umbrella Chairman of the Students' Assistance Committees (E.O. 306) in the Mindanao State University and other Northern Mindanao universities in 1973 to 1976. He finished his degree in Bachelor of Science in International Relations in the Mindanao State University in Marawi City, and he later pursued Graduate Executive Education programs in Webster University, for International Business and Politics (U.N.O.V.), and in the Development Academy of the Philippines, for Governance Management and Public Administration. He was awarded as one of the Mindanao State University (MSU) System outstanding alumni (Sarimanok awardees), the highest award given by MSU System during its Golden Jubilee Celebration. He is married to Queen Omairah Dangcal Didato Mama, the Bai-a-labi sa Marawi (Traditional Queen of Marawi).

Datu Yusoph B. Mama, better known as a traditional Moro leader in his capacity as Masirikampo sa Marawi (traditional royal ruler of Marawi) was identified as a staunch supporter of the Government of the Philippines – Moro Islamic Liberation Front (GPH-MILF) Peace Talks. From the inception of the initiatives executed by members of the respective peace panels, as well as the generally perceived unorthodox approach of the Government of the Philippines (2010-2016) in handling negotiations with the leaders of the Moro Rebellion (MILF bloc), he has consistently rallied support to contribute and further generate morale to effectively promote an enabling social-climate amongst stakeholders in Muslim Mindanao.

== Career ==
Datu Yusoph Mama had been in the government service for almost four (4) decades.

=== in the Foreign Service ===
In 1977, Datu Yusoph Mama started his professional career in the Foreign Service when he became a Foreign Trade Analyst in the Bureau of Foreign Trade in Makati, Metro Manila. He became an Acting Commercial Attaché in the Philippine Embassies in Lagos, Nigeria (1978) and in Vienna, Austria (1981). He was also designated as an Economic Adviser in the International Atomic Energy Agency (IAEA) in the United Nations Center in Vienna, Austria (1981).

=== in the Agrarian Reform ===
In 1988, Datu Yusoph Mama became a Regional Director in the Department of Agrarian Reform (DAR). He was assigned for nine years in Central Mindanao - Region XII, where he was elected as President of the Association of the Regional Directors and Executives of Region XII (ARDE-XII) in 1989 to 1997. He became the National President of the National Council of Career Executive Service Organizations (NCCESO) in 1994. The NCCESO, presently organized as the National Union of Career Executive Service Officers (NUCESO), is the official national organization of all regional and central office associations composed of officials in the career executive service who are either CESOs, CES Eligibles and non-CES Eligibles.

He was also assigned in various regions in Visayas and Mindanao: i.e., Zamboanga Peninsula - Region IX, Caraga - Region XIII, Central Visayas - Region VII and Southern Mindanao - Region XI. He was the concurrent Project Manager on Foreign-Assisted Projects (FAPs) during his assignments in DAR-VII and DAR-XI. The FAPs are multi-billion foreign-assisted projects implemented by DAR gearing toward poverty alleviation and attainment of peace in rural areas.

He served as the Chairman of the DA-DAR-DENR Regional Convergence Initiative (RCI) on Rural Development in Region XI and the National President of the DAR Association of Regional Directors and Executives (DARE).

== Candidacy for the ARMM Gubernatorial Race ==
Datu Yusoph Mama's showing of support and a professional determination to contribute in helping push an improved Muslim Mindanao region, through the GPH-MILF Peace Talks which eventually resulted to the Bangsamoro Framework Agreement (BFA) which basis is envisioned to create a genuine autonomous region (Bangsamoro Entity) superseding the ARMM, has earned him the vote of confidence of the Mindanao Business Council (MBC) based in the Southern Philippines. The MBC organization was then rooting for a local leader who can help best uplift and dramatically reform the socioeconomic conditions of the region, at a critical time, by strategically supporting a seasoned bureaucratic manager and a tested technocrat in the political helm. Datu Yusoph Mama was therefore considered and strongly recommended by the leadership of said business consortium, among other sectoral groups in the Southern Philippines, as their choice for the ARMM- Regional Governor officer-in-charge (OIC) after the postponed ARMM elections in 2011. A passing excerpt from the official communication of the organization for Malacañan (Office of the President) provided: “… Giving the much needed attention to the people of ARMM and its economy, and introducing positive reforms in governance will greatly help the region realize a holistic transformation.'

Among those whom [the MBC] believe[s] can contribute to ARMM’s development is Datu Yusoph Boyog Mama. His dedication as a public servant and his professional experience defines his worth…”

With surmounting local public clamor from key Lanao-based multi-sectoral groups insisting on having a candidate represent the province of Lanao del Sur in the 2013 ARMM synchronized elections, including the fact that the ongoing progress in the GPH-MILF Peace Talks promises a scenario of positive public support for the Moro Islamic Liberation Front (MILF) leadership participating in a better integrated Bangsamoro society for the expected 2016 National Elections, Datu Mama was convinced to file his candidacy for ARMM Governorship as an independent candidate. Chairman Nur Misuari (Moro National Liberation Front founding chairman) from Sulu province and Sultan Pax Mangudadatu from Maguindanao province were also independent candidates.

The Honorable Regional Governor Mujiv Sabbihi Hataman, the ruling Administration political party's candidate, from the province of Basilan won the 2013 candidacy by a decisive landslide amidst widespread complaints and allegations of massive electoral fraud and cheating region-wide in the ARMM.

=== previous political nominations and alliances ===
With respect to previous political exposure, Datu Yusoph Boyog Mama had received high-level nominations by dominant political parties in the past, including the following national conventions:

He was the top (first) party choice for Senatorial candidate, representing Western Mindanao (Muslim Mindanao), by a unanimous official nomination by all ARMM provincial governors during the 1991 LDP (Laban ng Demokratikong Pilipino) National Party Convention (Mitra-Ramos Convention).

He was also subsequently strongly recommended by ARMM social and civic stakeholders, non-government organizations (NGOs), the Ulama Council (led by then Lanao del Sur Governor Maheed Mutilan, Aleem Mohammad Saranggani and Aleem Salic Usman), the Rotary International and some local regional politicians as their top pick for ARMM- Regional Governor candidate for the 1993 ARMM Elections. Datu Mama had not pursued the aforementioned political nominations or endorsements at the time, instead he voluntarily deferred and supported the aspiration of the late Honorable Atty. Lininding Pangandaman for his candidacy for ARMM Governorship in 1993 who was then subsequently elected to the position.

== Philanthropist, Composer and National Sports Exponent ==
In the 1990s, Datu Yusoph Mama initiated the founding of the KAPDI Program, a charity program and provincial drive which was envisioned to be a positive social catalyst, which strategically catered to the needs of the poorest people in Lanao del Sur. In line with his philanthropic works, he strengthened his advocacy by composing and producing the Kapdi songs, a localized phenomenal album of 12 Maranao songs about mercy and kindness intended to inspire social altruism within the provincial community.

He was active and served as the Regional Council Chairman of the Boy Scouts of the Philippines (BSP) - Western Mindanao Council while he was concurrently the Chairman of the Lanao del Sur and Marawi City BSP Council in 1993 to 1995. He also became a past president of the Rotary Club of Marawi West (RY 1992-1994) and a Paul Harris Fellow of the Rotary International District 3870.

Datu Yusoph Mama was named to the nine-man Board of Directors of the Philippine Athletics Track and Field Association (PATAFA) during the Philippine Olympic Committee (POC) sanctioned-elections in the first quarter of 2015. The PATAFA is the national governing body for athletics sports in the Philippines, otherwise constituting the decathlon in the world Olympics; and it is a member of the Asian Athletics Association (AAA) as well as the World Athletics.

== Traditional Leader ==
Datu Yusoph Mama was enthroned in 1985 as the Masirikampo sa Marawi (Traditional Royal Ruler of Marawi). This is a lifetime royal title.
