= Philippines at the 1993 World Championships in Athletics =

- WA code: PHI
- National federation: Philippine Athletics Track and Field Association

in Tokyo August 13–22, 1993
- Competitors: 2 (2 women) in 3 events
- Medals: Gold 0 Silver 0 Bronze 0 Total 0

World Championships in Athletics appearances
- 1983; 1987; 1991; 1993; 1995; 1997; 1999; 2001; 2003; 2005; 2007; 2009; 2011; 2013; 2015; 2017; 2019; 2022; 2023; 2025

Philippines competed at the 1993 World Championships in Athletics in Stuttgart, Germany, from August 13 to 22, 1993. The Philippines fielded 2 athletes who competed in 3 events.

== Results ==
=== Women ===
Track and road events

Athlete	Event	Heat		Quarterfinal		Semifinal		Final	
Athlete	Event	Result	Rank	Result	Rank	Result	Rank	Result	Rank
Lydia de Vega	100 metres	12.24	6	Did not advance					
Lydia de Vega	200 metres	DNS		Did not advance					

Field events

Athlete	Event	Qualification		Final	
Athlete	Event	Distance	Position	Distance	Position
Elma Muros	Long Jump	5.99	15	Did not advance	
