= Chrissy Boodram =

English journalist (born 1973)

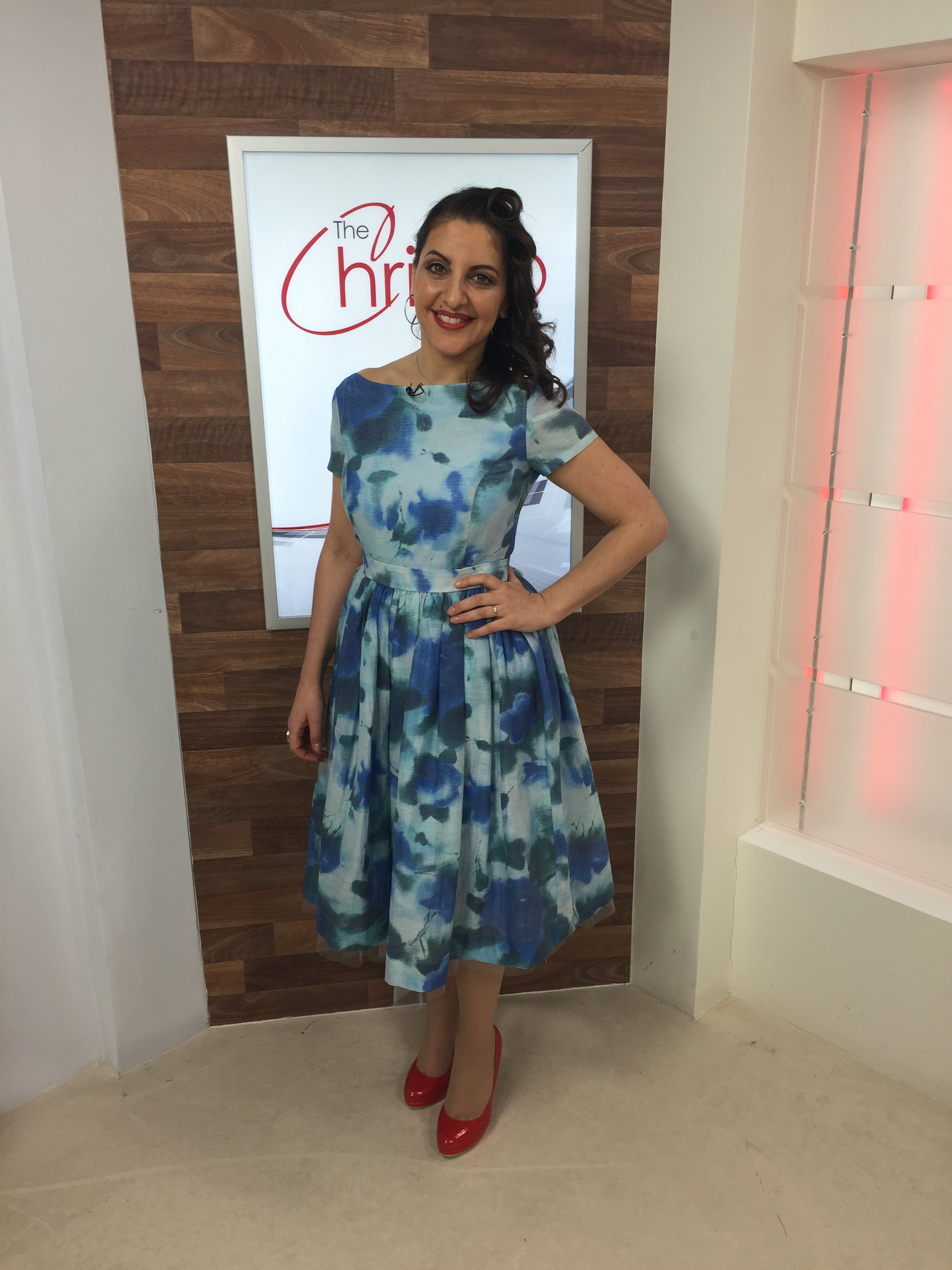
- Born: 16 September 1973 (age 52); Brixton, London, England
- Television: The Chrissy B Show
- Spouse: Michael Boodram
- Awards: The Global Woman Award - Best Cover Story 2017; British Citizen Award for contribution to society; International Achievement Award; UK Health Radio’s Outstanding Contribution Award
- Website: Official website

Christoulla Boodram (born 16 September 1973) and known professionally as Chrissy B, is an English journalist, author, television presenter, TV producer and mental health speaker, best known as the host of The Chrissy B Show.

== Early life ==
Boodram was born in Brixton, London. She studied human resources and web and graphic design at university. She started out with press and community outreach projects before becoming a TV presenter.

== Career ==
She presents various women's conventions and live events and hosted the Love School event at Wembley Arena for an audience of over 11,000 in 2013 and 2014. She also holds talks on mental health in Higher Education.

=== Television ===
Since 2012, Boodram has presented her own show focusing on mental health. It is the only show in the UK that dedicates itself to this subject. Over the years Boodram has presented many TV shows. Her first was Your Say, a controversial current affairs show. And another that focussed on helping people find solutions to life's problems. She has also guest presented many shows including Different Kind of Woman.

=== Depression ===
At the age of Sixteen, Boodram started getting panic attacks, and started to suffer from depression. During this time she met her now husband Michael. At the start, Boodram described their relationship as a 'combination of obsessive behaviour, arguments and eventually physical fights', mainly prompted by Boodram herself, due to her depression. She came through and they have now been happily married for 16 years. Boodram has spoken out on many TV shows and events in regards to her depression and mental health issues. She also set up a website to write about mental health.

=== Awards ===
Chrissy has won many awards for her work. She won 'The Global Woman Award' for Best Cover Story 2017 and in 2018 she received a 'British Citizen Award' for exceptional contribution to society. Also in 2018, she received an 'International Achievement Recognition' award and in 2019, UK Health Radio’s Outstanding Contribution award.

== Books ==
- My Life After Depression- (E-Book) Online Only
- Depression – it's PAYBACK time! Autobiography (2019)
