= PhilSports Football and Athletics Stadium =

Stadium in Pasig, Philippines

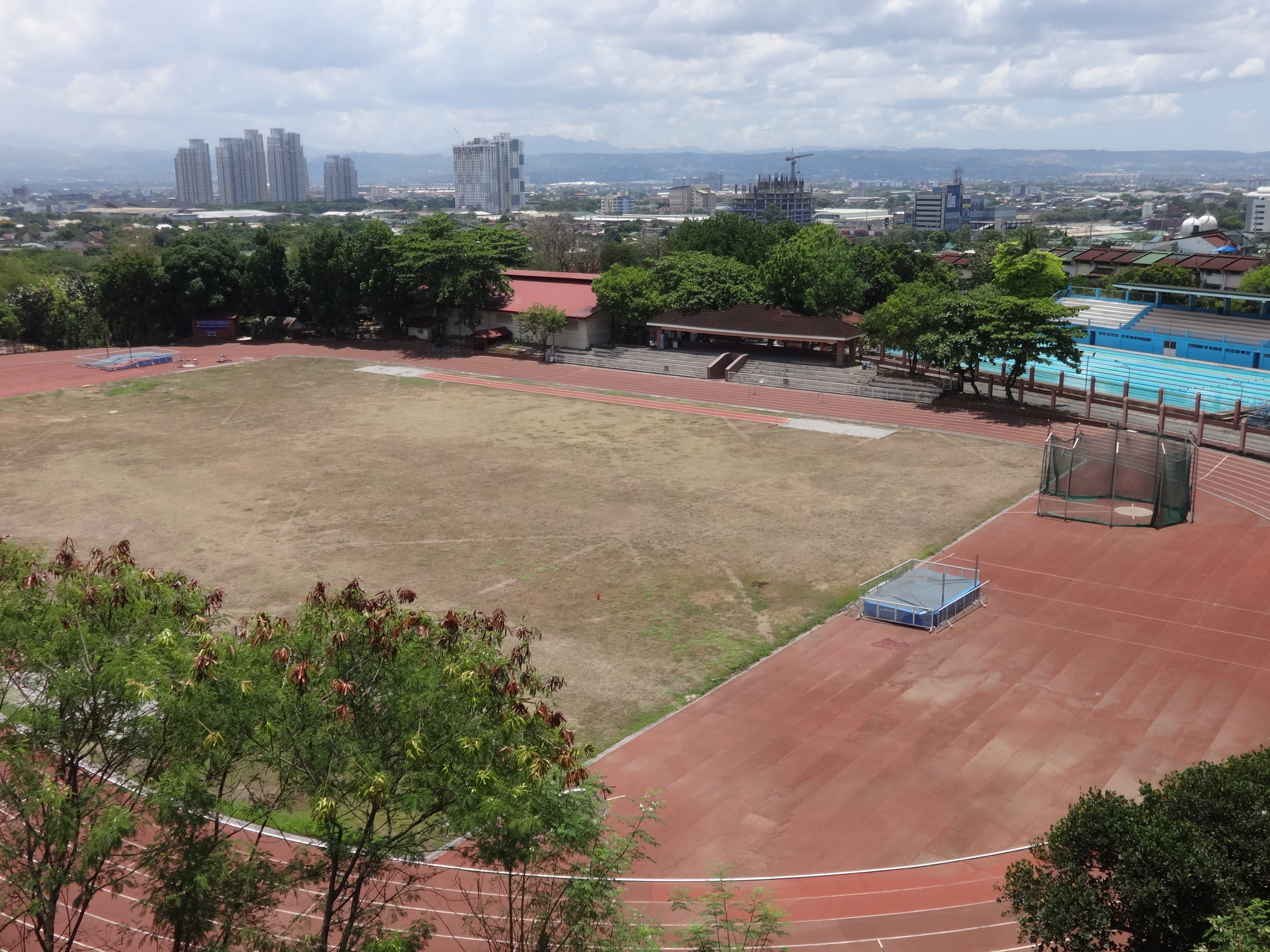
- Interactive map of PhilSports Football and Athletics Stadium
- Location: Oranbo, Pasig, Metro Manila, Philippines
- Coordinates: 14°34′39″N 121°03′58″E
- Owner: Philippine Sports Commission
- Operator: Philippine Sports Commission
- Capacity: 15,000

Tenants
- National Capital Region FA; Philippines national football team Philippines women's national football team Philippine Tackle Football League; UAAP; PATAFA Weekly Relay Series

The Philippine Institute of Sports Football and Athletics Stadium, formerly known as the ULTRA Stadium (University of Life Training and Recreational Arena), is a stadium located inside the PhilSports Complex in Oranbo, Pasig, Metro Manila, Philippines. It was the host of the 2002 World Cup qualifiers between Philippines and Laos.

The stadium was the site of the PhilSports Stadium stampede on February 4, 2006.

Its capacity was 15,000 people.

The stadium is used annually for both the UAAP and NCAA athletics and track and field tournaments, as well as the PATAFA Weekly Relay Series.

== See also ==
- PhilSports Complex
- PhilSports Stadium stampede
