= PhilSports Arena =

Public indoor arena in Pasig, Philippines

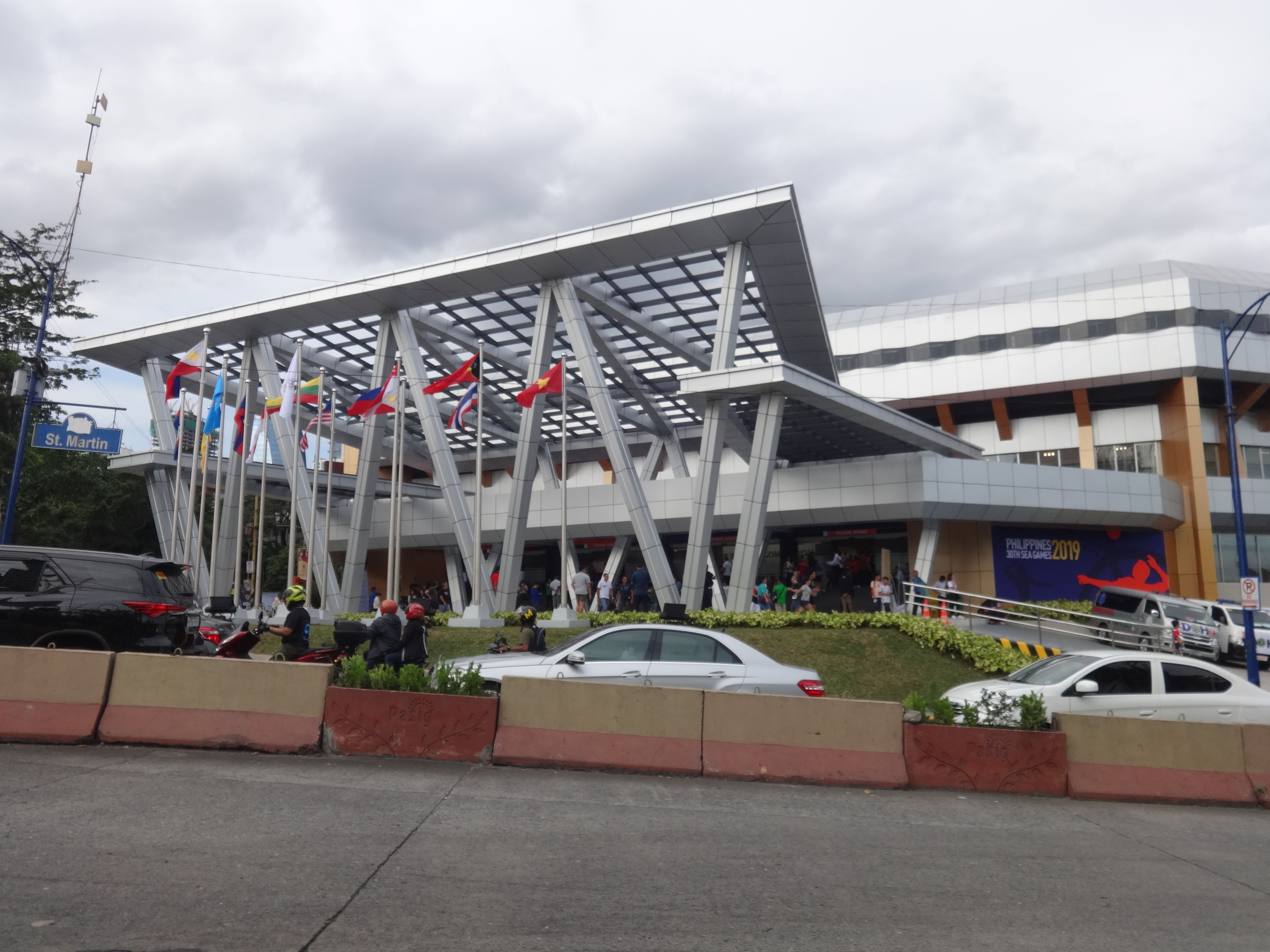
- The PhilSports Arena in 2019 after renovation
- Interactive map of PhilSports Arena
- Former names: PSC-National Academy of Sports Arena; PSC Sports Arena; University of Life Theater and Recreational Arena (ULTRA)
- Location: Pasig, Metro Manila, Philippines
- Coordinates: 14°34′39″N 121°03′58″E
- Owner: Philippine Sports Commission
- Operator: Philippine Sports Commission
- Capacity: 10,000

Construction
- Opened: 1985
- Renovated: 2019, 2025

Tenants
- PBA (1980s–1990s); PVL (2017–2018, 2022–2025); PFF Futsaliga (2026–present); UAAP (2026–present); NCAA (2026–present)

The Philippine Institute of Sports Multi-Purpose Arena or PhilSports Arena is an indoor sporting arena located inside the PhilSports Complex in Pasig, Metro Manila, Philippines. It was formerly known as the University of Life Theater and Recreational Arena or the ULTRA. The arena is part of the PhilSports Complex which is maintained by the Philippine Sports Commission.

== History ==
The PhilSports Arena in 2014 prior to the 2019 renovation

The PhilSports Arena first opened to the public in 1985 and is part of the larger PhilSports Complex. By 2015, the condition of the indoor arena have deteriorated.

The arena was given a major renovation in time for the 2019 Southeast Asian Games The arena underwent renovations again ahead of the 2025 FIFA Futsal Women's World Cup

== Sports ==
=== Basketball ===
The Philippine Basketball Association regularly used the PhilSports Arena from its opening in 1985 until the early 1990s.

=== Volleyball ===
The Philisports Arena was the venue of the 2000 FIVB Volleyball World Grand Prix. It also served as one of the hosts of the preliminary round of the 2005 Grand Prix.

The then-newly renovated arena served as the venue of the volleyball tournaments of the 2019 SEA Games. It also served as a venue for the Premier Volleyball League in 2017 and 2018 and later from 2022 to 2025.

Among the continental-level tournaments hosted at the arena are the 2022 Asian Women's Volleyball Cup and the 2025 AVC Women's Volleyball Champions League The Philsports Arena hosted the second week of the 2026 FIVB Women's Volleyball Nations League in June 2026, its first world-level volleyball tournament.

=== Futsal ===
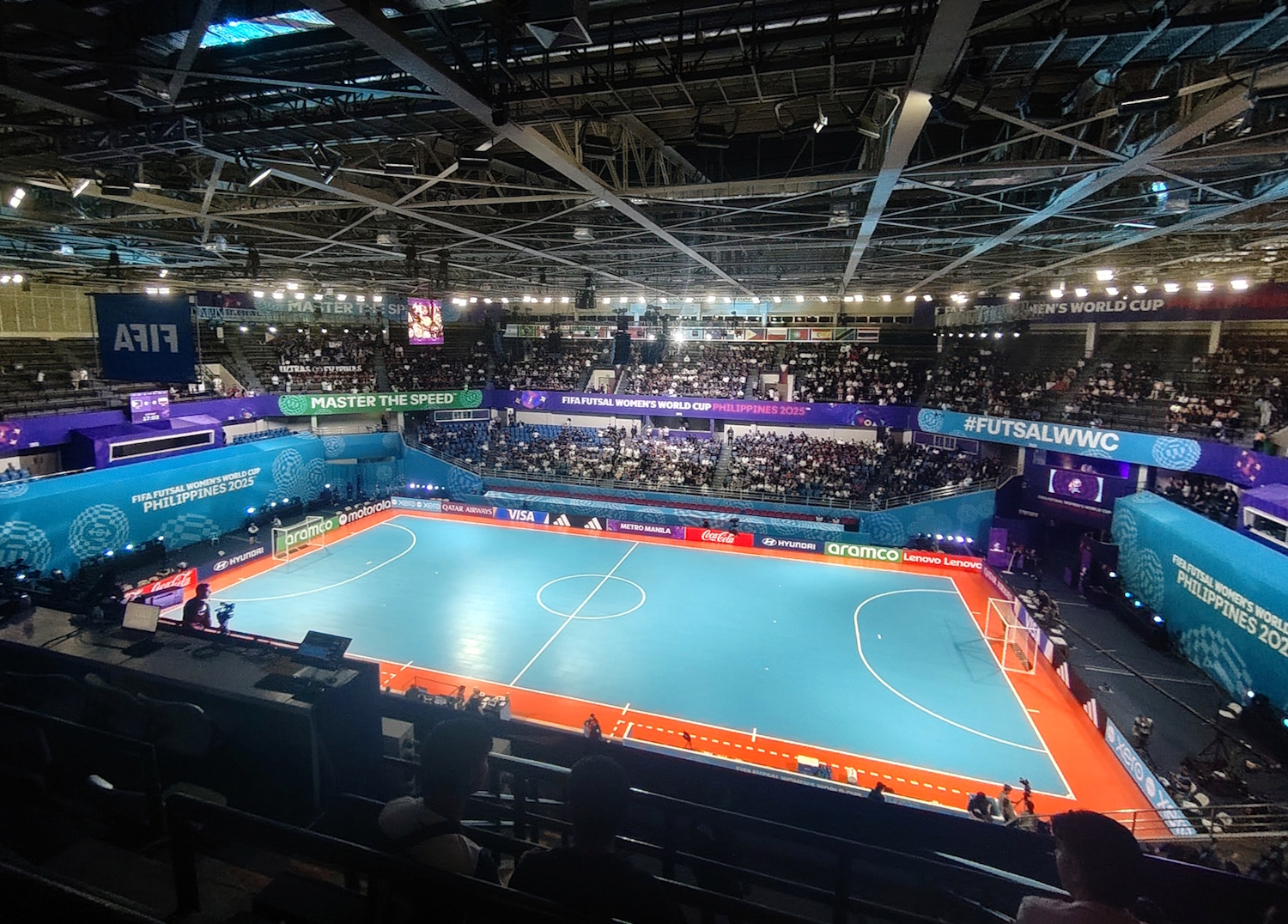
The interior of the PhilSports Arena during the 2025 FIFA Futsal Women's World Cup

The 2025 FIFA Futsal Women's World Cup, the first ever FIFA event hosted in the Philippines was held at the PhilSports Arena from November 21 to December 7, 2025. The regional 2024 ASEAN Women's Futsal Championship was also held as a precursor to the world cup.

In January 2026, the venue was committed to be a futsal venue. In February 2026, the inaugural season of the PFF Futsaliga began.

=== Other sports ===
The badminton competition of the 2005 SEA Games was held in the PhilSports Arena. It will also host the playoffs of Season 18 of the esports league MPL Philippines.

== See also ==
- Philippine Sports Commission

Preceded by first arena Cuneta Astrodome	Host of the PBA All-Star Game; 1989–1992; 1999	Succeeded by Cuneta Astrodome; University of San Agustin
