= Philip Juico =

Filipino sports executive and agriculture official (1947–2026)

Phillip Juico
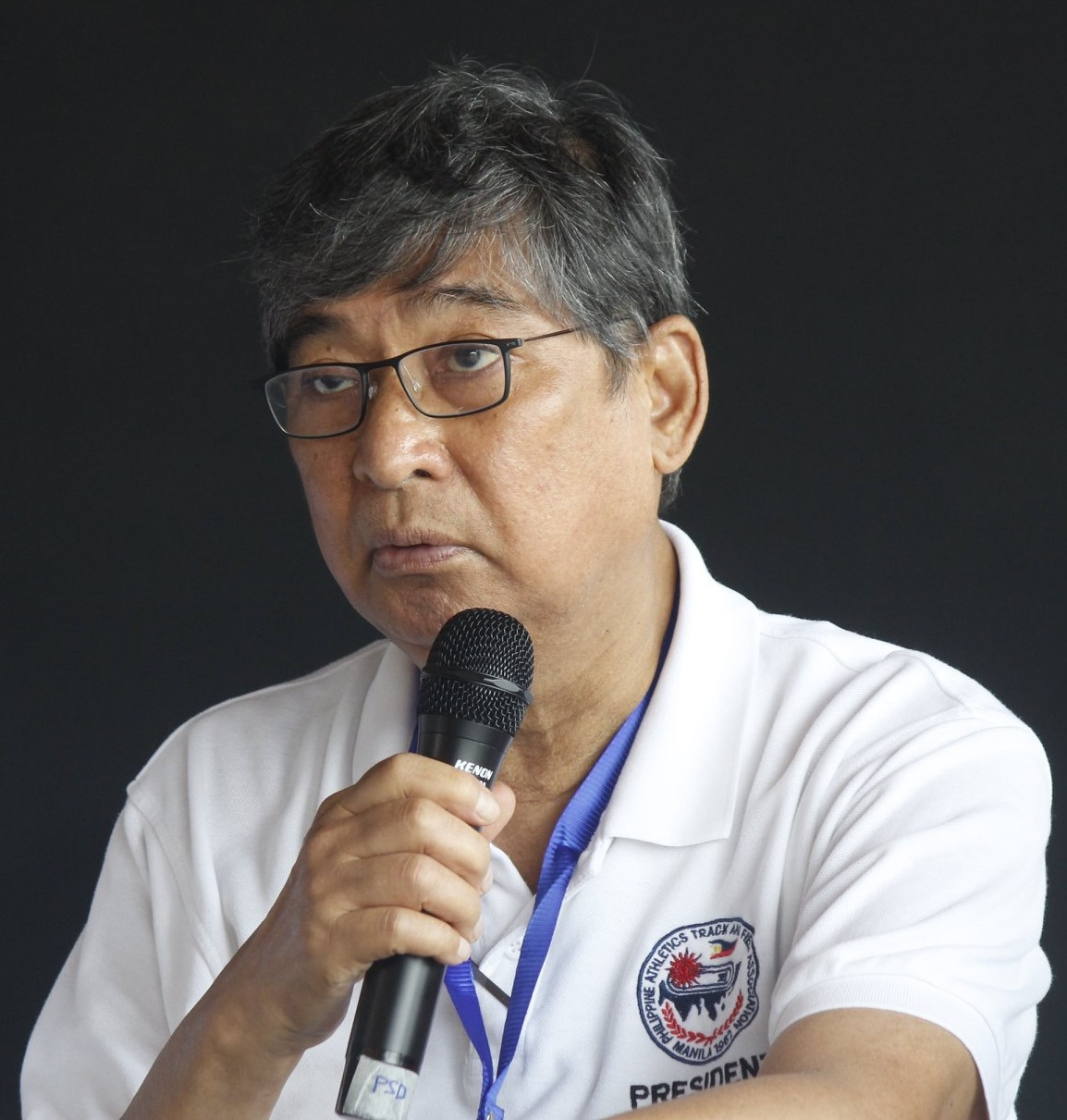

4th Chairman of the Philippine Sports Commission
- In office 1996 – June 30, 1998
- Preceded by: Mel Lopez
- Succeeded by: Carlos Tuazon

3rd Secretary of Agrarian Reform
- In office July 23, 1987 – July 1, 1989
- Preceded by: Heherson Alvarez
- Succeeded by: Miriam Defensor Santiago

Personal details
- Born: Philip Ella Juico; December 14, 1947
- Died: October 31, 2026 (aged 78) Makati, Philippines
- Spouse: Margarita Penson
- Children: 4
- Education: De La Salle University

Philip Ella Juico (December 14, 1947 – October 31, 2026) was a Filipino sports official. He was president of the Philippine Athletics Track and Field Association (PATAFA), the NSA for athletics in the Philippines, from 2015 to 2022.

Juico served as Secretary of Agrarian Reform from 1987 to 1989. He was Dean of the Graduate School of Business of De La Salle Professional Schools in the Philippines from 2002 to 2008.

== Early life and education ==
Philip Ella Juico was born on December 14, 1947. He studied at De La Salle University. He finished his elementary and high school studies in De La Salle in 1961 and 1965 respectively. He obtained his AB-BSC degree from the same institution in 1970. In his high school years, he was a sports writer for the official high school student publication, The LaSallite, while during his college years, he was part of The LaSallian, serving as its Sports section editor from 1969 to 1970, and serving as its associate editor throughout 1970.

De La Salle University inducted Juico into its Sports Hall of Fame in 2001 for his contribution to Philippine sports.

== Career ==
=== Business ===
For much of his early career, Juico was a consultant to Philippine AgriBusiness.

1986–1987: Deputy Minister, Department of Environment and Natural Resources

1986–1987: Assistant Secretary, Department of Agriculture and Food

1987–1992: concurrent positions as a director of the Land Bank of the Philippines and the Development Bank of the Philippines, as a member of the board of the Development Academy of the Philippines, National Economic Development Authority and Population Commission; and as chairman of the National Agribusiness Corporation and the National Social Action Council.

1987–1992: Chairman, Cabinet Cluster on Rural Development and as Cabinet Officer for Regional Development (CORD) for the Cordillera Administrative Region (CAR).

=== Government ===
On July 22, 1987, President Corazon Aquino signed Proclamation No. 131 which instituted the Comprehensive Agrarian Reform Program (CARP) as a major program of the government. It provided for a special fund known as the Agrarian Reform Fund (ARF), with an initial amount of Php50 billion to cover the estimated cost of the program from 1987 to 1992. Juico was appointed by Aquino to lead the CARP program.

Juico served as Secretary of the Department of Agrarian Reform from 1987 to 1989 under President Corazon Aquino.

He resigned in 1989 after the Garchitorena land scam, which undermined Aquino's agrarian reform program and prompted an investigation of government officials' alleged involvement in the scam. Juico had been accused of violating an anti-corruption law by signing a land-purchase agreement that would have cost the government about $2.7 million. The 4,660 acres of largely non-arable, hilly land in Garchitorena, Camarines Sur was purchased for about $142,600 by a private firm, which then tried to sell it to the government less than a year later for nearly $2.9 million.

Juico was exonerated in the case by the Sandiganbayan, a special anti-graft court, on July 16, 1992. The court found no proof that Juico took part in any "willful attempt to defraud the government" and that he was not obliged "to personally scrutinize all the technical and legal details" of the land deal. Thus the court upheld Juico's denials of accusations by congressional critics that he had been negligent in signing a January 1989 agreement to buy the overvalued land for distribution to farmers. Criminal charges were never pursued against lower-ranking officials.

He ran in the 1992 House of Representatives elections with Aquino's endorsement but was defeated.

=== Sports ===
Juico was also the fourth chairperson of the Philippine Sports Commission (PSC) of the government from 1996 to 1998. He also has served as chairman of the Philippine Super Liga, a women's volleyball league. In 2015, Juico was elected as president of Philippine Athletics Track and Field Association (PATAFA). He was reelected to the post in 2021. He resigned on June 18, 2022 as the PATAFA chairman and was succeeded by Terry Capistrano.

He was also the Vice President and Chairman of the School and Youth Commission of the Asian Athletics Association.

==== Dispute with Obiena ====
In late 2021, PATAFA, led by Juico, initiated a dispute with Filipino pole vaulter Ernest John Obiena involving the liquidation of finances related to the salary of Obiena's coach.

==== Ethics violations ====
The Obiena dispute led the Philippine Olympic Committee (POC) Ethics Committee to investigate Juico. The committee was presented evidence that Juico colluded to create untruthful statements, attempted confidentiality breaches and interfered with sponsorship discussions. These issues were considered unethical and violative of the provisions of the by-laws of the POC, specifically on uplifting the level of performance of Filipino athletes. The POC stated that Juico was given the opportunity to defend against accusations to his conduct but Juico declined due process. Based on the committee's recommendations, the POC board declared Juico as persona non grata for his role in the harassment of the athlete. Juico responded that the POC had no jurisdiction over NSAs. The POC clarified its legal prerogative to declare anybody persona non grata and that PATAFA was not penalized, nor was Juico removed, suspended or reprimanded. The POC's ethics committee concluded that Juico had harassed the athlete by making "malicious public accusations".

The POC general assembly voted on January 26, to enforce the decision of declaring Juico persona non grata following the official's row with pole vault star EJ Obiena. Thirty-six members of the POC general assembly, including Olympic gold medalist Hidilyn Diaz and former Olympic swimmer Jessie Lacuna, voted in favor of the decision.

== Personal life ==
Juico married Margarita Penson in 1973. They had four children, including their youngest, incumbent Quezon City 1st District councilor Mayen Juico.

=== Illness and death ===
Juico had cancer in his later years. His health began to deteriorate in 2017. This culminated with a kidney transplant and getting diagnosed with prostate and nose cancer. He died from cancer at the Makati Medical Center, on October 31, 2026, at the age of 78.
