= Philippine Athletics Track and Field Association =

Philippine sports governing body

- Sport: Athletics
- Jurisdiction: Philippines
- Abbreviation: PATAFA
- Founded: 1962
- Affiliation: World Athletics
- Regional affiliation: Asian Athletics
- President: Terry Capistrano
- Secretary: Edward Kho

Official website
- www.philippineathletics.org
- (Philippines)

Philippine Athletics, officially known in full as the Philippine Athletics Track and Field Association (PATAFA), is the national governing body for the sport of athletics sports such as track and field, road running, cross country running, and racewalking in the Philippines, including the core athletics sports which constitute the Decathlon in the Olympic Games.

It organizes the annual Philippine Athletics Championships, and is a member of the Asian Athletics and the World Athletics.

== Background ==
Jose C. Sering served as president from 1969 to 1981 and from 1984 to 1991. He resigned from his PATAFA post in 1990.

Go Teng Kok served as president from 1990 to 2014. Then known as “GTK's Army,” Filipino track and field athletes won six gold medals in the 2013 Indonesia Southeast Asian Games, the most by any team in the games.

Philip Ella Juico was elected president of PATAFA in November 2014 and in a second election held on March 25, 2015, with POC Vice President Joey Romasanta as observer.

In 2015 the Philippine Olympic Committee (POC) formally recognized the NSA after PATAFA met compliance with several requirements such as an updated constitution, by-laws and inclusion of the true stakeholders of the sport.

Juico was re-elected as president of PATAFA in November 2021. He resigned on June 18, 2022, due to the dispute with pole vaulter EJ Obiena, and was replaced by Terry Capistrano.

PATAFA was formerly known as the Philippine Amateur Track and Field Association, or simply Athletics Philippines.

== Board ==
As of August 2022, PATAFA's board consists of the president and seventeen members.

- President Terry Capistrano
- Chairman Rufus Rodriguez, congressman of the second district of Cagayan de Oro
- Honorary Chairman Senator Christopher Lawrence “Bong” Go
- Secretary-General Edward Kho, Assistant Professor University of the Philippines College of Human Kinetics
- Executive Vice President Agapito Capistrano
- Corporate Secretary Atty. Melinda Diaz-Salcedo, Director Philippine Superliga, Inc.
- Treasurer Noel Silva, Engineer
- Auditor Elmer Ngo
- Trustee Dr. Benjamin Espiritu, former Oriental Mindoro governor
- Trustee Felix O. Tiukinhoy Jr., Cebu businessman
- Trustee Josemarie Diaz, Ilagan City Mayor
- Trustee Rafaelito Villavicencio, sportsman
- Trustee Joseph Anton Bengzon
- Trustee Jaime Villegas
- Trustee Datu Yusoph Mama
- Trustee Dr. Guillermo Torres Jr.
- Trustee Atty. Roberto Uy
- Trustee Go Teng Kok, former PATAFA president

== See also ==
- Ernest John Obiena–PATAFA dispute
