= 2019 European Athletics U23 Championships – Men's pole vault =

The men's pole vault event at the 2019 European Athletics U23 Championships was held in Gävle, Sweden, at Gavlehof Stadium Park on 11 and 13 July.

== Medalists ==
Gold	Silver	Bronze
Bo Kanda Lita Baehre; Germany	Emmanouil Karalis; Greece	Thibaut Collet; France

== Results ==
=== Qualification ===
Qualification rule: 5.45 (Q) or the 12 best results (q) qualified for the final.

Rank	Group	Name	Nationality	4.90	5.05	5.20	Results	Notes
1	A	Adam Hague	Great Britain	–	o	o	5.20	q
1	A	Joel Leon Benitez	Great Britain	–	–	o	5.20	q
1	A	Robin Nool	Estonia	–	o	o	5.20	q
1	A	Matěj Ščerba	Czech Republic	o	o	o	5.20	q
1	B	Vincent Hobbie	Germany	–	o	o	5.20	q
1	B	Emmanouil Karalis	Greece	–	–	o	5.20	q
1	B	Urho Kujanpää	Finland	–	o	o	5.20	q
8	A	Pierre Cottin	France	–	–	xo	5.20	q
8	A	Sondre Guttormsen	Norway	–	–	xo	5.20	q
8	A	Bo Kanda Lita Baehre	Germany	–	–	xo	5.20	q
8	B	Thibaut Collet	France	–	–	xo	5.20	q
8	B	Charlie Myers	Great Britain	–	–	xo	5.20	q
13	A	Dario Prekl	Croatia	–	o	xxx	5.05	
13	B	Eetu Turakainen	Finland	o	o	xxx	5.05	
13	B	Dan Bárta	Czech Republic	o	o	xxx	5.05	
16	B	Sean Roth	Ireland	xo	o	xxx	5.05	
17	A	Mikko Paavola	Finland	xo	xo	xxr	5.05	
17	B	David Holý	Czech Republic	xo	xo	xxx	5.05	
19	B	İlkay Aydemir	Turkey	xxo	xxx		4.90	
	A	Dániel Böndör	Hungary	xxx			NM	
	A	Matteo Cristoforo Capello	Italy	–	xxx		NM	
	A	Romain Gavillon	France	–	xxx		NM	
	A	Ersu Şaşma	Turkey	–	–	xxx	NM	
	B	Isidro Leyva	Spain	xxx			NM	
	B	Max Mandusic	Italy	–	xxx		NM	
	B	Taras Shevtsov	Ukraine	xxx			NM	

=== Final ===
Rank	Name	Nationality	5.10	5.30	5.40	5.50	5.60	5.65	5.70	5.77	Result	Notes
1st place, gold medalist(s)	Bo Kanda Lita Baehre	Germany	–	o	o	o	o	xo	–	xr	5.65	
2nd place, silver medalist(s)	Emmanouil Karalis	Greece	–	–	xo	x–	o	xx–	x		5.60	
3rd place, bronze medalist(s)	Thibaut Collet	France	–	xo	xo	xxo	xo	xx–	x		5.60	
4	Sondre Guttormsen	Norway	–	o	–	o	xx–	x			5.50	
5	Charlie Myers	Great Britain	–	o	xo	o	xx–	x			5.50	
6	Joel Leon Benitez	Great Britain	o	o	o	xo	xx–	x			5.50	
7	Adam Hague	Great Britain	xo	xo	o	xo	xx–	x			5.50	
8	Robin Nool	Estonia	xo	o	o	xxx					5.40	PB
9	Urho Kujanpää	Finland	o	xo	xxx						5.30	
10	Pierre Cottin	France	–	xxo	–	xxx					5.30	
11	Vincent Hobbie	Germany	xo	xxx							5.10	
12	Matěj Ščerba	Czech Republic	xxo	xxx							5.10	
