= 2016 IAAF World U20 Championships – Men's pole vault =

The men's pole vault event at the 2016 IAAF World U20 Championships was held at Zdzisław Krzyszkowiak Stadium on 21 and 23 July.

== Medalists ==
Gold	Deakin Volz; United States
Silver	Kurtis Marschall; Australia
Bronze	Armand Duplantis; Sweden

== Records ==
Standing records prior to the 2016 IAAF World U20 Championships in Athletics
World Junior Record	Maksim Tarasov (URS)	5.80	Bryansk, Soviet Union	14 July 1989
World Junior Record	Raphael Holzdeppe (GER)	5.80	Biberach an der Riss, Germany	28 June 2008
Championship Record	Germán Chiaraviglio (ARG)	5.71	Beijing, China	19 August 2006
World Junior Leading	Kurtis Marschall (AUS)	5.70	Mannheim, Germany	26 June 2016

== Results ==
=== Qualification ===
Qualification: 5.35 (Q) or at least 12 best performers (q) qualified for the final.

Rank	Group	Name	Nationality	4.80	4.95	5.10	5.20	5.30	Result	Note
1	A	Kurtis Marschall	Australia	–	–	o	–	o	5.30	q
2	A	Muntadher Falih Abdulwahid	Iraq	–	–	o	o	–	5.20	q
2	A	Adam Hague	Great Britain	–	–	o	o	–	5.20	q
2	B	Armand Duplantis	Sweden	–	–	o	o	–	5.20	q
2	B	Christopher Nilsen	United States	–	o	o	o	–	5.20	q
6	A	Vladyslav Malykhin	Ukraine	–	xo	o	o	–	5.20	q
6	A	Koen van der Wijst	Netherlands	o	xo	o	o	–	5.20	q
8	B	Masaki Ejima	Japan	–	o	xxo	o	–	5.20	q
9	A	Matteo Cristoforo Capello	Italy	–	o	o	xo	–	5.20	q
10	A	Deakin Volz	United States	–	o	xo	xo	–	5.20	q
10	B	Tommi Holttinen	Finland	–	–	xo	xo	–	5.20	q
12	A	Urho Kujanpää	Finland	–	xxo	o	xo	–	5.20	q
12	B	Sander Moldau	Estonia	xo	o	xo	xo	–	5.20	q, PB
14	B	Emmanouil Karalis	Greece	–	–	o	xxo	–	5.20	q
15	A	Nikolaos Nerantzis	Greece	–	o	o	xxx		5.10	
15	B	Hussain Asim Al-Hizam	Saudi Arabia	–	o	o	xxx		5.10	
15	B	Angus Armstrong	Australia	–	–	o	xxx		5.10	
16	A	Robin Nool	Estonia	xo	o	o	xxx		5.10	
16	B	Charlie Myers	Great Britain	–	xo	o	xxx		5.10	
18	A	Keisuke Okubo	Japan	xxo	xxo	xo	xxx		5.10	
19	A	Pierre Cottin	France	–	o	–	xxx		4.95	
19	B	Patsapong Amsam-Ang	Thailand	o	o	–	xxx		4.95	
21	B	Danijel Buhin	Croatia	o	xxo	–	xxx		4.95	
22	A	Tristan Slater	Canada	xo	xxx				4.80	
22	B	Ali Moshin Alateej	Iraq	xo	xxx				4.80	
22	B	Gauvain Guillon-Romarin	France	xo	xxx				4.80	
	A	Matěj Ščerba	Czech Republic	xxx					NM	
	B	Francesco Lama	Italy	xxx					NM	

=== Final ===
Rank	Name	Nationality	5.00	5.10	5.20	5.30	5.35	5.40	5.45	5.50	5.55	5.60	5.65	Result	Note
1st place, gold medalist(s)	Deakin Volz	United States	o	xo	–	o	–	o	–	xo	x–	xo	o	5.65	
2nd place, silver medalist(s)	Kurtis Marschall	Australia	–	o	–	xo	–	–	o	–	o	xxx		5.55	
3rd place, bronze medalist(s)	Armand Duplantis	Sweden	–	–	o	–	o	–	xxo	xx–	x			5.45	
4	Emmanouil Karalis	Greece	–	o	–	xxo	–	o	–	xx–	x			5.40	
5	Adam Hague	Great Britain	–	o	xo	o	o	xo	xxx					5.40	
6	Masaki Ejima	Japan	xxo	xo	xo	xo	o	–	xx–	x				5.35	
7	Christopher Nilsen	United States	–	xo	o	–	xo	–	xxx					5.35	
8	Muntadher Falih Abdulwahid	Iraq	–	o	–	o	–	xx–	x					5.30	
8	Vladyslav Malykhin	Ukraine	–	o	–	o	–	xxx						5.30	
10	Matteo Cristoforo Capello	Italy	o	–	xo	o	–	xxx						5.30	PB
11	Tommi Holttinen	Finland	o	–	xo	xo	–	xxx						5.30	PB
12	Sander Moldau	Estonia	o	o	o	xxx								5.20	PB
13	Koen van der Wijst	Netherlands	o	xxo	xo	xxx								5.20	
14	Urho Kujanpää	Finland	xo	xxx										5.00	
