= 2024 European Athletics Championships – Men's pole vault =

Men's pole vault at the 2024 European Athletics Championships
- Venue: Stadio Olimpico
- Location: Rome
- Dates: 10 June (qualification); 12 June (final)
- Competitors: 30 from 17 nations
- Winning time: 6.10 CR

Medalists
gold medal	Armand Duplantis	Sweden
silver medal	Emmanouil Karalis	Greece
bronze medal	Ersu Şaşma	Turkey
bronze medal	Oleg Zernikel	Germany

The men's pole vault at the 2024 European Athletics Championships took place at the Stadio Olimpico on 10 and 12 June.

== Records ==
Standing records prior to the 2024 European Athletics Championships
World record	Armand Duplantis (SWE)	6.24 m	Xiamen, China	20 April 2024
European record	Armand Duplantis (SWE)	6.24 m	Xiamen, China	20 April 2024
Championship record	Armand Duplantis (SWE)	6.06 m	Munich, Germany	20 August 2022
World Leading	Armand Duplantis (SWE)	6.24 m	Xiamen, China	20 April 2024
Europe Leading	Armand Duplantis (SWE)	6.24 m	Xiamen, China	20 April 2024

== Schedule ==
Date	Time	Round
10 June 2024	10:18	Qualification
12 June 2024	20:20	Final

All times are local times (UTC+2)

== Results ==
=== Qualification ===
Qualification: 5.75 m (Q) or best 12 performances (q).

Rank	Group	Name	Nationality	5.25	5.45	5.60	5.79	5.75	Result	Notes
1	A	Oleg Zernikel	Germany	–	o	o			5.60	q
1	A	Armand Duplantis	Sweden	–	–	o			5.60	q
1	B	Torben Blech	Germany	–	o	o			5.60	q
1	B	Ben Broeders	Belgium	–	o	o			5.60	q
1	B	David Holý	Czech Republic	o	o	o			5.60	q
6	B	Robin Emig	France	o	xo	o			5.60	q
6	B	Piotr Lisek	Poland	–	xo	o			5.60	q
6	A	Ersu Şaşma	Turkey	–	xo	o			5.60	q
9	A	Thibaut Collet	France	–	xxo	o			5.60	q
9	A	Emmanouil Karalis	Greece	–	xxo	o			5.60	q
11	A	Matej Ščerba	Czech Republic	xxo	xxo	xo			5.60	q
12	A	Baptiste Thiery	France	o	o	xxo			5.60	q
13	B	Menno Vloon	Netherlands	–	xo	xxo			5.60	q
14	A	Pedro Buaró	Portugal	o	o	xxx			5.45	
14	B	Valters Kreišs	Latvia	o	o	xxx			5.45	
14	A	Bo Kanda Lita Baehre	Germany	–	o	xxx			5.45	
17	A	Simen Guttormsen	Norway	xo	o	xxx			5.45	
18	B	Tommi Holttinen	Finland	o	xo	xxx			5.45	
19	B	Urho Kujanpää	Finland	o	xxo	xxx			5.45	
19	B	Vladislav Malykhin	Ukraine	o	xxo	xxx			5.45	
21	B	Simone Bertelli	Italy	o	xxx				5.25	
21	B	Paweł Wojciechowski	Poland	o	xxx				5.25	
21	B	Dominik Alberto	Switzerland	o	xxx				5.25	
24	A	Illia Kravchenko	Ukraine	xo	xxx				5.25	
24	A	Juho Alasaari	Finland	xo	xxx				5.25	
26	A	Claudio Stecchi	Italy	xxo	xxx				5.25	
	B	Ioannis Rizos	Greece	xxx					NM	
	A	Robert Sobera	Poland	–	xxx				NM	
	A	Ivan Horvat	Croatia	xxx					NM	
	B	Pål Haugen Lillefosse	Norway						DNS	

=== Final ===
Rank	Name	Nationality	5.35	5.50	5.65	5.75	5.82	5.87	5.92	5.97	6.02	6.10	6.25	Result	Notes
1st place, gold medalist(s)	Armand Duplantis	Sweden	-	-	o	-	o	-	o	o	-	o	xxx	6.10	CR
2nd place, silver medalist(s)	Emmanouil Karalis	Greece	-	o	o	o	xo	o	x-	x-	x			5.87	PB
3rd place, bronze medalist(s)	Ersu Şaşma	Turkey	-	o	o	o	xo	xxx						5.82	=SB
3rd place, bronze medalist(s)	Oleg Zernikel	Germany	-	o	o	o	xo	xxx						5.82	SB
5	Thibaut Collet	France	-	xo	xo	o	xo	xxx						5.82	
6	Piotr Lisek	Poland	-	xo	o	o	xxx							5.75	
6	Torben Blech	Germany	-	o	xo	o	xxx							5.75	
8	Menno Vloon	Netherlands	-	xo	o	xxo	xxx							5.75	
9	Baptiste Thiery	France	o	xo	xxo	xxo	xxx							5.75	=PB
10	Matej Ščerba	Czech Republic	o	o	xo	xxx								5.65	
11	Robin Emig	France	o	xxo	xxo	xxx								5.65	
12	David Holý	Czech Republic	o	o	xxx									5.50	
13	Ben Broeders	Belgium	-	xo	xxx									5.50	
