= 2026 World Athletics Ultimate Championship – Men's pole vault =

Men's pole vault at the 2026 World Athletics Ultimate Championship
- Venue: National Athletics Centre
- Location: Budapest, Hungary
- Dates: 11 September 2026 (final)
- Competitors: 8 from 6 nations
- Winning time: 6.20 m

Champion
- Armand Duplantis; Sweden

The men's pole vault was held as a straight final at the 2026 World Athletics Ultimate Championship at the National Athletics Centre in Budapest, Hungary on 11 September 2026. It was the first time the World Ultimate Championship is held. Athletes qualified by wildcard or by their world ranking.

== Background ==
Global records before the 2026 World Athletics Ultimate Championship
Record	Height	Athlete (nation)	Location	Date
World record	6.31 m i	Armand Duplantis (SWE)	Uppsala, Sweden	12 March 2026
World lead	6.31 m i	Armand Duplantis (SWE)	Uppsala, Sweden	12 March 2026

Area records before the 2026 World Athletics Ultimate Championship
Record	Height	Athlete (nation)	Location	Date
African record	6.03 m	Okkert Brits (RSA)	Cologne, Germany	18 August 1995
Asian record	6.00 m	Ernest John Obiena (PHI)	Bergen, Norway	10 June 2023
Asian record	6.00 m	Ernest John Obiena (PHI)	Budapest, Hungary	26 August 2023
European record	6.31 m i	Armand Duplantis (SWE)	Uppsala, Sweden	12 March 2026
North, Central American, and Caribbean record	6.07 m	KC Lightfoot (USA)	Nashville, United States	2 June 2023
Oceanian record	6.06 m i	Steven Hooker (AUS)	Boston, United States	7 February 2009
South American record	6.03 m	Thiago Braz (BRA)	Rio de Janeiro, Brazil	15 August 2016

== Qualification ==
For the pole vault, eight athletes qualified, up to three by wildcard for winners of the event at the 2024 Summer Olympic, the 2025 World Athletics Championships, or the 2026 Diamond League final and the others by their position at the World Athletics Rankings for the event on 3 September 2026.

== Results ==
=== Final ===
The final was held on 12 September at 18:18 (UTC+2).

Place	Athlete	Nation	5.60	5.80	5.95	6.05	6.15	6.20	6.25	6.32	Result	Notes
1st place, gold medalist(s)	Armand Duplantis	Sweden	o	-	o	o	o	o	-	xxx	6.20 m	
2	Emmanouil Karalis	Greece	o	o	o	xxo	o	x-	xx		6.15 m	
3	Sondre Guttormsen	Norway	o	o	o	xxx					5.95 m	
4	Kurtis Marschall	Australia	o	x-	xo	xxx					5.95 m	
5	Zachery Bradford	United States	xo	xo	xo	xxx					5.95 m	
6	Baptiste Thiery	France	o	o	xxx						5.80 m	
6	Sam Kendricks	United States	o	o	xxx						5.80 m	
8	Christopher Nilsen	United States	o	xo	xxx						5.80 m	
