= 2025 European Athletics Indoor Championships – Men's pole vault =

Men's pole vault at the 2025 European Athletics Indoor Championships
- Venue: Omnisport Apeldoorn
- Location: Apeldoorn, Netherlands
- Dates: 7 March 2025 (qualification); 9 March 2025 (final)
- Competitors: 18 from 11 nations
- Winning mark: 5.90

Medalists
| gold medal | Emmanouil Karalis | Greece |
| gold medal | Menno Vloon | Netherlands |
| bronze medal | Sondre Guttormsen | Norway |

The men's pole vault at the 2025 European Athletics Indoor Championships was held on the short track of Omnisport in Apeldoorn, Netherlands, on 7 and 9 March 2025. This was the 15th time the event is contested at the European Athletics Indoor Championships. Athletes can qualify by achieving the entry standard or by their World Athletics Ranking in the event.

The qualifying round was scheduled for 7 March during the evening session. The final was scheduled for 9 March during the evening session.

== Background ==
The men's pole vault was contested 37 times before 2025, held every time since the first edition of the European Athletics Indoor Championships (1970–2023). The 2025 European Athletics Indoor Championships will be held in Omnisport Apeldoorn in Apeldoorn, Netherlands. The removable indoor athletics track was retopped for these championships in September 2024.

Armand Duplantis is the world and European record holder, with a height of 6.27 m, set in 2025. Duplantis also holds the championship record of 6.05 m, set at the 2021 championships.

Records before the 2025 European Athletics Indoor Championships
| Record | Athlete (nation) | Height (m) | Location | Date |
|---|---|---|---|---|
| World record | Armand Duplantis (SWE) | 6.27 | Clermont-Ferrand, France | 28 February 2025 |
| European record | Armand Duplantis (SWE) | 6.27 | Clermont-Ferrand, France | 28 February 2025 |
| Championship record | Armand Duplantis (SWE) | 6.05 | Toruń, Poland | 7 March 2021 |
| World leading | Armand Duplantis (SWE) | 6.27 | Clermont-Ferrand, France | 28 February 2025 |
| European leading | Armand Duplantis (SWE) | 6.27 | Clermont-Ferrand, France | 28 February 2025 |

== Qualification ==
For the men's pole vault, the qualification period runs from 25 February 2024 until 23 February 2025. Athletes can qualify by achieving the entry standards of 5.85 m or by virtue of their World Athletics Ranking for the event. There is a target number of 18 athletes.

== Rounds ==
=== Qualification ===
The qualifying round was held on 7 March, starting at 19:05 (UTC+1) in the evening.

Results of the qualification round
| Rank | Athlete | Nation | 5.25 | 5.45 | 5.65 | 5.75 | Result | Notes | PB |
|---|---|---|---|---|---|---|---|---|---|
| 1 | Thibaut Collet | France | – | o | o | o | 5.75 | q | 5.95 |
| 1 | Emmanouil Karalis | Greece | – | – | o | o | 5.75 | q | 6.02 |
| 1 | Menno Vloon | Netherlands | – | o | o | o | 5.75 | q | 5.96 |
| 4 | David Holý | Czech Republic | o | o | xo | o | 5.75 | q, PB | 5.71 |
| 5 | Valters Kreišs | Latvia | – | o | o | xo | 5.75 | q | 5.82 |
| 5 | Baptiste Thiery | France | – | o | o | xo | 5.75 | q | 5.80 |
| 7 | Oleg Zernikel | Germany | – | o | xxo | xxo | 5.75 | q, SB | 5.87 |
| 8 | Ben Broeders | Belgium | – | o | o | xxr | 5.65 | q | 5.85 |
| 8 | Sondre Guttormsen | Norway | – | o | o | xxx | 5.65 | q | 6.00 |
| 8 | Renaud Lavillenie | France | – | o | o | xxx | 5.65 | q | 6.16 |
| 8 | Bo Kanda Lita Baehre | Germany | – | o | o | xxx | 5.65 | q | 5.90 |
| 12 | Torben Blech | Germany | – | o | xo | xxx | 5.65 | | 5.86 |
| 13 | Piotr Lisek | Poland | – | o | xxo | xxx | 5.65 | | 6.02 |
| 14 | Matěj Ščerba | Czech Republic | xxo | o | xxx | | 5.45 | | 5.67 |
| 15 | Robert Sobera | Poland | o | xo | xxx | | 5.45 | | 5.81 |
| 15 | Ioannis Rizos | Greece | o | xo | xxx | | 5.45 | | 5.62 |
| 17 | Urho Kujanpää | Finland | xo | xxx | | | 5.25 | | 5.70 |
| | Ersu Şaşma | Turkey | – | xxx | | | NM | | 5.90 |

=== Final ===
The final was held on 9 March, starting at 16:42 (UTC+1) in the afternoon.

Result of the final
| Rank | Athlete | Nation | 5.45 | 5.60 | 5.70 | 5.80 | 5.85 | 5.90 | 5.95 | 6.00 | Result | Notes |
|---|---|---|---|---|---|---|---|---|---|---|---|---|
| 1st place, gold medalist(s) | Emmanouil Karalis | Greece | – | o | – | o | xxo | o | xxx | | 5.90 | |
| 1st place, gold medalist(s) | Menno Vloon | Netherlands | o | o | xxo | o | o | o | xxx | | 5.90 | SB |
| 3rd place, bronze medalist(s) | Sondre Guttormsen | Norway | o | – | xxo | – | xx– | o | – | xxr | 5.90 | SB |
| 4 | Thibaut Collet | France | – | o | o | xo | o | x– | xx | | 5.85 | |
| 5 | Ben Broeders | Belgium | o | – | o | – | xxx | | | | 5.70 | |
| 6 | Valters Kreišs | Latvia | o | xo | o | xx– | x | | | | 5.70 | |
| 7 | Bo Kanda Lita Baehre | Germany | o | xx– | o | xxx | | | | | 5.70 | |
| 8 | David Holý | Czech Republic | o | o | xo | xxx | | | | | 5.70 | |
| 9 | Oleg Zernikel | Germany | xo | o | xx– | x | | | | | 5.60 | |
| 9 | Baptiste Thiery | France | xo | o | xxx | | | | | | 5.60 | |
| 11 | Renaud Lavillenie | France | – | xo | – | xxx | | | | | 5.60 | |
