= 2026 World Athletics Indoor Championships – Men's pole vault =

Men's pole vault at the 2026 World Athletics Indoor Championships
- Venue: Kujawsko-Pomorska Arena Toruń
- Location: Toruń, Poland
- Dates: 21 March
- Winning height: 6.25 m CR

Medalists
gold medal	Armand Duplantis	Sweden
silver medal	Emmanouil Karalis	Greece
bronze medal	Kurtis Marschall	Australia

The men's pole vault at the 2026 World Athletics Indoor Championships took place on the short track of the Kujawsko-Pomorska Arena Toruń in Toruń, Poland, on 21 March 2026. This was the 22nd time the event was contested at the World Athletics Indoor Championships. Athletes could qualify by achieving the entry standard or by their World Athletics Ranking in the event.

== Background ==
The men's pole vault was contested 21 times before 2026, at every previous edition of the World Athletics Indoor Championships.

Records before the 2026 World Athletics Indoor Championships
Record	Athlete (nation)	Height (m)	Location	Date
World record	Armand Duplantis (SWE)	6.31	Uppsala, Sweden	12 March 2026
2026 World Lead	Armand Duplantis (SWE)	6.31	Uppsala, Sweden	12 March 2026
Championship record	Armand Duplantis (SWE)	6.20	Belgrade, Serbia	20 March 2022

== Qualification ==
For the men's pole vault, the qualification period ran from 1 November 2025 until 8 March 2026. Athletes could qualify by achieving the entry standard of 5.90 m. Athletes could also qualify by virtue of their World Athletics Ranking for the event or by virtue of their World Athletics Indoor Tour wildcard. There is a target number of 12 athletes.

== Results ==
=== Final ===
The final was held on 21 March, starting at 18:25 (UTC+1) in the evening.

Place	Athlete	Nation	5.50	5.70	5.85	5.95	6.00	6.05	6.10	6.15	6.20	6.25	Result	Notes
1st place, gold medalist(s)	Armand Duplantis	Sweden	o	–	o	–	o	–	o	o	–	o	6.25	CR
2nd place, silver medalist(s)	Emmanouil Karalis	Greece	–	o	o	o	xo	o	–	–	x–	xx	6.05	
3rd place, bronze medalist(s)	Kurtis Marschall	Australia	o	o	o	x–	o	xxx					6.00	PB
4	Sondre Guttormsen	Norway	o	xo	xxo	o	–	xxx					5.95	
5	Zach Bradford	United States	o	xo	xo	xo	xxx						5.95	
6	Baptiste Thiery	France	–	xo	o	x–	xx						5.85	
7	Menno Vloon	Netherlands	o	o	xo	x–	xx						5.85	SB
8	Thibaut Collet	France	–	xo	xo	xx–	x						5.85	SB
9	Chris Nilsen	United States	o	o	xxx								5.70	
9	EJ Obiena	Philippines	o	o	xxx								5.70	
11	Simen Guttormsen	Norway	xo	o	xxx								5.70	
12	David Holý	Czech Republic	o	xxx									5.50	
