= Emmanouil Karalis =

Greek pole vaulter (born 1999)

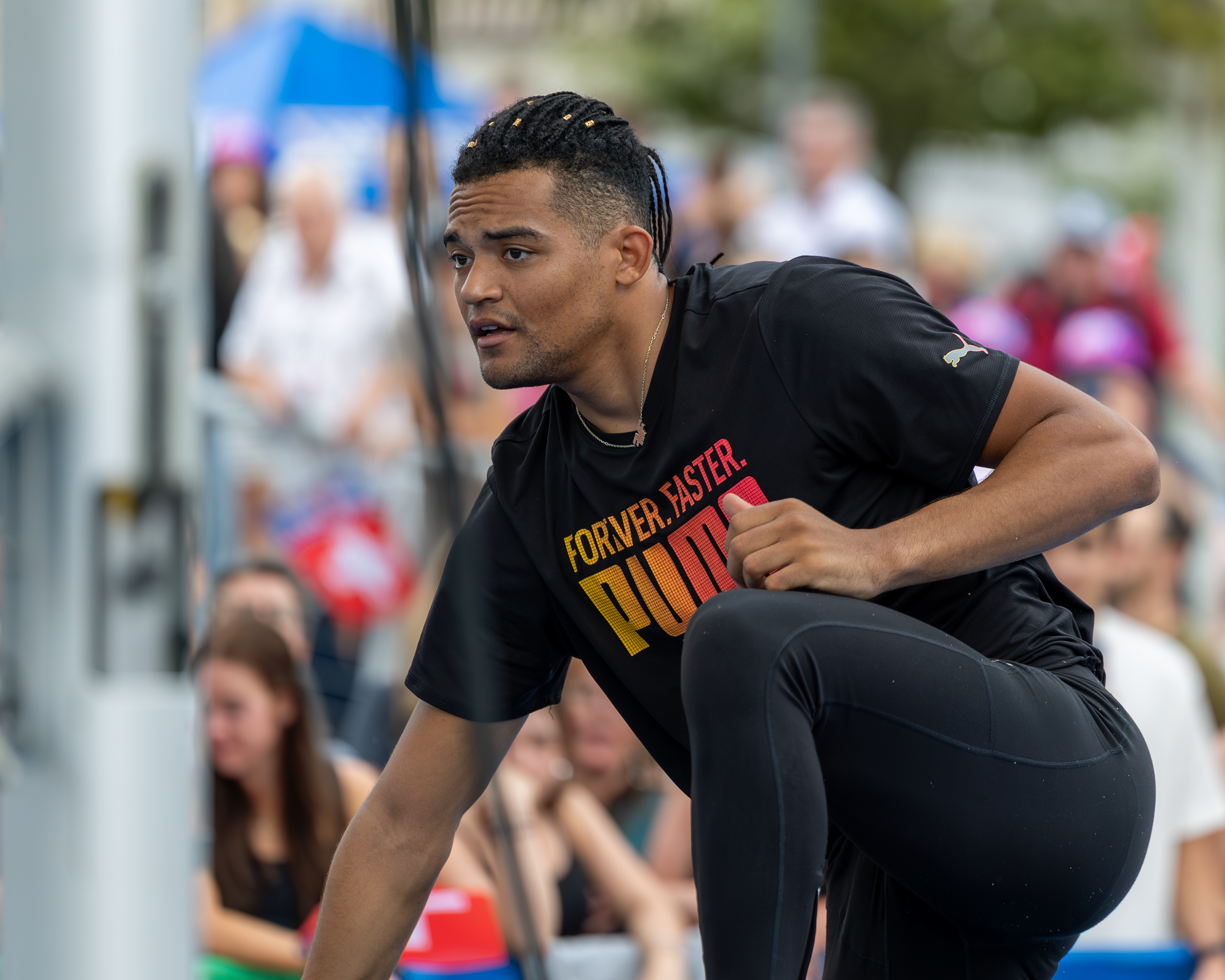
- Karalis in 2026

Personal information
- Full name: Emmanouil Karalis
- Nickname: Manolo
- Born: 20 October 1999 (age 27) Athens, Greece
- Height: 1.86 m (6 ft 1 in)
- Weight: 80 kg (176 lb)

Sport
- Country: Greece
- Sport: Track and field
- Event: Pole vault
- Club: Olympiacos CFP
- Coached by: Andreas Tsonis, Panagiotis Simeonidis, Vitaly Petrov, Charalambos Karalis, Marcin Szczepański

Achievements and titles
- Personal bests: Outdoor 6.20 m NR (Zurich 2026); Indoor 6.17 m NR (Paiania 2026)
Medal record
Men's athletics
Representing Greece
Event	1st	2nd	3rd
Olympic Games	0	0	1
World Championships	0	1	0
World Ultimate Championships	0	1	0
World Indoor Championships	0	2	1
Diamond League	1	2	0
European Championships	0	2	0
European Indoor Championships	1	1	0
European Games	0	1	0
Balkan Athletics Championships	3	0	0
European Athletics U23 Championships	0	2	0
Total	5	12	2
Men's athletics
Representing Greece
Olympic Games
Bronze medal – third place	2024 Paris	Pole vault
World Championships
Silver medal – second place	2025 Tokyo	Pole vault
World Ultimate Championship
Second place	2026 Budapest	Pole vault
World Indoor Championships
Silver medal – second place	2025 Nanjing	Pole vault
Silver medal – second place	2026 Toruń	Pole vault
Bronze medal – third place	2024 Glasgow	Pole vault
Diamond League
First place	2026	Pole vault
Second place	2024	Pole vault
Second place	2025	Pole vault
European Championships
Silver medal – second place	2024 Rome	Pole vault
Silver medal – second place	2026 Birmingham	Pole vault
European Indoor Championships
Gold medal – first place	2025 Apeldoorn	Pole vault
Silver medal – second place	2023 Istanbul	Pole vault
European Games
Silver medal – second place	2023 Kraków-Małopolska	Pole vault
Balkan Athletics Championships
Gold medal – first place	2019 Pramets	Pole vault
Gold medal – first place	2021 Smederevo	Pole vault
Gold medal – first place	2025 Volos	Pole vault
European U23 Championships
Silver medal – second place	2019 Gävle	Pole Vault
Silver medal – second place	2021 Tallinn	Pole Vault
World Youth Championships
Bronze medal – third place	2015 Cali	Pole Vault
European Youth Championships
Gold medal – first place	2016 Tbilisi	Pole Vault

Emmanouil "Manolo" Karalis (Greek: Εμμανουήλ "Μανόλο" Καραλής, born 20 October 1999) is a Greek pole vaulter. He holds the Greek outdoor and indoor records (6.20 m and 6.17 m respectively). In March 2025, Karalis became the first Greek pole vaulter to win a gold medal at a European Athletics Indoor Championship. He holds the second-highest pole vault PR of all athletes, after Armand Duplantis, and is next to him the only man to vault 6.20 m (20 ft 4 in).

== Career ==
Karalis won the silver medal at the 2019 and 2021 European Athletics U23 Championships, bronze medal at the 2024 Summer Olympics, and placed fourth at the 2020 Summer Olympics. At the 2025 European Athletics Indoor Championships, Karalis shared the gold medal with Menno Vloon. In 2025 he won the gold medal at the Balkan Athletics Championship.

Since October 2021, Karalis has been a member of the athletics department of Olympiacos CFP.

On 28 February 2026, Karalis jumped 6.17 meters at the Greek Indoor Championship, becoming the second highest vaulter in history.

== Personal life ==
He is the son of a Greek father Charalambos (Haris) from Pyrgos, a former decathlete, and a Ugandan mother Sarah, a former long jumper. He has a twin sister, named Angeliki, who competed in the heptathlon.

== Honours ==
Year	Competition	Venue	Position	Notes
Representing Greece
2015	World Youth Championships	Cali, Colombia	3rd	5.20 m
2016	European Youth Championships	Tbilisi, Georgia	1st	5.45 m
2016	World U20 Championships	Bydgoszcz, Poland	4th	5.40 m
2017	European Indoor Championships	Belgrade, Serbia	11th	5.50 m
2017	European U20 Championships	Grosseto, Italy	–	NM
2017	World Championships	London, United Kingdom	17th (q)	5.45 m
2018	World Indoor Championships	Birmingham, United Kingdom	5th	5.80 m PB
2019	European Indoor Championships	Glasgow, United Kingdom	4th	5.65 m
2019	European U23 Championships	Gävle, Sweden	2nd	5.60 m
2019	World Championships	Doha, Qatar	15th (q)	5.60 m
2021	European U23 Championships	Tallinn, Estonia	2nd	5.65 m
2021	Olympic Games	Tokyo, Japan	4th	5.80 m PB
2022	World Championships	Eugene, United States	22nd (q)	5.50 m
2022	European Championships	Munich, Germany	13th (q)	5.50 m
2023	European Indoor Championships	Istanbul, Turkey	2nd	5.80 m
2023	European Team Championships, Division 1	Chorzow, Poland	2nd	5.80 m
2023	World Championships	Budapest, Hungary	–	NM
2024	World Indoor Championships	Glasgow, United Kingdom	3rd	5.85 m SB
2024	European Championships	Rome, Italy	2nd	5.87 m PB
2024	Olympic Games	Paris, France	3rd	5.90 m
2025	European Indoor Championships	Apeldoorn, Netherlands	1st	5.90 m
2025	World Indoor Championships	Nanjing, China	2nd	6.05 m NR
2025	Balkan Championships	Volos, Greece	1st	5.92 m CR
2025	World Championships	Tokyo, Japan	2nd	6.00 m
2026	World Indoor Championships	Toruń, Poland	2nd	6.05 m
2026	European Championships	Birmingham, United Kingdom	2nd	6.00 m
2026	World Ultimate Championship	Budapest, Hungary	2nd	6.15 m

=== Circuit results ===
- Diamond League 2025
  Pole vault runner-up (2nd): 2025 (8 participations): Xiamen: 5.82m (2nd), Shanghai: 6.01m (2nd), Oslo: 5,82m (2nd), Stockholm: 5.60m (8th), Monaco: 5.92m (2nd), Chorzów Silesia: 6.00m (2nd), Lausane: 6.02 (1st), Zürich: 6.00m (2nd)
- Diamond League 2026
  Pole vault winner (1st): 2026 (9 participations): Shanghai: 5.70m (7th), Oslo: 5.62m (4th), Doha: 5.92m (1st), Paris: 5.83m (3rd), London: 5.95m (4th), Lausanne: 6.16m (2nd), Stockholm : 6.00m (3rd), Zurich: 6.20m (2nd), Brussels: 6.12m (1st)

== Progression ==
Performance	Venue	Date	Notes
6.20 m	Zurich, Switzerland	2026, 27 August	NR
6.16 m	Lausane, Switzerland	2026, 20 August	NR
6.17 m i	Paiania, Greece	2026, 28 February	NRi
6.07 m i	Paiania, Greece	2026, 28 February	NRi
6.08 m	Volos, Greece	2025, 2 August	NR
6.05 m i	Nanjing China	2025, 22 March	NRi
6.02 m i	Clermont-Ferrand, France	2025, 28 February	NRi
6.01 m i	Piraeus, Greece	2025, 22 February	NRi
5.95 m i	Piraeus, Greece	2025, 22 February	NRi
5.94 m i	Berlin, Germany	2025, 14 February	NRi
5.92 m i	Łódź, Poland	2025, 8 February	NRi
5.90 m i	Caen, France	2025, 31 January	NRi
6.00 m	Chorzów, Poland	2024, 25 August	NR
5.93 m	Volos, Greece	2024, 29 June	NR
5.92 m	Bydgoszcz, Poland	2024, 20 June	NR
5.87 m	Rome, Italy	2024, 12 June	
5.82 m	Jockgrim, Germany	2023, 4 August	
5.86 m i	Piraeus, Greece	2023, 18 February	NRi
5.83 m i	Karlsruhe, Germany	2023, 27 January	
5.81 m i	Uppsala, Sweden	2022, 10 February	
5.80 m	Tokyo, Japan	2021, 3 August	
5.80 m i	Birmingham, UK	2018, 4 March	
5.78 m i	Piraeus, Greece	2018, 12 February	WU23R
5.71 m i	Piraeus, Greece	2018, 12 February	
5.70 m i	Piraeus, Greece	2017, 19 February	
5.65 m i	Piraeus, Greece	2017, 19 February	
5.55 m i	Ostrava, Czechia	2016, 19 March	WU18R
5.54 m i	Jablonec nad Nisou, Czechia	2016, 5 March	WU18R
5.53 m i	Piraeus, Greece	2016, 14 February	WU18R
