= Ersu Şaşma =

Turkish pole vaulter (born 1999)

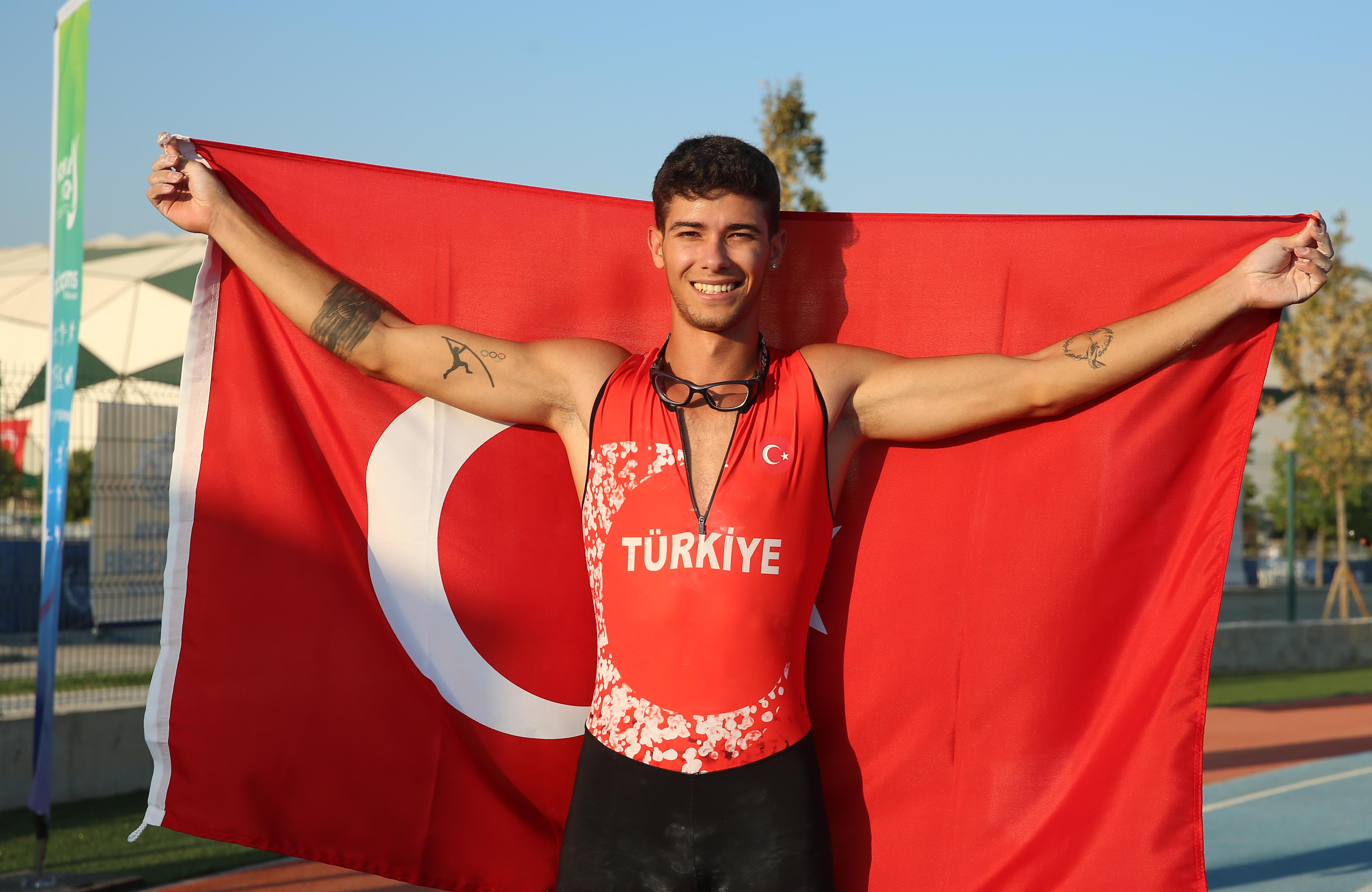

Personal information
- Nationality: Turkish
- Born: 30 September 1999 (age 27) Mersin, Turkey

Sport
- Sport: Athletics
- Event: Pole vault
- Club: Fenerbahçe Athletics

Achievements and titles
- Personal bests: 2018: 5.20 m (U20) NR, 2019: 5.41 m Indoor (U23) NR, 2025; 5.92 m NR, 2025: 5.90 m Indoor NR
Medal record
Men's athletics
Representing Turkey
European Championships
Bronze medal – third place	2024 Rome	Pole vault
Mediterranean Games
Gold medal – first place	2022 Oran	Pole vault
Silver medal – second place	2026 Taranto	Pole vault
Islamic Solidarity Games
Gold medal – first place	2021 Konya	Pole vault
European Team Championships
Gold medal – first place	2021 Cluj-Napoca	Pole vault
Silver medal – second place	2025 Maribor	Pole vault
Bronze medal – third place	2019 Sandnes	Pole vault
Balkan Championships
Gold medal – first place	2020 Istanbul	Indoor Pole vault
Gold medal – first place	2021 Istanbul	Indoor Pole vault
Silver medal – second place	2021 Smederevo	Pole vault
Bronze medal – third place	2018 Stara Zagora	Pole vault
European U23 Championships
Bronze medal – third place	2021 Tallinn	Pole vault

Ersu Şaşma (born 30 September 1999) is a Turkish pole vaulter.

== Personal life ==
Ersu Şaşma was born on 30 September 1999 in Mersin, southern Turkey.

== Sport career ==
He is a member of Fenerbahçe Athletics. He was coached by Halil İbrahim Çömlekçi who died in January 2021.

Şaşma improved his own record for juniors (U20) from 5.13 m to 5.20 m at the Olympic Trials Competition in Mersin in May 2018. He won the bronze medal at the 2018 Balkan Athletics Championships in Stara Zagora, Bulgaria.

At the First League of the 2019 European Athletics Team Championships in Sandnes, Norway, he took the bronze medal, and improved the national record in the Indoor U23 category about 1 cm to 5.41 m.

In 2020, Şaşma captured the gold medal at the Balkan Athletics Indoor Championships in Istanbul, Turkey.

He won his second gold medal at the Balkan Athletics Indoor Championships in Istanbul in 2021. He broke a new national record by jumping 5.80 m at the 3rd Orhan Altan Cup in Ankara by June 2021, and obtained so a quota for the 2020 Summer Olympics. In July, he won the bronze medal at the 2021 European Athletics U23 Championships with 5.60 m; the same mark as Sondre Guttormsen.

He took the silver medal in the pole vault event with 5.50 m at the 2025 European Athletics Team Championships Second Division in Maribor, Slovenia. He contributed to his team's record with 15 points.

In July 2025, Ersu Şaşma competed at the Internationales Stadionfest (ISTAF) in Berlin, Germany. He broke the Turkish national record in pole vault by clearing 5.92 metres, surpassing his previous record of 5.90 metres, and finished first in the event.

== Competition record ==
Year	Competition	Venue	Position	Notes
Representing Turkey
2016	European Youth Championships	Tbilisi, Georgia	14th (q)	4.55 m
2017	European U20 Championships	Grosseto, Italy	20th (q)	5.00 m
2018	World U20 Championships	Tampere, Finland	13th (q)	5.10 m
2018	Balkan Championships	Stara Zagora, Bulgaria	3rd	5.00 m
2019	European U23 Championships	Gävle, Sweden	–	NM
2019	European Team Championships 1st Division	Sandnes, Norway	3rd	5.41 m
2021	European Indoor Championships	Toruń, Poland	5th	5.70 m
2021	European Team Championships 1st Division	Cluj-Napoca, Romania	1st	5.65 m
2021	Balkan Championships	Smederevo, Serbia	2nd	5.50 m
2021	European U23 Championships	Tallinn, Estonia	3rd	5.60 m
2021	Olympic Games	Tokyo, Japan	10th	5.70 m
2022	Mediterranean Games	Oran, Algeria	1st	5.75 m
2022	World Championships	Eugene, United States	8th	5.80 m
2022	Islamic Solidarity Games	Konya, Turkey	1st	5.60 m
2022	European Championships	Munich, Germany	19th (q)	5.50 m
2023	European Indoor Championships	Istanbul, Turkey	11th (q)	5.55 m
2023	World Championships	Budapest, Hungary	12th	5.55 m
2024	World Indoor Championships	Glasgow, United Kingdom	10th	5.50 m
2024	European Championships	Rome, Italy	3rd	5.82 m
2024	Olympic Games	Paris, France	5th	5.85 m
2025	European Indoor Championships	Apeldoorn, Netherlands	–	NM
2025	World Indoor Championships	Nanjing, China	6th	5.80 m
2025	European Team Championships 2nd Division	Maribor, Slovenia	2nd	5.50 m
2025	World Championships	Tokyo, Japan	11th (q)	5.75 m^{1}
2026	European Championships	Birmingham, United Kingdom	–	NM
2026	Mediterranean Games	Taranto, Italy	2nd	5.70 m

^{1}No mark in the final
