= Kurtis Marschall =

Australian pole vaulter

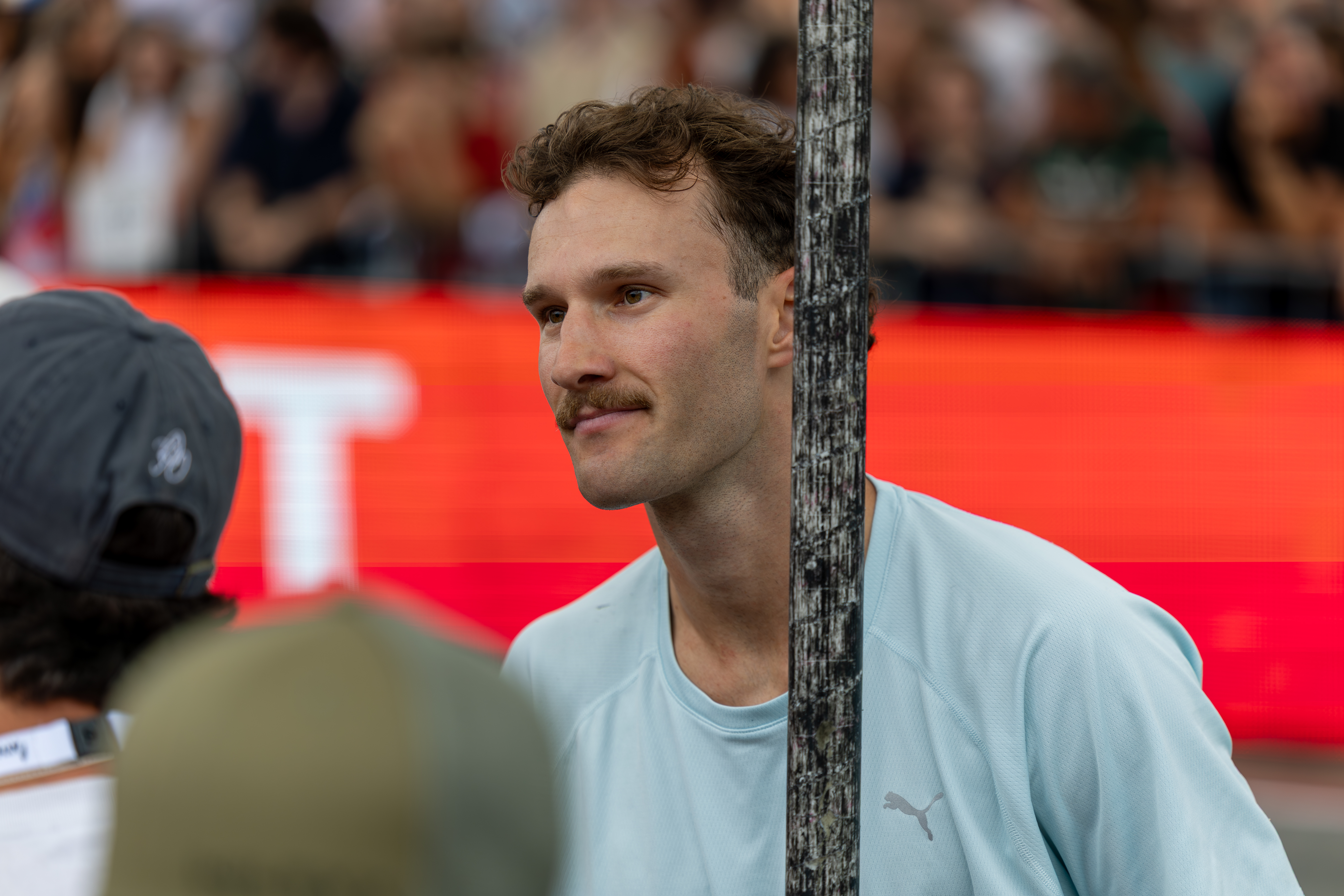
- Marschall in 2026

Personal information
- Nationality: Australian
- Born: 25 April 1997 (age 29) Adelaide, South Australia
- Height: 187 cm (6 ft 2 in)
- Weight: 78 kg (172 lb)

Sport
- Country: Australia
- Sport: Track and field athletics
- Event: Pole vault

Achievements and titles
- Personal bests: 6.00 m (Clermont-Ferrand, 2026)
Medal record
Men's athletics
Representing Australia
World Championships
Bronze medal – third place	2023 Budapest	Pole vault
Bronze medal – third place	2025 Tokyo	Pole vault
World Indoor Championships
Bronze medal – third place	2026 Toruń	Pole vault
Commonwealth Games
Gold medal – first place	2018 Gold Coast	Pole vault
Gold medal – first place	2022 Birmingham	Pole vault
Gold medal – first place	2026 Glasgow	Pole vault
World Athletics U20 Championships
Silver medal – second place	2016 Bydgoszcz	Pole vault

Kurtis Marschall (born 25 April 1997) is an Australian pole vaulter, bronze medalist at the 2023 and 2025 World Athletics Championships.

== Early years ==
Marschall was born on 25 April 1997 in North Adelaide, South Australia.

In 2008, as an 11-year-old, Marschall was inspired by Steve Hooker's gold medal win at the Olympic Games in Beijing. A year later he attended a ‘come-and-try' day in Adelaide where he jumped two metres.

Marschall started training with Alan Launder and 4 years later was clearing five metres. Launder died in 2014 and Kym Simons coached him for the next few years. Not long after, Marschall made his international debut at the World U20 Championships.

== Achievements ==
in 2016 in Germany, ahead of his second World U20 Championships appearance, Marschall cleared 5.70 m, locking up Olympic qualification. It was the highest vault by a junior in the world for three years. He then competed at the 2016 Summer Olympics in Rio de Janeiro, in the men's pole vault. He missed qualifying for the Olympic pole vault final on countback.

In 2017 he was 11th in the final at the World Championships. At the 2018 Gold Coast Commonwealth Games the following year he claimed gold for Australia. Marschall was now a 5.86m vaulter and top-5 in the Diamond Leagues.

He qualified for the 2020 Tokyo Olympics. In his men's pole vault group he came 2nd with a leap of 5.75m which qualified him for the final. In the final he did not register a clearance after dislodging the bar with all three attempts at his opening height of 5.55m.

At the 2022 Commonwealth Games he claimed gold for Australia with a winning jump of 5.70 metres.

His personal best in the event is 6.00 metres, set at the 2026 edition of the All Star Perche. This jump made him the fourth Australian to clear the six metre mark. Later in 2026 Marschall was the first person in three years to beat Armand Duplantis when he won Diamond League in Stockholm.

== International competitions ==
Year	Competition	Venue	Position	Notes
Representing Australia
2014	World Junior Championships	Eugene, United States	10th (q)	5.00 m
2016	World U20 Championships	Bydgoszcz, Poland	2nd	5.55 m
2016	Olympic Games	Rio de Janeiro, Brazil	15th (q)	5.60 m
2017	World Championships	London, United Kingdom	7th	5.65 m
2018	World Indoor Championships	Birmingham, United Kingdom	4th	5.80 m
2018	Commonwealth Games	Gold Coast, Australia	1st	5.70 m
2021	Olympic Games	Tokyo, Japan	5th (q)	5.75 m^{1}
2022	World Indoor Championships	Belgrade, Serbia	7th	5.75 m
2022	World Championships	Eugene, United States	24th (q)	5.50 m
2023	World Championships	Budapest, Hungary	3rd	5.95 m
2024	World Indoor Championships	Glasgow, United Kingdom	5th	5.75 m
2024	Olympic Games	Paris, France	6th	5.85 m
2025	World Indoor Championships	Nanjing, China	5th	5.80 m
2025	World Championships	Tokyo, Japan	3rd	5.95 m
2026	World Indoor Championships	Toruń, Poland	3rd	6.00 m
2026	Commonwealth Games	Glasgow, United Kingdom	1st	5.85 m
2026	World Ultimate Championship	Budapest, Hungary	4th	5.95 m

^{1}No mark in the final
