= Athletics at the 2024 Summer Olympics – Men's pole vault =

Men's pole vault at the Games of the XXXIII Olympiad
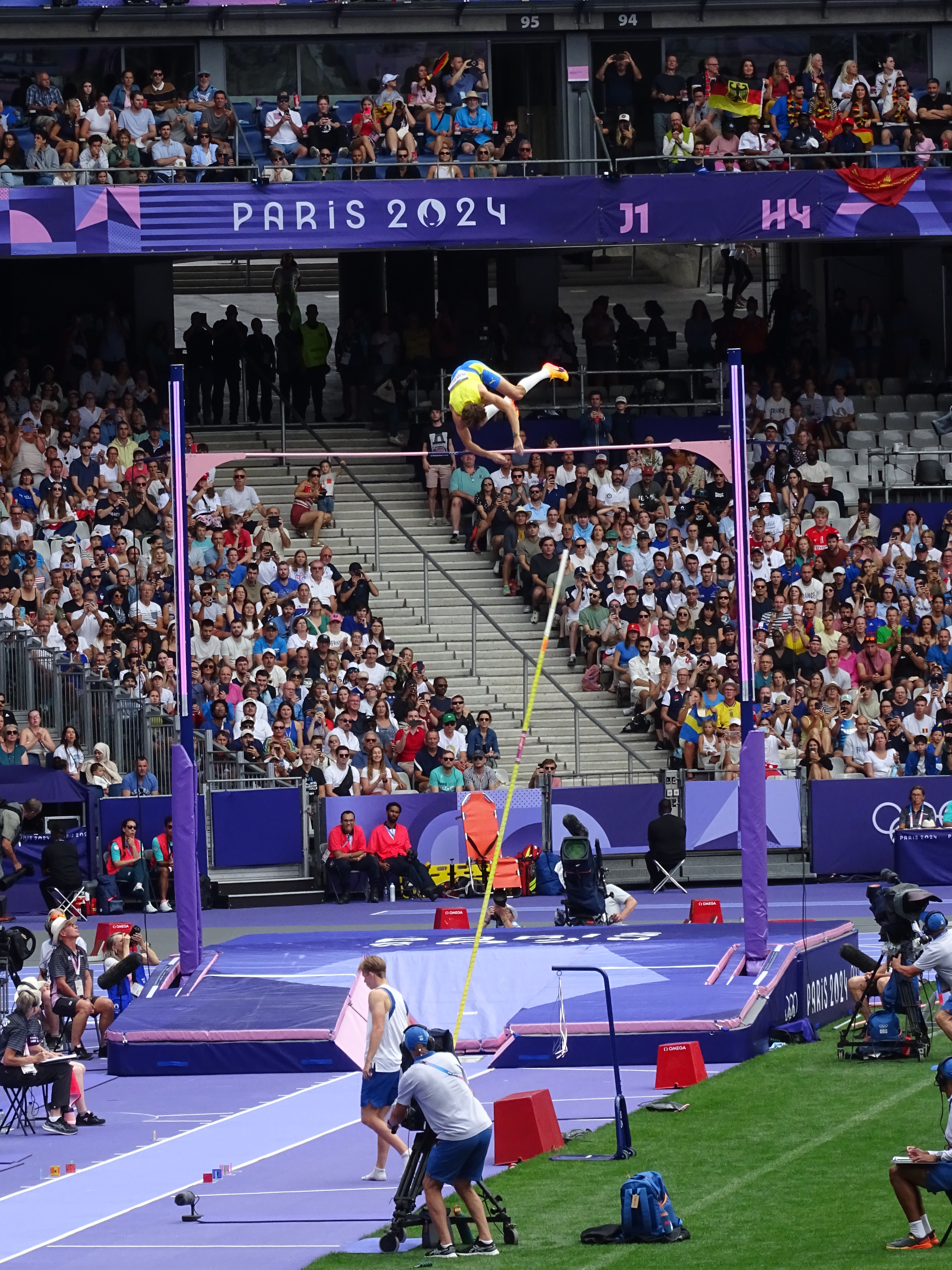
- Armand Duplantis, pole vaulting qualification, 3rd of August 2024
- Venue: Stade de France, Paris, France
- Date: 3 August 2024 (qualification) 5 August 2024 (final)
- Competitors: 31 from 19 nations
- Winning height: 6.25 WR

Medalists
1st place, gold medalist(s)		Armand Duplantis	Sweden
2nd place, silver medalist(s)		Sam Kendricks	United States
3rd place, bronze medalist(s)		Emmanouil Karalis	Greece

The men's pole vault at the 2024 Summer Olympics took place on 3 and 5 August 2024 at Stade de France. This was the 30th time that the event was contested at the Summer Olympics. Sweden's Armand Duplantis won his second consecutive Olympic gold medal, setting a world record of 6.25 metres (20 ft 6 in). Sam Kendricks of the United States earned the silver, while Emmanouil Karalis of Greece took the bronze.

== Background ==
The reigning Olympic champion Armand Duplantis has dominated the event since 2018, winning every major championship except for the 2019 World Championships and advancing the world record ten times since 2020. He sets his world records by 1 cm increments to pick up record bonuses as often as possible but frequently clears the bar by large margins. Only two other athletes have jumped within 0.18 m (7 in) of his record since he started his run: KC Lightfoot, who was not able to qualify through the US trials, and Sam Kendricks, who performed the jump in the 2019 USA Outdoor Track and Field Championships en route to beating Duplantis in that competition. Aside from Duplantis, Lightfoot, and Kendricks, only four other contemporary vaulters have recorded vaults of over 6 meters: Thiago Braz while winning the 2016 Olympics, Piotr Lisek, Chris Nilsen, and EJ Obiena. Nilsen, the returning silver medalist, is the only other athlete to successfully surpass that height this year. Braz, the bronze medalist from 2020, was serving a drug suspension and did not participate.

== Summary ==
In the qualification round, 10 athletes cleared 5.75 m (18 ft 10 3/8 in), five with perfect rounds including Duplantis. Two others with perfect rounds to 5.70 m also advanced. Nilsen and Lisek did not advance.

In the final, ten took jumps at 5.85 m (19 ft 2 5/16 in). Emmanouil Karalis, Ersu Şaşma, and Duplantis had clean rounds going. It was only Duplantis's second jump of the competition. Kendricks and Sondre Guttormsen missed their first attempt and passed. Huang Bokai made three unsuccessful attempts. At 5.90 m, Duplantis passed. Kendricks, Karalis, and Obiena all cleared on their first attempts. Kurtis Marschall, Şaşma, and Guttormsen missed once and passed to the next height. None of them would make it.

At 5.95 m, Kendricks and Duplantis made their first attempts; Karalis missed once and passed to 6.00 m (19 ft 8 1/4 in), which he had never cleared before. Obiena took all three of his attempts and failed. Only Duplantis cleared 6.00 m (on his first attempt) and the medals were settled; Obiena's earlier miss at 5.80 m gave Karalis the bronze and Kendricks silver. Having secured the gold medal, Duplantis asked for the bar to be set to an Olympic record 6.10 m (20 ft 3/16 in), which he cleared easily. His next request was to move to 6.25 m (20 ft 6 1/16 in), in an attempt to set a new world record, which he cleared on his third and final attempt.

Less than three weeks after the Olympics, Duplantis improved the world record again at 6.26 m in Silesia. Coincidentally, Duplantis, Kendricks, and Karalis repeated their placements and also won their respective medals.

=== Ammirati incident ===
One of the more memorable moments of the 2024 Olympics athletics programme—and of the 2024 Games as a whole—happened during the qualification round of the men's pole vault, when French competitor Anthony Ammirati failed one of his jumps when the bar appeared to be struck by his penis. A clip of the failed attempt subsequently went viral, and Ammirati was offered a $250,000 webcamming contract by pornographic streaming platform CamSoda. Variety described Ammirati as one of the most viral athletes at that Games, along with Yusuf Dikeç and Stephen Nedoroscik.

== Qualification ==
For the men's pole vault event, the qualification period was between 1 July 2023 and 30 June 2024. 32 athletes were able to qualify for the event, with a maximum of three athletes per nation, by jumping the entry standard of 5.82 m or higher or by their World Athletics Ranking for this event.

== Records ==
Prior to this competition, the existing world, Olympic, and area records were as follows.

Record	Athlete (Nation)	Height (m)	Location	Date
World record	Armand Duplantis (SWE)	6.24	Xiamen, China	20 April 2024
Olympic record	Thiago Braz (BRA)	6.03	Rio de Janeiro, Brazil	15 August 2016
World leading	Armand Duplantis (SWE)	6.24	Xiamen, China	20 April 2024

Area Record	Athlete (Nation)	Height (m)
Africa (records)	Okkert Brits (RSA)	6.03
Asia (records)	EJ Obiena (PHI)	6.00
Europe (records)	Armand Duplantis (SWE)	6.24 WR
North, Central America and Caribbean (records)	KC Lightfoot (USA)	6.07
Oceania (records)	Steve Hooker (AUS)	6.06
South America (records)	Thiago Braz (BRA)	6.03

The following records were established during the competition:

Date	Event	Athlete (Nation)	Height (m)	Record
5 August	Final	Armand Duplantis (SWE)	6.25	WR, OR

== Schedule ==
All times are Central European Summer Time (UTC+2)

The men's pole vault took place over two separate days.

Date	Time	Round
Saturday, 3 August 2024	10:10	Qualifying
Monday, 5 August 2024	19:00	Final

== Results ==
=== Qualification ===
32 athletes qualified for the first round by qualification time or world ranking.

Qualification Rules: Qualifying performance 5.80 (Q) or at least 12 best performers (q) advance to the Final.

Rank	Group	Athlete	Nation	5.40	5.60	5.70	5.75	Height	Notes
1	A	Armand Duplantis	Sweden	–	o	–	o	5.75	q
1	A	Sondre Guttormsen	Norway	o	o	o	o	5.75	q, =SB
1	A	Emmanouil Karalis	Greece	–	o	o	o	5.75	q
1	A	Ersu Şaşma	Turkey	o	o	o	o	5.75	q
1	B	Oleg Zernikel	Germany	o	o	o	o	5.75	q
6	A	Menno Vloon	Netherlands	xo	o	o	o	5.75	q
7	A	EJ Obiena	Philippines	–	xx-	o	o	5.75	q
8	A	Sam Kendricks	United States	o	o	xo	xo	5.75	q
9	B	Huang Bokai	China	o	xxo	o	xo	5.75	q, =PB
10	A	Bo Kanda Lita Baehre	Germany	xo	o	xxo	xxo	5.75	q
11	A	Valters Kreišs	Latvia	o	o	o	xxx	5.70	q
11	A	Kurtis Marschall	Australia	o	o	o		5.70	q
13	B	Claudio Stecchi	Italy	o	o	xo	xxx	5.70	SB
14	A	Thibaut Collet	France	o	xo	xxo	xxx	5.70	
15	A	Anthony Ammirati	France	o	o	xxx		5.60	
15	B	Ben Broeders	Belgium	o	o	xxx		5.60	
15	A	Simen Guttormsen	Norway	o	o	xxx		5.60	
15	B	Piotr Lisek	Poland	o	o	xxx		5.60	
15	A	Robert Sobera	Poland	o	o	xxx		5.60	
20	B	David Holý	Czech Republic	o	xo	xxx		5.60	
20	B	Yao Jie	China	o	xo	xxx		5.60	
22	A	Jacob Wooten	United States	o	xxo	xxx		5.60	
23	B	Torben Blech	Germany	o	xxx			5.40	
23	B	Robin Emig	France	o	xxx			5.40	
23	B	Matěj Ščerba	Czech Republic	o	xxx			5.40	
26	B	Pedro Buaró	Portugal	xo	xxx			5.40	
26	B	Christopher Nilsen	United States	xo	xxx			5.40	
26	B	Zhong Tao	China	xo	xxx			5.40	
29	B	Urho Kujanpää	Finland	xxo	xxx			5.40	
	B	Hussain Al-Hizam	Saudi Arabia	xxx				NM	
	B	Pål Haugen Lillefosse	Norway					DNS	

=== Final ===
Rank	Athlete	Nation	5.50	5.70	5.80	5.85	5.90	5.95	6.00	6.10	6.25	Height	Notes
1st place, gold medalist(s)	Armand Duplantis	Sweden	–	o	–	o	–	o	o	o	xxo	6.25	WR
2nd place, silver medalist(s)	Sam Kendricks	United States	o	o	o	x-	o	o	xxx	–		5.95	=SB
3rd place, bronze medalist(s)	Emmanouil Karalis	Greece	o	o	o	o	o	x-	xx	–		5.90	
4	EJ Obiena	Philippines	o	o	x-	o	o	xxx	–			5.90	
5	Ersu Şaşma	Turkey	o	o	o	o	x-	xx	–			5.85	SB
6	Kurtis Marschall	Australia	o	o	x-	o	x-	xx	–			5.85	
7	Huang Bokai	China	o	xo	o	xxx	–					5.80	PB
8	Sondre Guttormsen	Norway	o	xxo	o	x-	x-	x	–			5.80	SB
9	Bo Kanda Lita Baehre	Germany	o	o	xx-	x	–					5.70	
9	Oleg Zernikel	Germany	o	o	xx-	x	–					5.70	
11	Menno Vloon	Netherlands	o	xxo	xxx	–						5.70	
12	Valters Kreišs	Latvia	xo	xxx	–							5.50	
