= Adam Hague =

English pole vaulter (born 1997)

Personal information
- Born: 29 August 1997 (age 28) Rotherham, England
- Education: Sheffield Hallam University
- Height: 1.85 m (6 ft 1 in)
- Weight: 73 kg (161 lb)

Sport
- Sport: Athletics
- Event: Pole vault
- Club: Sheffield & Dearne
- Coached by: Trevor Fox
Medal record
Men's athletics
European Junior Championships
Gold medal – first place	2015 Eskilstuna	Pole vault
Representing England
Commonwealth Games
Silver medal – second place	2022 Birmingham	pole vault

Adam Hague (born 29 August 1997) is an English athlete specialising in the pole vault. He won a silver medal at the Commonwealth Games.

== Biography ==
Hague won gold medal at the 2015 European Junior Championships. In addition, he competed at the 2018 Commonwealth Games finishing fourth. Four years later, at the 2022 Commonwealth Games, he won his first senior medal, a silver in the pole vault.

His personal bests in the event are 5.65 metres outdoors (Berlin 2018) and 5.65 metres indoors (Birmingham 2018).

He represented England at the 2022 Commonwealth Games in Birmingham, where he won a silver medal.

Hague podiumed eight times British Athletics Championships from 2018 to 2025.

== International competitions ==
Year	Competition	Venue	Position	Notes
Representing Great Britain and England
2013	World Youth Championships	Donetsk, Ukraine	6th	4.90 m
2014	World Junior Championships	Eugene, United States	8th	5.35 m
2015	European Junior Championships	Eskilstuna, Sweden	1st	5.50 m
2016	World U20 Championships	Bydgoszcz, Poland	5th	5.40 m
2018	Commonwealth Games	Gold Coast, Australia	4th	5.45 m
2018	European Championships	Berlin, Germany	10th	5.65 m
2019	European U23 Championships	Gävle, Sweden	7th	5.50 m
