= 2024 World Athletics Indoor Championships – Men's pole vault =

Men's pole vault at the 2024 World Athletics Indoor Championships
- Venue: Commonwealth Arena
- Dates: 1–3 March
- Competitors: 11 from 10 nations

Medalists
| gold medal | Armand Duplantis | Sweden |
| silver medal | Sam Kendricks | United States |
| bronze medal | Emmanouil Karalis | Greece |

The men's pole vault at the 2024 World Athletics Indoor Championships took place on 3 March 2024.

== Results ==
The final was started at 19:00.

| Rank | Athlete | Nationality | 5.50 | 5.65 | 5.75 | 5.85 | 5.90 | 5.95 | 6.00 | 6.05 | 6.24 | Result | Notes |
|---|---|---|---|---|---|---|---|---|---|---|---|---|---|
| 1st place, gold medalist(s) | Armand Duplantis | Sweden | – | o | – | xxo | – | xo | – | xxo | xxx | 6.05 | |
| 2nd place, silver medalist(s) | Sam Kendricks | United States | o | o | o | o | o | xx– | x | | | 5.90 | |
| 3rd place, bronze medalist(s) | Emmanouil Karalis | Greece | x– | xo | xo | o | x– | xx | | | | 5.85 | |
| 4 | Chris Nilsen | United States | – | o | o | xxx | | | | | | 5.75 | |
| 5 | Kurtis Marschall | Australia | xo | o | o | xxx | | | | | | 5.75 | |
| 6 | Ben Broeders | Belgium | o | o | xxx | | | | | | | 5.65 | |
| 6 | Thibaut Collet | France | – | o | xxx | | | | | | | 5.65 | |
| 8 | Menno Vloon | Netherlands | x– | o | xxx | | | | | | | 5.65 | |
| 9 | Ernest John Obiena | Philippines | – | xo | – | xx– | x | | | | | 5.65 | |
| 10 | Ersu Şaşma | Turkey | o | xxx | | | | | | | | 5.50 | |
| | Piotr Lisek | Poland | x– | x– | x | | | | | | | NM | |
