= 2025 World Athletics Championships – Men's pole vault =

Men's pole vault at the 2025 World Athletics Championships
- Venue: National Stadium
- Location: Tokyo, Japan
- Dates: 13 September (qualification); 15 September (final)
- Winning height: 6.30 m WR

Medalists
gold medal	Armand Duplantis	Sweden
silver medal	Emmanouil Karalis	Greece
bronze medal	Kurtis Marschall	Australia

The men's pole vault at the 2025 World Athletics Championships was held at the National Stadium in Tokyo on 13 and 15 September 2025.

== Summary ==
Armand Duplantis entered the competition as the favourite, having won every major championship, from 2020 onwards. The field also included Emmanouil Karalis, who moved into the #4 position of all time with a 6.08m clearance earlier in the year, Sam Kendricks, the only man to beat Duplantis at a major championship, at the 2019 Championships when Duplantis was 19. Even former world record holder, about to turn 39, Renaud Lavillenie was present. It took 5.75 in the qualifying round to make the final.

Eight men were still vaulting at 5.90m, Lavillenie having passed 5.85m to get there. Karalis, Kurtis Marschall, Thibaut Collet, Sondre Guttormsen and Menno Vloon cleared on their first attempts. Duplantis had already passed. After Kendricks and Lavillenie missed, they passed to 5.95m with nothing to gain at 5.90m. Duplantis cleared 5.95m on his first attempt, still with a clean round. Marschall cleared on his second attempt, setting a personal best. Kendricks' strategy paid off when he cleared on his second attempt, but with that miss at 5.90m, he was in third place. On his third attempt, Karalis was the only other one over 5.95m. At six meters, Karalis then Duplantis cleared. Both men passed 6.05m. At 6.10m, twenty feet, Karalis had a narrow miss. Duplantis sailed over the bar. Karalis walked over to the official to pass to 6.15m where he became only the fourth man to attempt the height. After he missed Duplantis flew over the bar and the cycle repeated. Now Karalis would be the only other person to attempt 6.20m. Karalis made a credible attempt but the bar came down making Duplantis the winner. This time he would walk to the official to pass to a new world record 6.30m. The crowd got to see a couple of rarities, first with Duplantis missing twice in a row. Then, after the long wait, on his final attempt, with a little brush on the way up, Duplantis cleared. It was his 14th World Record which he first celebrated with the camaraderie of other vaulters.

== Records ==
Before the competition records were as follows:

Record	Athlete & Nat.	Perf.	Location	Date
World Record	Armand Duplantis (SWE)	6.29 m	Budapest. Hungary	12 August 2025
Championship Record	Armand Duplantis (SWE)	6.21 m	Eugene, United States	24 July 2022
World Leading	Armand Duplantis (SWE)	6.29 m	Budapest. Hungary	12 August 2025
African Record	Okkert Brits (RSA)	6.03 m	Cologne, Germany	18 August 1995
Asian Record	Ernest John Obiena (PHI)	6.00 m	Bergen, Norway	10 June 2023
European Record	Armand Duplantis (SWE)	6.29 m	Budapest. Hungary	12 August 2025
North, Central American and Caribbean Record	KC Lightfoot (USA)	6.07 m	Nashville, United States	2 June 2023
South American Record	Thiago Braz (BRA)	6.03 m	Rio de Janeiro, Brazil	15 August 2016
Oceanian Record	Steven Hooker (AUS)	6.06 m (i)	Boston, United States	7 February 2009

== Qualification standard ==
The standard to qualify automatically for entry was 5.82 m.

== Schedule ==
The event schedule, in local time (UTC+9), was as follows:

Date	Time	Round
13 September	19:05	Qualification
15 September	19:49	Final

== Results ==
=== Qualification ===
All athletes over 5.80 m ( Q ) or at least the 12 best performers ( q ) advanced to the final.

==== Group A ====
Place	Athlete	Nation	5.40	5.55	5.70	5.75	Mark	Notes
1	Emmanouil Karalis	Greece	–	o	–	o	5.75	q
1	Sam Kendricks	United States	–	o	o	o	5.75	q
1	Armand Duplantis	Sweden	–	o	–	o	5.75	q
1	Sondre Guttormsen	Norway	o	o	o	o	5.75	q
5	Kurtis Marschall	Australia	o	o	xo	o	5.75	q
6	Bo Kanda Lita Baehre	Germany	xo	xo	o	o	5.75	q, SB
7	Renaud Lavillenie	France	–	o	xxo	xo	5.75	q
8	Ersu Şaşma	Turkey	–	xxo	–	xxo	5.75	q
9	Ben Broeders	Belgium	o	o	xo	xxx	5.70	
10	Hussain Asim Al Hizam	Saudi Arabia	xo	xo	xxo	xxx	5.70	
11	Ernest John Obiena	Philippines	–	o	xx–	x	5.55	
11	Matěj Ščerba	Czech Republic	o	o	xxx		5.55	
12	Simone Bertelli	Italy	xo	o	xxx		5.55	
14	Valters Kreišs	Latvia	o	xxo	xxx		5.55	
14	Austin Miller	United States	o	xxo	xxx		5.55	
16	Simen Guttormsen	Norway	o	xxx			5.40	
–	Kyle Rademeyer	South Africa	xxx				NM	
–	Urho Kujanpää	Finland	xxx				NM	

==== Group B ====
Place	Athlete	Nation	5.40	5.55	5.70	5.75	Mark	Notes
1	Menno Vloon	Netherlands	o	o	xo	o	5.75	q
2	Ethan Cormont	France	o	o	xxo	o	5.75	q
3	Thibaut Collet	France	–	xo	o	xo	5.75	q
4	Seif Heneida	Qatar	o	xo	xo	xxo	5.75	q, NR
5	David Holý	Czech Republic	o	o	o	xxx	5.70	
6	Piotr Lisek	Poland	–	o	o	xxx	5.70	
7	Matt Ludwig	United States	o	xo	o	xxx	5.70	
8	Oleksandr Onufriyev	Ukraine	o	o	xxx		5.55	
9	Li Chenyang	China	xo	o	xxx		5.55	
10	Oleg Zernikel	Germany	xxo	xo	xxx		5.55	
11	Márton Böndör	Hungary	o	xxx			5.40	
11	Artur Coll	Spain	o	xxx			5.40	
11	Zhong Tao	China	o	xxx			5.40	
14	Torben Blech	Germany	xo	xxx			5.40	
14	Ioannis Rizos	Greece	xo	xxx			5.40	
–	Huang Bokai	China	–	xxx			NM	
–	Ricardo Montes de Oca	Venezuela	xxx				NM	
–	Matteo Oliveri	Italy	xxx				NM	

=== Final ===
Place	Athlete	Nation	5.55	5.75	5.85	5.90	5.95	6.00	6.05	6.10	6.15	6.20	6.30	Mark	Notes
1st place, gold medalist(s)	Armand Duplantis	Sweden	o	–	o	–	o	o	–	o	o	–	xxo	6.30	WR
2nd place, silver medalist(s)	Emmanouil Karalis	Greece	–	o	–	o	xxo	o	–	x–	x–	x		6.00	
3rd place, bronze medalist(s)	Kurtis Marschall	Australia	o	o	o	o	xo	xxx						5.95	PB
4	Sam Kendricks	United States	o	o	o	x–	xo	xxx						5.95	SB
5	Thibaut Collet	France	xo	o	o	o	xx–	x						5.90	
6	Sondre Guttormsen	Norway	o	xxo	xo	o	x–	xx						5.90	SB
7	Menno Vloon	Netherlands	o	xxo	xxo	o	x–	xx						5.90	
8	Renaud Lavillenie	France	–	o	–	x–	xx							5.75	
9	Seif Heneida	Qatar	o	xo	xxx									5.75	NR
10	Bo Kanda Lita Baehre	Germany	o	xxo	xxx									5.75	SB
11	Ethan Cormont	France	xo	xxx										5.55	
	Ersu Şaşma	Turkey	xxx											NM	
