= 2018 IAAF World U20 Championships – Men's pole vault =

Men's pole vault at the 2018 World U20 Championships
- Venue: Ratina Stadium
- Dates: 11 July (qualification); 14 July (final)
- Competitors: 22 from 16 nations
- Winning height: 5.82 m

Medalists
gold medal	Armand Duplantis	Sweden
silver medal	Zachery Bradford	United States
bronze medal	Masaki Ejima	Japan

The men's pole vault at the 2018 IAAF World U20 Championships was held at Ratina Stadium on 11 and 14 July.

== Records ==
Standing records prior to the 2018 IAAF World U20 Championships in Athletics
World U20 Record	Armand Duplantis (SWE)	5.93	Baton Rouge, United States	5 May 2018
Championship Record	Germán Chiaraviglio (ARG)	5.71	Beijing, China	19 August 2006
World U20 Leading	Armand Duplantis (SWE)	5.93	Baton Rouge, United States	5 May 2018

== Results ==
=== Qualification ===
The qualification round took place on 11 July, in two groups, both starting at 17:00. Athletes attaining a mark of at least 5.35 metres ( Q ) or at least the 12 best performers ( q ) qualified for the final.

Rank	Group	Name	Nationality	4.80	4.95	5.10	5.20	5.30	Mark	Notes
1	A	Armand Duplantis	Sweden	–	–	–	–	o	5.30	q
2	B	Sondre Guttormsen	Norway	–	–	o	o		5.20	q
2	A	Zachery Bradford	United States	–	–	–	o		5.20	q
4	B	Shunto Ozaki	Japan	xo	o	xxo	o		5.20	q, PB
5	B	Bo Kanda Lita Baehre	Germany	–	–	o	xo		5.20	q
5	A	Ethan Cormont	France	–	o	o	xo		5.20	q
5	A	Masaki Ejima	Japan	–	–	–	xo		5.20	q
8	B	Cole Riddle	United States	–	–	xxo	xo		5.20	q
8	B	Thibaut Collet	France	–	–	xxo	xo		5.20	q
10	A	Valko van Wyk	South Africa	o	xxo	xxo	xxo		5.20	q
11	B	Illya Kravchenko	Ukraine	–	o	o	xxx		5.10	q
11	A	José Antonio Maldonado	Spain	o	o	o	xxx		5.10	q
13	B	Ersu Şaşma	Turkey	–	o	xo	xxx		5.10	
13	A	Riccardo Klotz	Austria	–	o	xo	xxx		5.10	
13	A	Taras Shevtsov	Ukraine	o	o	xo	xxx		5.10	PB
16	B	Santtu Koskiaho	Finland	xo	xo	xo	xxx		5.10	PB
17	A	Matteo Madrassi	Italy	xxo	xo	xxo	xxx		5.10	PB
18	B	Andrea Marin	Italy	o	xxx				4.80	
18	A	Pablo Zaffaroni	Argentina	o	xxx				4.80	
20	B	Csanád Simonváros	Hungary	xo	xxx				4.80	
20	B	Javier Fernández	Spain	xo	xxx				4.80	
	A	Maxim Goldovsky	Israel	xxx					NH	

=== Final ===
The final was held on 14 July at 13:49.

Rank	Name	Nationality	4.85	5.05	5.20	5.30	5.40	5.45	5.50	5.55	5.60	5.82	6.01	Mark	Notes
1st place, gold medalist(s)	Armand Duplantis	Sweden	–	–	–	–	–	–	o	–	o	o	xxx	5.82	CR
2nd place, silver medalist(s)	Zachery Bradford	United States	–	–	o	o	o	–	o	xxo	xxx			5.55	PB
3rd place, bronze medalist(s)	Masaki Ejima	Japan	–	–	o	–	xxo	–	o	xxo	xxx			5.55	SB
4	Bo Kanda Lita Baehre	Germany	–	–	–	o	o	–	o	–	xxx			5.50	
5	Thibaut Collet	France	–	–	o	–	o	–	x-	xx				5.40	
6	Sondre Guttormsen	Norway	–	–	o	–	xo	–	x-	x-	x			5.40	
7	Cole Riddle	United States	–	–	xo	xo	xxx							5.30	
8	Ethan Cormont	France	–	xxo	xo	xo	xxx							5.30	PB
9	Valko van Wyk	South Africa	o	xo	xxo	xo	xxx							5.30	
10	Shunto Ozaki	Japan	o	xo	xo	xxx								5.20	PB
11	Illya Kravchenko	Ukraine	–	o	xxx									5.05	
12	José Antonio Maldonado	Spain	xo	o	xxx									5.05	
