= Bo Kanda Lita Baehre =

German pole vaulter (born 1999)

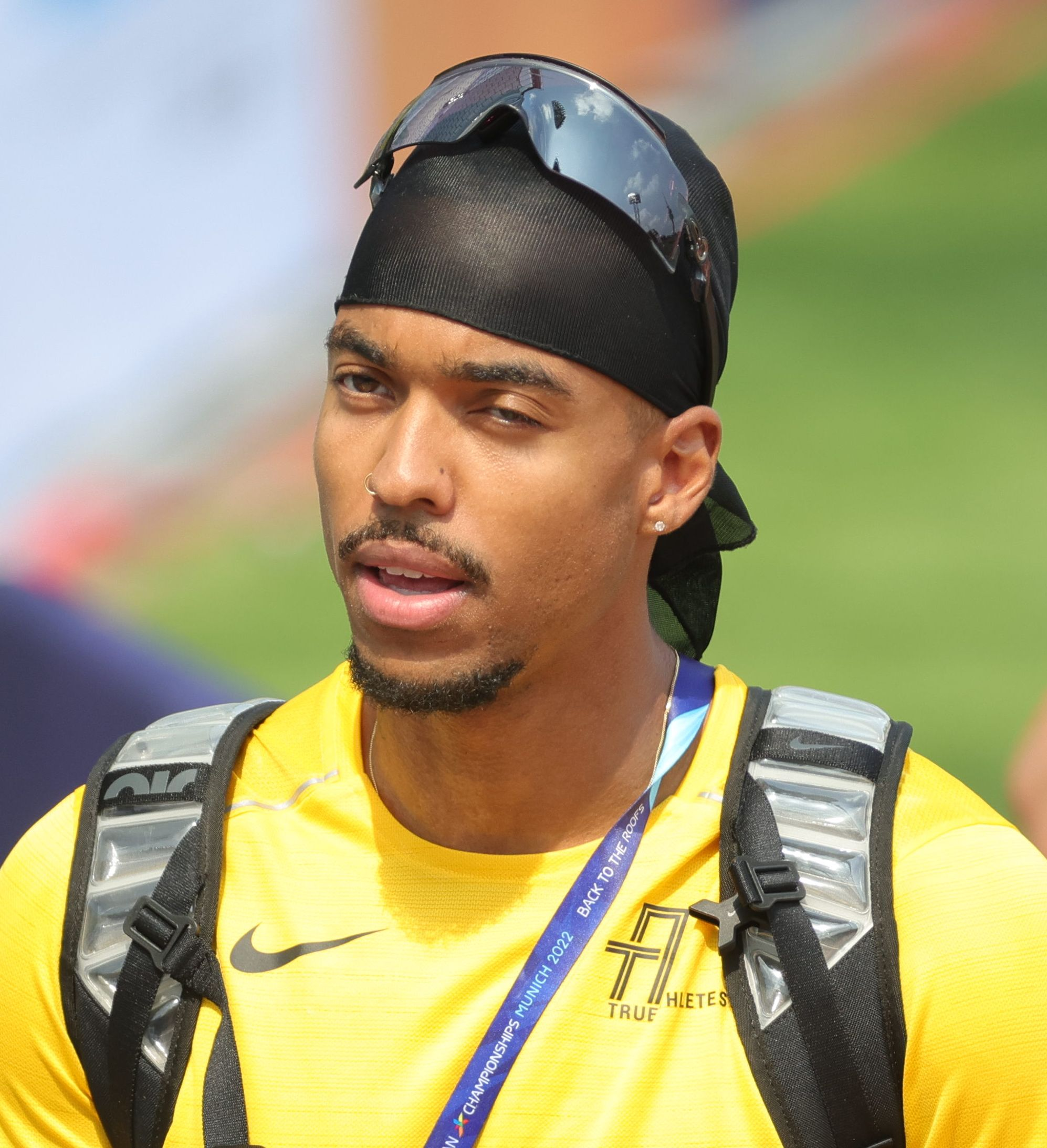
- Bo Kanda Lita Baehre in 2022

Personal information
- Born: 29 April 1999 (age 27) Düsseldorf, Germany
- Height: 1.93 m (6 ft 4 in)
- Weight: 89 kg (196 lb)

Sport
- Sport: Athletics
- Event: Pole vault
- Club: Düsseldorf Athletics; ART Düsseldorf; TSV Bayer Leverkusen
- Coached by: Christine Adams; Chauncey Johnson
Medal record
European Championships
Silver medal – second place	2022 Munich	Pole vault

Bo Kanda Lita Baehre (born 29 April 1999) is an Afro-German athlete specialising in the pole vault. He won a silver medal at the 2022 European Championships.

His personal bests in the event are 5.90 metres outdoors (Berlin 2022) and 5.81 metres indoors (Düsseldorf 2022).

== Personal life ==
Born in Germany, he is of DR Congolese descent through his father. He is a cousin of a British footballer, Leroy Lita.

== International competitions ==
Year	Competition	Venue	Position	Notes
Representing Germany
2015	European Youth Olympic Festival	Tbilisi, Georgia	1st	4.92 m
2016	European Youth Championships	Tbilisi, Georgia	2nd	5.30 m
2017	European U20 Championships	Grosseto, Italy	2nd	5.45 m
2018	World U20 Championships	Tampere, Finland	4th	5.50 m
2018	European Championships	Berlin, Germany	15th (q)	5.51 m
2019	European Indoor Championships	Glasgow, United Kingdom	7th	5.55 m
2019	European U23 Championships	Gävle, Sweden	1st	5.65 m
2019	World Championships	Doha, Qatar	4th	5.70 m
2021	European Indoor Championships	Toruń, Poland	4th (q)	5.60 m^{1}
2021	Olympic Games	Tokyo, Japan	11th	5.70 m
2022	World Championships	Eugene, United States	7th	5.87 m
2022	European Championships	Munich, Germany	2nd	5.85 m
2023	European Indoor Championships	Istanbul, Turkey	9th	5.40 m
2024	European Championships	Rome, Italy	14th (q)	5.45 m
2024	Olympic Games	Paris, France	9th	5.70 m
2025	European Indoor Championships	Apeldoorn, Netherlands	7th	5.70 m
2025	World Indoor Championships	Nanjing, China	8th	5.50 m
2025	World Championships	Tokyo, Japan	10th	5.75 m
2026	European Championships	Birmingham, United Kingdom	9th	5.70 m

^{1}No mark in the final
