= Thibaut Collet =

French athletics competitor

Personal information
- Born: 17 June 1999 (age 27) La Tronche, France
- Height: 1.77 m (5 ft 10 in)
- Weight: 75 kg (165 lb)

Sport
- Sport: Athletics
- Event: Pole vault
- Club: Entente Athletique Grenoble 38
- Coached by: Philippe Collet; Philippe d'Encausse
Medal record
Men's athletics
Representing France
European Games
| Bronze medal – third place | 2023 Kraków-Małopolska | Pole vault |

Thibaut Collet (born 17 June 1999, in La Tronche) is a French athlete specialising in the pole vault. He won a bronze medal at the 2019 European U23 Championships.

His personal bests are 5.95 metres outdoors (Grenoble 2024) and 5.92 metres indoors (Clermont-Ferrand 2024).

He and his older brother Mathieu are coached by their father Philippe Collet, himself a former pole vaulter.

== International competitions ==
| Year | Competition | Venue | Position | Notes |
Representing France
| 2016 | European Youth Championships | Tbilisi, Georgia | 5th | 4.95 m |
| 2018 | World U20 Championships | Tampere, Finland | 5th | 5.40 m |
| 2019 | Mediterranean U23 Indoor Championships | Miramas, France | 2nd | 5.45 m |
| 2019 | European U23 Championships | Gävle, Sweden | 3rd | 5.60 m |
| 2021 | European U23 Championships | Tallinn, Estonia | 6th | 5.50 m |
| 2022 | World Indoor Championships | Belgrade, Serbia | 12th | 5.60 m |
| 2022 | World Championships | Eugene, United States | 18th (q) | 5.65 m |
| 2022 | European Championships | Munich, Germany | 5th | 5.75 m |
| 2023 | European Indoor Championships | Istanbul, Turkey | 10th (q) | 5.65 m |
| 2023 | World Championships | Budapest, Hungary | 5th | 5.90 m |
| 2024 | World Indoor Championships | Glasgow, United Kingdom | 6th | 5.65 m |
| 2024 | European Championships | Rome, Italy | 5th | 5.82 m |
| 2024 | Olympic Games | Paris, France | 14th (q) | 5.70 m |
| 2025 | European Indoor Championships | Apeldoorn, Netherlands | 4th | 5.85 m |
| 2025 | World Indoor Championships | Nanjing, China | 11th | 5.50 m |
| 2025 | World Championships | Tokyo, Japan | 5th | 5.90 m |
| 2026 | World Indoor Championships | Toruń, Poland | 8th | 5.85 m |
| 2026 | European Championships | Birmingham, United Kingdom | – | NM |
