= 2025 World Athletics Indoor Championships – Men's pole vault =

Men's pole vault at the 2025 World Athletics Indoor Championships
- Venue: Nanjing's Cube at Nanjing Youth Olympic Sports Park
- Location: Nanjing, China
- Dates: 22 March
- Competitors: 12 from 11 nations
- Winning height: 6.15 m

Medalists
gold medal	Armand Duplantis	Sweden
silver medal	Emmanouil Karalis	Greece
bronze medal	Sam Kendricks	United States

The men's pole vault at the 2025 World Athletics Indoor Championships took place on the short track of the Nanjing's Cube at Nanjing Youth Olympic Sports Park in Nanjing, China, on 22 March 2025. This was the 21st time the event was contested at the World Athletics Indoor Championships. Athletes could qualify by achieving the entry standard or by their World Athletics Ranking in the event.

The final was scheduled for 22 March during the evening session.

== Background ==
The men's pole vault was contested 20 times before 2025, at every previous edition of the World Athletics Indoor Championships.

Records before the 2025 World Athletics Indoor Championships
Record	Athlete (nation)	Height (m)	Location	Date
World record	Armand Duplantis (SWE)	6.27	Clermont-Ferrand, France	28 February 2025
Championship record	Armand Duplantis (SWE)	6.20	Belgrade, Serbia	20 March 2022
World leading	Armand Duplantis (SWE)	6.27	Clermont-Ferrand, France	28 February 2025

== Qualification ==
For the men's pole vault, the qualification period ran from 1 September 2024 until 9 March 2025. Athletes could qualify by achieving the entry standards of 5.85 m. Athletes could also qualify by virtue of their World Athletics Ranking for the event or by virtue of their World Athletics Indoor Tour wildcard. There was a target number of 12 athletes.

== Final ==
The final was held on 22 March, starting at 18:34 (UTC+8).

Place	Athlete	Nation	5.50	5.70	5.80	5.90	5.95	6.00	6.05	6.10	6.15	Result	Notes
1st place, gold medalist(s)	Armand Duplantis	Sweden	–	o	–	o	–	o	o	xo	o	6.15	
2nd place, silver medalist(s)	Emmanouil Karalis	Greece	–	o	o	o	o	–	o	xx–	x	6.05	NR
3rd place, bronze medalist(s)	Sam Kendricks	United States	o	o	o	o	xx–	x				5.90	=SB
4	Menno Vloon	Netherlands	o	xo	o	x–	xx					5.80	
5	Kurtis Marschall	Australia	o	o	xxo	x–	xx					5.80	
6	Ersu Şaşma	Turkey	o	xo	xxo	x–	xx					5.80	
7	Sondre Guttormsen	Norway	o	xo	xxx							5.70	
8	Valters Kreišs	Latvia	o	xxx								5.50	
8	Li Chenyang	China	o	xxx								5.50	
8	Bo Kanda Lita Baehre	Germany	o	xxx								5.50	
11	Thibaut Collet	France	xo	xxx								5.50	
—	Baptiste Thiery	France	xxx									NM	
