= Menno Vloon =

Dutch pole vaulter (born 1994)

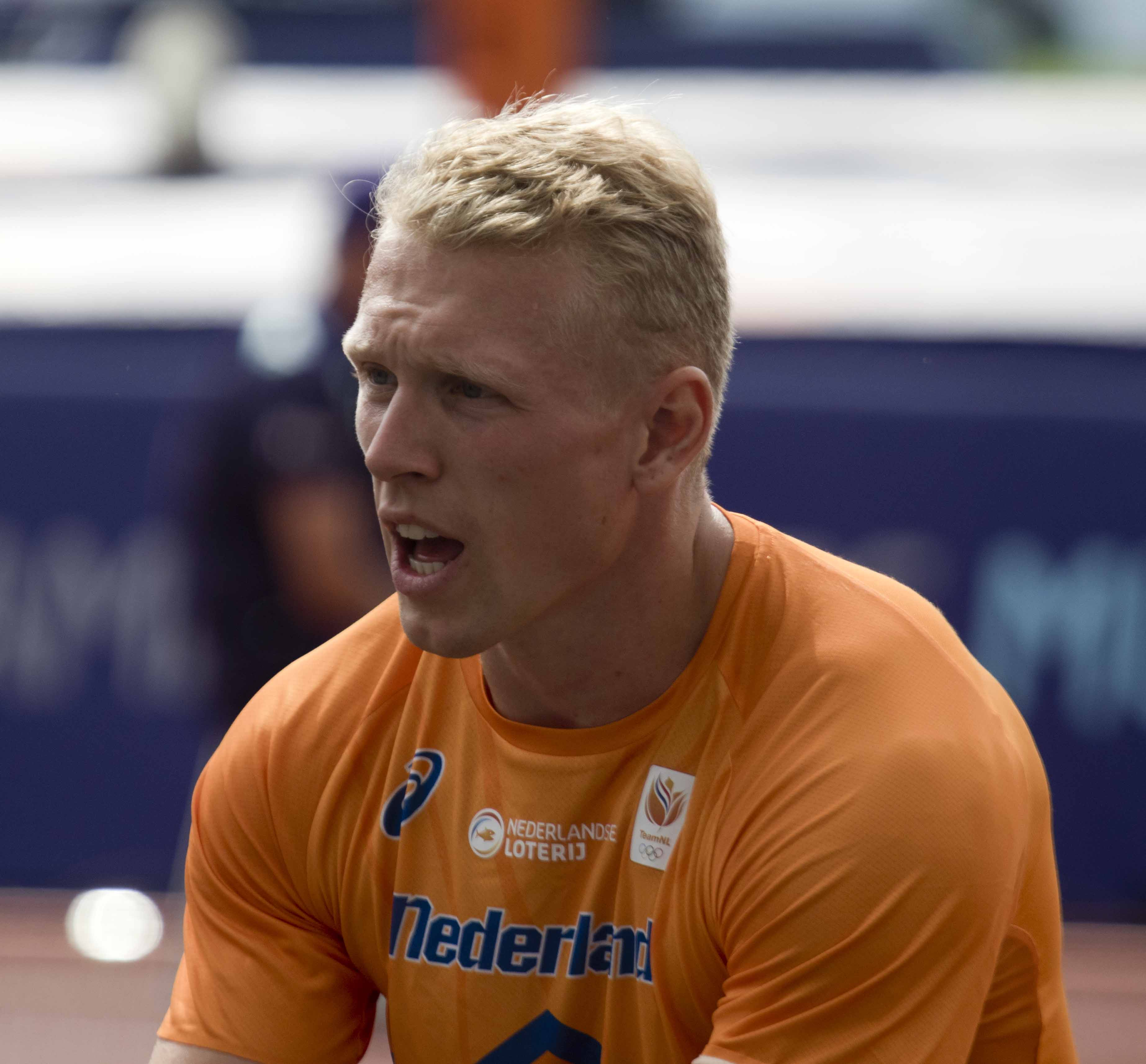

Personal information
- National team: Netherlands
- Born: 11 May 1994 (age 32) Zaandam, Netherlands

Sport
- Sport: Athletics
- Event: Pole vault

Achievements and titles
- Personal best: Pole vault (i): 5.96 m (2021)
Medal record
Men's athletics
Representing Netherlands
European Indoor Championships
Gold medal – first place	2025 Apeldoorn	Pole vault
European Games
Gold medal – first place	2023 Kraków-Małopolska	Pole vault

Menno Vloon (Dutch: [ˈmɛnoː ˈvloːn]; born 11 May 1994) is a Dutch pole vaulter.

== Career ==
He finished eighth at the 2015 European U23 Championships. He also competed at the 2012 World Junior Championships, the 2016 European Championships and the 2017 World Championships without reaching the final.

In 2021, he set a Dutch national indoor record with 5.96 metres.

== Achievements ==
Year	Competition	Venue	Position	Notes
Representing the Netherlands
2011	European Youth Olympic Festival	Trabzon, Turkey	9th	4.65 m
2012	World Junior Championships	Barcelona, Spain	17th (q)	4.95 m
2015	European U23 Championships	Tallinn, Estonia	8th	5.30 m
2016	European Championships	Amsterdam, Netherlands	17th (q)	5.35 m
2017	World Championships	London, United Kingdom	–	NM
2021	European Indoor Championships	Toruń, Poland	5th	5.70 m
2021	Olympic Games	Tokyo, Japan	13th	5.55 m
2022	World Indoor Championships	Belgrade, Serbia	5th	5.75 m
2022	World Championships	Eugene, United States	9th (q)	5.75 m^{1}
2022	European Championships	Munich, Germany	9th (q)	5.65 m^{1}
2023	European Indoor Championships	Istanbul, Turkey	11th (q)	5.55 m
2023	World Championships	Budapest, Hungary	16th (q)	5.70 m
2024	World Indoor Championships	Glasgow, United Kingdom	8th	5.65 m
2024	European Championships	Rome, Italy	8th	5.75 m
2024	Olympic Games	Paris, France	11th	5.70 m
2025	European Indoor Championships	Apeldoorn, Netherlands	1st	5.90 m
2025	World Indoor Championships	Nanjing, China	4th	5.80 m
2025	World Championships	Tokyo, Japan	7th	5.90 m
2026	World Indoor Championships	Toruń, Poland	7th	5.85 m
2026	European Championships	Birmingham, United Kingdom	–	NM

^{1}No mark in the final

Awards
Preceded by Churandy Martina	Men's Dutch Athlete of the Year; 2017	Succeeded by Sifan Hassan as Dutch Athlete of the Year
