= Zach Bradford =

American pole vaulter (born 1999)

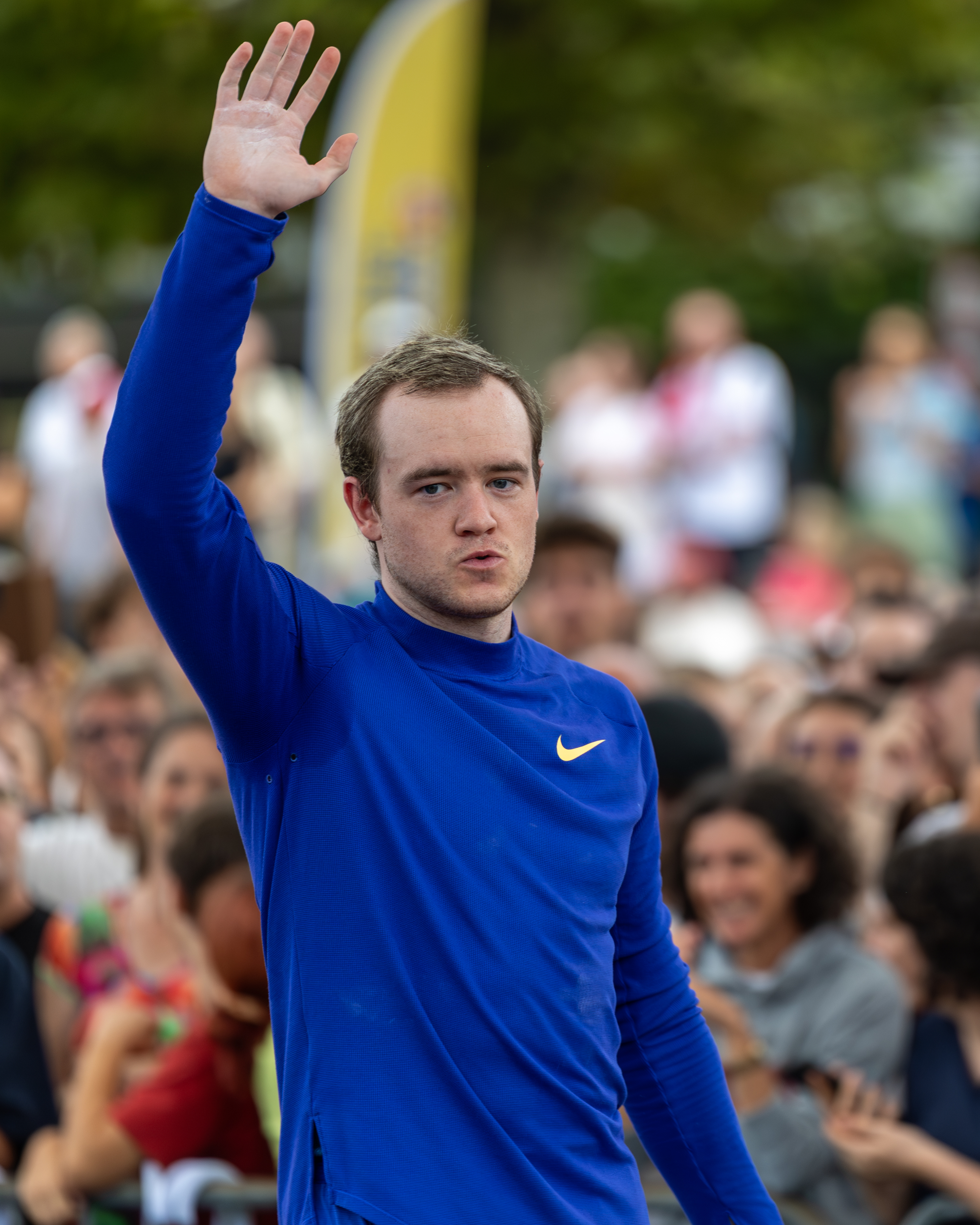

Personal information
- Born: November 29, 1999 (age 26)

Sport
- Country: United States
- Event: Pole vault
- Coached by: Zach Bradford

Achievements and titles
- Personal bests: Indoor: 6.01 m (2026); Outdoor: 5.87 m (2023)
Medal record
Representing United States
World U20 Championships
Silver medal – second place	2018 Tampere	Pole vault
NACAC U23 Championships
Silver medal – second place	2019 Queretaro	Pole vault

Zachery Bradford (born November 29, 1999) is an American athlete specializing in pole vault.

He finished second, behind Armand Duplantis, at 2018 IAAF World U20 Championships in Tampere. He qualified to the U20 Championships by winning the 2018 USATF U20 Outdoor Championships, setting the meet record in the process. His outdoor personal best is 5.77 meters, in Lawrence, Kansas, on April 20, 2019. It is the Kansas Relays meet record. Later in the 2019 season he won the silver medal at the 2019 NACAC U23 Championships in Athletics sharing the meet record with fellow US vaulter Clayton Fritsch. Because winner Sam Kendricks was the defending World Champion and later also the 2019 Diamond League Champion, Bradford finishing 4th at the 2019 US outdoor Championships in Des Moines qualified him for World Championships in Doha.

Started his sophomore college indoor season winning 4 of the 5 meets setting meet, facility and Kansas records along the way. Set a personal indoor best vault of 5.80 at the Tyson Invitational achieving the 2020 Olympic standard. Qualified for the NCAA Indoor Championships that were later canceled due to the coronavirus pandemic. He later transferred to the Texas Tech Red Raiders track and field team.

While at Bloomington High School in Bloomington, Illinois, he was a three time 3A state champion and currently holds the state meet record at 17' 6". Holds the all time outdoor state record of 17' 9" (18' 2.50" unattached) and an indoor record of 18' 0.5". On February 28, 2026, Bradford joined the 6 meters club by jumping 6.01 at the U.S. Indoor Championships.
