= Sondre Guttormsen =

Norwegian pole vaulter

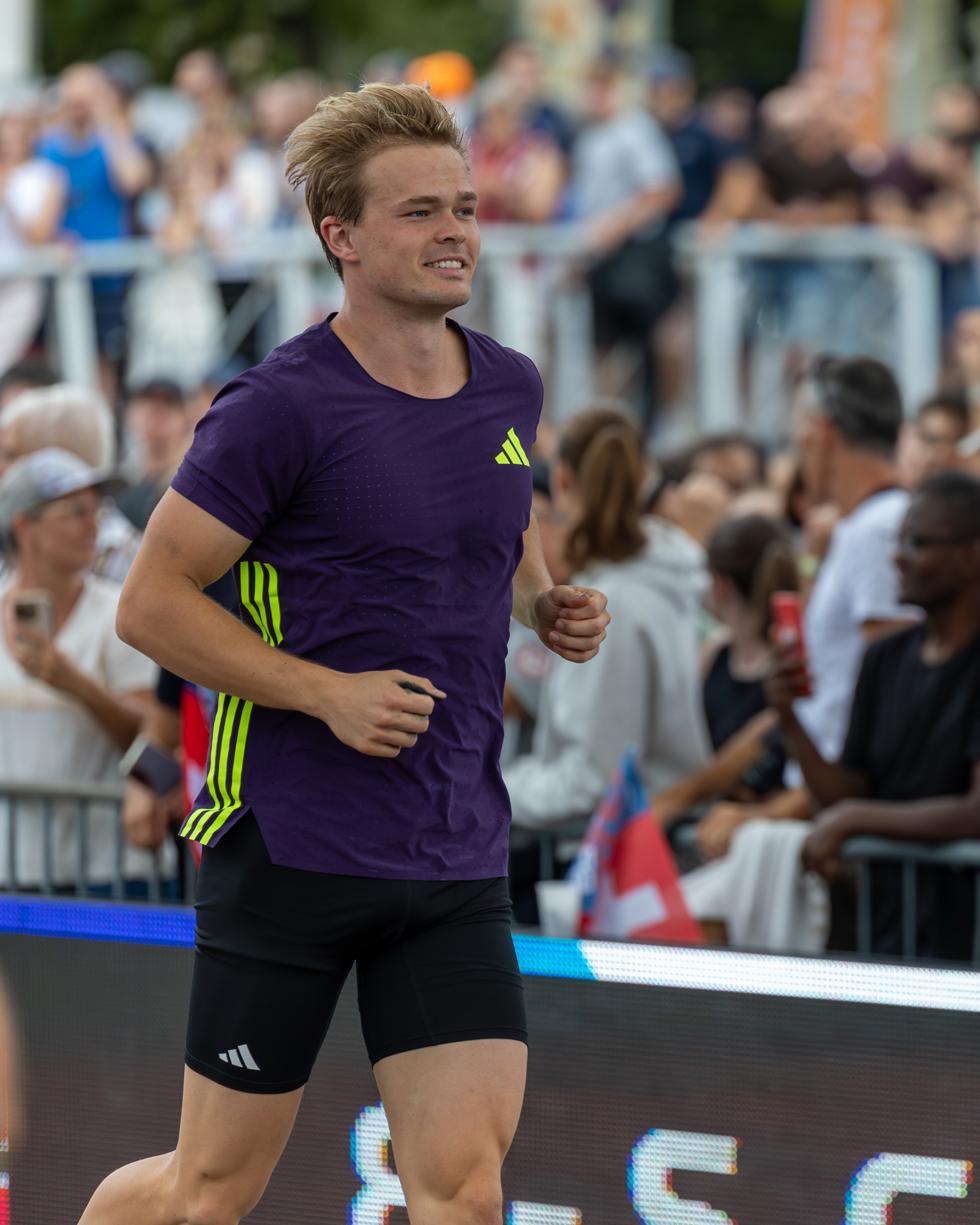
- Sondre Guttormsen at the 2026 Wanda Diamond League Athletissima athletics competition.

Personal information
- Nationality: Norwegian
- Born: 1 June 1999 (age 27) Davis, California, U.S.
- Height: 1.85 m (6 ft 1 in)
- Relative: Simen Guttormsen (brother)

Sport
- Country: Norway
- Sport: Track and field
- Event: Pole vault
- College team: Princeton Tigers
- Club: SK Vidar (2019–); Ski IL (–2018)
Medal record
Men's athletics
Representing Norway
World Ultimate Championship
Third place	2026 Budapest	Pole vault
European Indoor Championships
Gold medal – first place	2023 Istanbul	Pole vault
Bronze medal – third place	2025 Apeldoorn	Pole vault
European U23 Championships
Bronze medal – third place	2021 Tallinn	Pole vault
European U18 Championships
Bronze medal – third place	2016 Tbilisi	Pole vault

Sondre Guttormsen (born 1 June 1999) is a Norwegian athlete specialising in the pole vault. He is a European Indoor Championships gold and bronze medallist. Guttormsen won the gold medal at the 2023 European Indoor Championships and the bronze medal at the 2025 European Indoor Championships. He is also a European U23 Championships and European U18 Championships bronze medallist, three-time NCAA champion and four-time Norwegian national champion. Guttormsen is a two-time Olympian and competed at the 2020 and 2024 Summer Olympics. He is also the brother of Olympian Simen Guttormsen.

== Early life ==
Sondre Guttormsen was born the oldest of four children in Davis, California to Kristin and Atle Guttormsen. His father, a professor at the Norwegian University of Life Sciences, was studying for an economics Ph.D. at UC Davis. The family then returned to Ski, Norway.

== Career ==
Guttormsen competed for the University of California, Los Angeles in his first year of college and then transferred to Princeton University in 2020.

At the postponed 2020 Tokyo Olympics in 2021, the vaulter suffered a quad injury on his first attempt at 5.65 metres and did not qualify for the final.

With his 2022 NCAA Indoors title, Guttormsen became the first indoor NCAA individual champion for Princeton since 2002.

On 5 March 2023, the 23-year-old won the gold medal at the European Indoor Championships held in Istanbul, Turkey, the biggest success of his career up to that point. A few days later, he became only the ninth European to clear the six metre-mark indoors, set Norwegian outright record and equalled the collegiate record when winning his third NCAA title at the NCAA Division I Indoor T&F Championships.

== Statistics ==
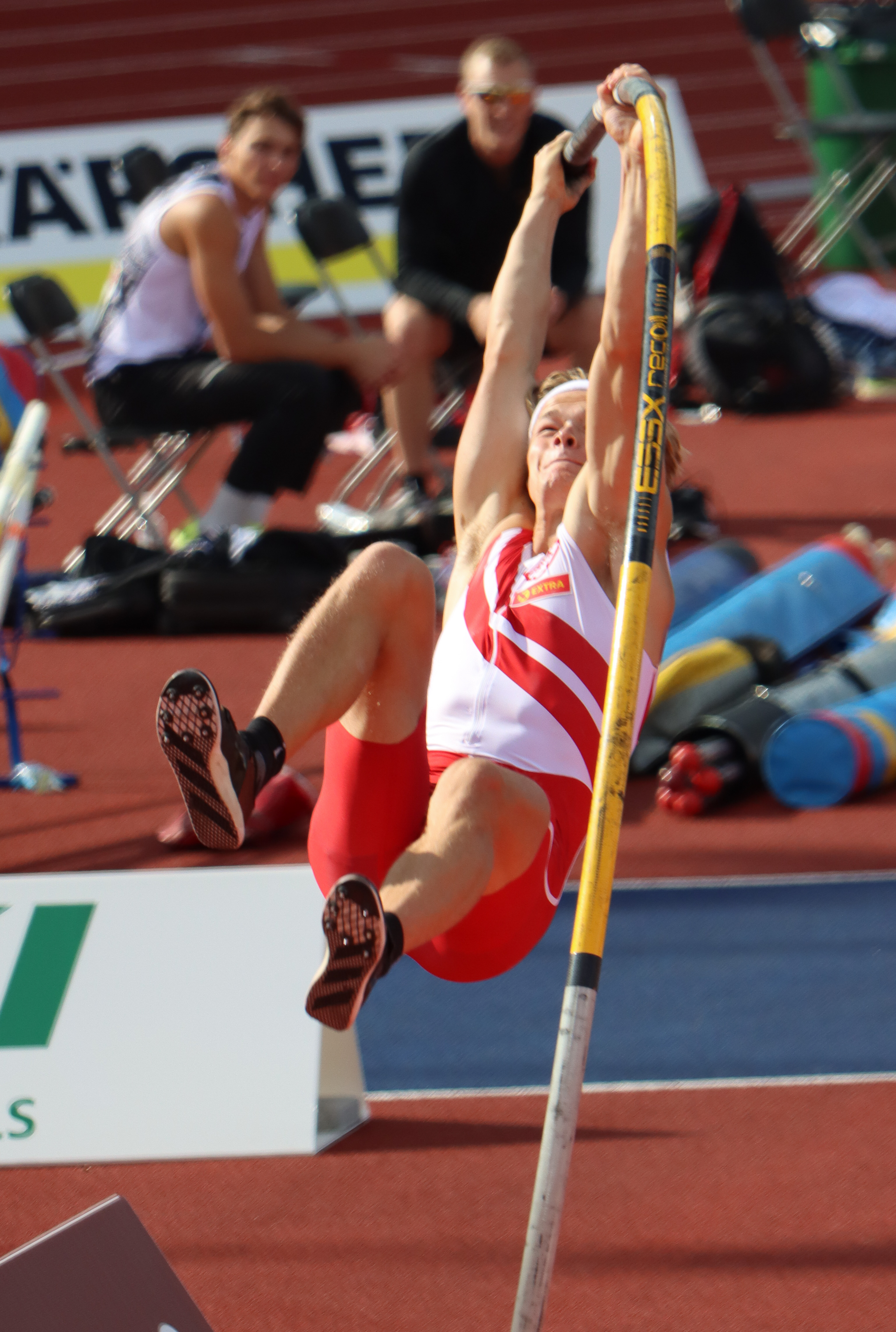
Guttormsen leaps at the 2020 BAUHAUS-galan meeting in Stockholm

=== Personal bests ===
- Pole vault – 6.00 m (19 ft 8 in) (Trondheim, NOR 2026) NR
  - Pole vault indoor – 6.06 m (19 ft 10 1/2 in) (Rouen, FRA 2026) NR

=== International competitions ===
Representing Norway
Year	Competition	Venue	Position	Event	Result
2016	European U18 Championships	Tbilisi, Georgia	3rd	Pole vault	5.05 PB
2017	European U20 Championships	Grosseto, Italy	6th	Pole vault	5.10
2018	World U20 Championships	Tampere, Finland	6th	Pole vault	5.40
2018	European Championships	Berlin, Germany	6th	Pole vault	5.75 NR
2019	European Indoor Championships	Glasgow, United Kingdom	6th	Pole vault	5.55
2019	European U23 Championships	Gävle, Sweden	4th	Pole vault	5.50
2019	European Team Championships 1st League	Sandnes, Norway	1st	Pole vault	5.51
2019	World Championships	Doha, Qatar	29th (q)	Pole vault	5.30
2021	European U23 Championships	Tallinn, Estonia	3rd	Pole vault	5.60
2021	Olympic Games	Tokyo, Japan	24th (q)	Pole vault	5.50
2022	World Indoor Championships	Belgrade, Serbia	8th	Pole vault	5.75
2022	World Championships	Eugene, OR, United States	10th	Pole vault	5.70
2022	European Championships	Munich, Germany	6th	Pole vault	5.75
2023	European Indoor Championships	Istanbul, Turkey	1st	Pole vault	5.80
2023	World Championships	Budapest, Hungary	20th (q)	Pole vault	5.55 m
2024	Olympic Games	Paris, France	8th	Pole vault	5.80 m
2025	European Indoor Championships	Apeldoorn, Netherlands	3rd	Pole vault	5.90 m
2025	World Indoor Championships	Nanjing, China	7th	Pole vault	5.70 m
2025	World Championships	Tokyo, Japan	6th	Pole vault	5.90 m
2026	World Indoor Championships	Toruń, Poland	4th	Pole vault	5.95 m
2026	European Championships	Birmingham, United Kingdom	6th	Pole vault	5.70 m
2026	World Ultimate Championship	Budapest, Hungary	3rd	Pole vault	5.95 m

=== NCAA titles ===
- NCAA Division I Men's Outdoor Track and Field Championships
  - Pole Vault: 2022
- NCAA Division I Men's Indoor Track and Field Championships
  - Pole Vault: 2022
  - Pole Vault: 2023

=== National titles ===
- Norwegian Athletics Championships
  - Pole Vault: 2018, 2019, 2020
- Norwegian Indoor Athletics Championships
  - 60 metres hurdles: 2017
