= Sam Kendricks =

American pole vaulter (born 1992)

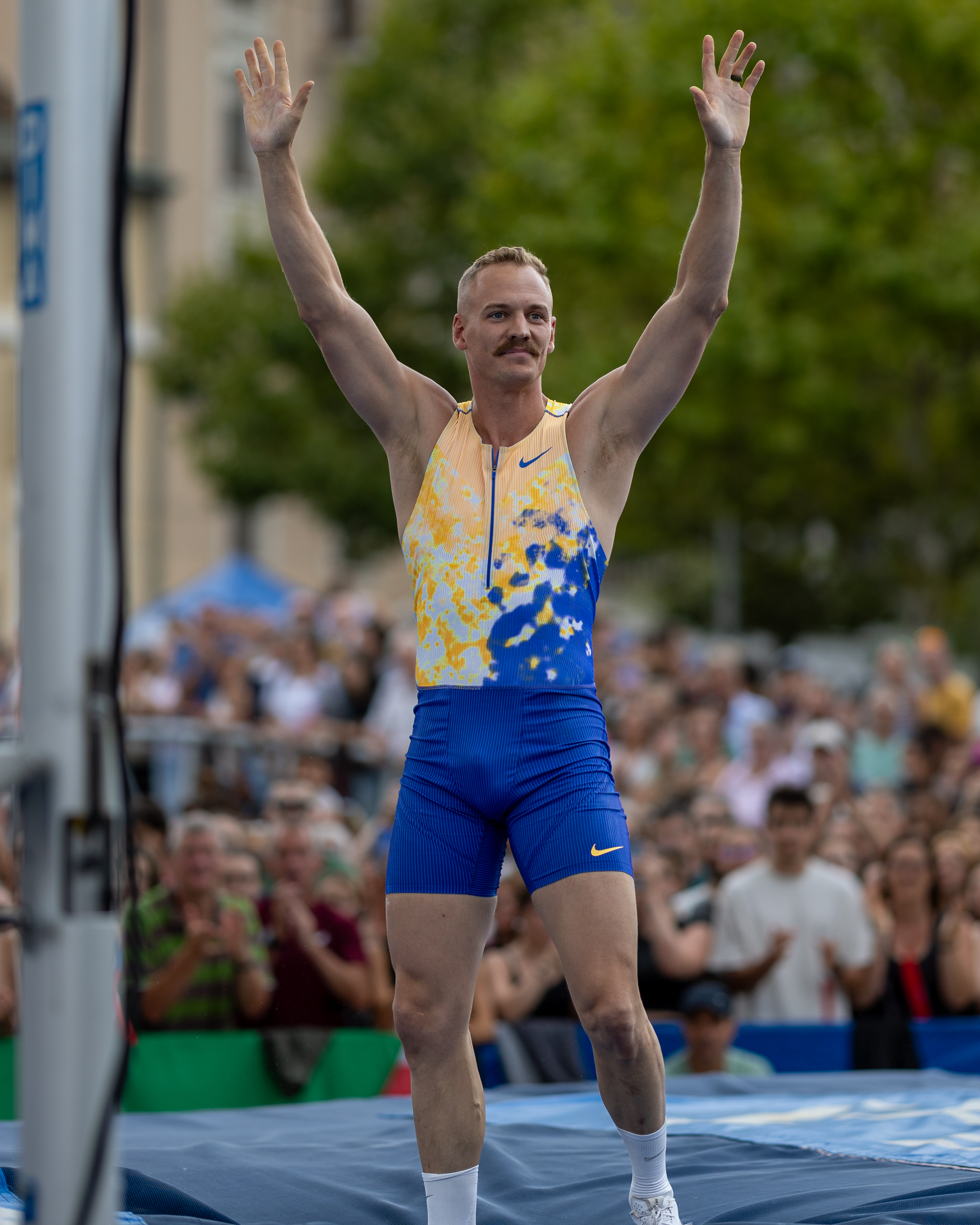
- Kendricks at the 2026 Athletissima, Diamond League

Personal information
- Nationality: American
- Born: Samuel Hathorn Kendricks; September 7, 1992 (age 34) Oceanside, California, U.S.
- Home town: Oxford, Mississippi, U.S.
- Height: 6 ft 1 in (185 cm)
- Weight: 175 lb (79 kg)

Sport
- Country: United States
- Sport: Track and field
- Event: Pole vault
- College team: University of Mississippi
- Club: Nike; U.S. Army; UST-ESSX
- Turned pro: 2014

Achievements and titles
- Personal bests: Pole vault: Outdoor; 6.06 m (19 ft 10 1/2 in) (Des Moines 2019): Indoor; 6.01 m (19 ft 8 1/2 in) (Rouen 2020)
Medal record
Men's athletics
Representing the United States
Olympic Games
Silver medal – second place	2024 Paris	Pole vault
Bronze medal – third place	2016 Rio de Janeiro	Pole vault
World Championships
Gold medal – first place	2017 London	Pole vault
Gold medal – first place	2019 Doha	Pole vault
World Indoor Championships
Silver medal – second place	2016 Portland	Pole vault
Silver medal – second place	2018 Birmingham	Pole vault
Silver medal – second place	2024 Glasgow	Pole vault
Bronze medal – third place	2025 Nanjing	Pole vault
Diamond League
First place	2017	Pole vault
First place	2019	Pole vault
Summer Universiade
Gold medal – first place	2013 Kazan	Pole vault
Continental Cup
Gold medal – first place	2018 Ostrava	Pole vault

Samuel Hathorn Kendricks (born September 7, 1992) is an American pole vaulter. He is a three-time indoor and six-time outdoor national champion (2014–2019), the 2016 Olympics bronze and 2024 Olympics silver medalist, and the 2017 and 2019 World Champion. In 2019, Kendricks set the American pole vault record at 6.06 m, tying him with Steve Hooker for sixth all time. He later won the gold medal at the World Championships in Doha.

== Early life ==
Kendricks vaulted for Oxford High School in his hometown of Oxford, Mississippi, leading his team to the 2009 MHSAA 5A State Championship. He vaulted 17 ft 0 in (5.18 m) to set the then-state record, later broken in 2023 by his brother John Scott with a vault of 17 ft 1 in (5.2 m). Sam won the state meet outdoors in 2010 and 2011, and indoors in 2011. He also lettered in cross country and soccer. In 2011, he was named the Gatorade boys' high school track and field athlete of the year for Mississippi.

== NCAA ==
While vaulting for the University of Mississippi, Kendricks won the 2013 and 2014 NCAA Championships. He broke both Ole Miss Rebels pole vault records as a freshman. Kendricks announced that he would be turning pro in 2014.

== Professional ==
=== 2015 ===
Kendricks set his personal best of 5.86 m (19 ft 2 1/2 in) at the indoor 2015 Reno Pole Vault Summit. Kendrick uses a hand hold at 15 ft 5 in (4.69 m) and from his performance in Reno claims the "Push-off" World Record at 4 ft 6 in (1.37 m). He won the men's pole vault at 2015 US Outdoor Championships in 5.75 m (18 ft 10 1/4 in). He won the prelims of the 2015 World Championships in Athletics – Men's pole vault and finished 9th in 5.65 m (18 ft 6 1/4 in).

=== 2016 ===
After setting a personal best outdoors at the IAAF World Challenge in Beijing, at 5.92 m (19 ft 5 in) Kendricks won the US Olympic Trials at 5.91 m (19 ft 4 1/2 in). At the 2016 Summer Olympics, he won the bronze medal. Kendricks also garnered attention during the Olympics when he stopped mid run during a pole vault attempt to stand at attention while "The Star-Spangled Banner" was played.

=== 2017 ===
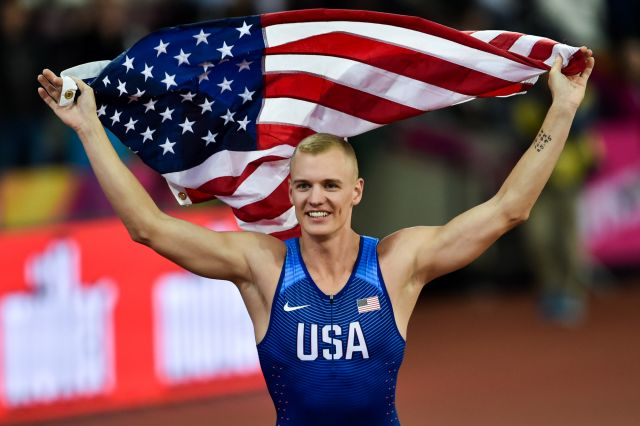
Kendricks celebrates winning the 2017 World Championship title in London, England, UK.

On June 24, 2017, Kendricks became the 22nd person to join the six meters club by vaulting exactly 6.00 m (19 ft 8 in) while winning the 2017 USA Outdoor Track and Field Championships in Sacramento, California.

=== 2019 ===
On July 27, 2019, Kendricks set the American pole vault record by jumping 6.06 m.

=== 2021 ===
Kendricks placed second in the US Olympic trials at 5.91 m (19 ft 4 3/4 in) tied with KC Lightfoot, however, he was tested positive for COVID-19 in the Olympic Village, and had to withdraw from the 2020 Summer Olympics as a result, missing the pole vault competition.

=== 2024 ===
Leading up to the 2024 U.S. Olympic trials final Kendricks stated that he might be inclined to forgo the 2024 Olympics after his "bitter" experience from Tokyo 2020 when he claimed that his positive COVID-19 test had been a false positive and the USOC had done nothing to fight on his behalf. On June 23, 2024, he won his 7th outdoor (11th overall) U.S. National Pole Vault championship by clearing 5.92 m (19 ft 5 in) and earned an automatic bid for the Olympics. Shortly after the competition was over he confirmed that he would be going to Paris after all. In the 2024 Olympic Men's Pole Vault final he claimed the Silver Medal for Team USA by clearing a height of 5.95 m (19 ft 6 1/4 in). He was bested by Armand "Mondo" Duplantis who set a new world record at 6.25 m (20 ft 6 in).

== Personal life ==
Kendricks is the son of Scott and Marni Kendricks; his father is also one of his coaches. He has a twin brother, Tom.

On December 29, 2017, Kendricks married Leanne Zimmer in Oxford, Mississippi.

As of 2024, Kendricks is a member of the United States Army Reserve.

== Competition record ==
Year	Competition	Venue	Position	Notes
Representing United States
2013	Summer Universiade	Kazan, Russia	1st	5.60
2015	World Championships	Beijing, China	9th	5.65
2016	World Indoor Championships	Portland, Oregon	2nd	5.80
2016	Summer Olympics	Rio de Janeiro, Brazil	3rd	5.85
2017	World Championships	London, United Kingdom	1st	5.95
2017	DécaNation	Angers, France	1st	5.75
2018	World Indoor Championships	Birmingham, United Kingdom	2nd	5.85
2019	World Championships	Doha, Qatar	1st	5.97
2024	World Indoor Championships	Glasgow, United Kingdom	2nd	5.90
2024	Summer Olympics	Paris, France	2nd	5.95
2025	World Indoor Championships	Nanjing, China	3rd	5.90
2025	World Championships	Tokyo, Japan	4th	5.95
2026	World Ultimate Championship	Budapest, Hungary	6th	5.80

== See also ==
- 6 metres club
