= Charlie Myers (athlete) =

British athlete

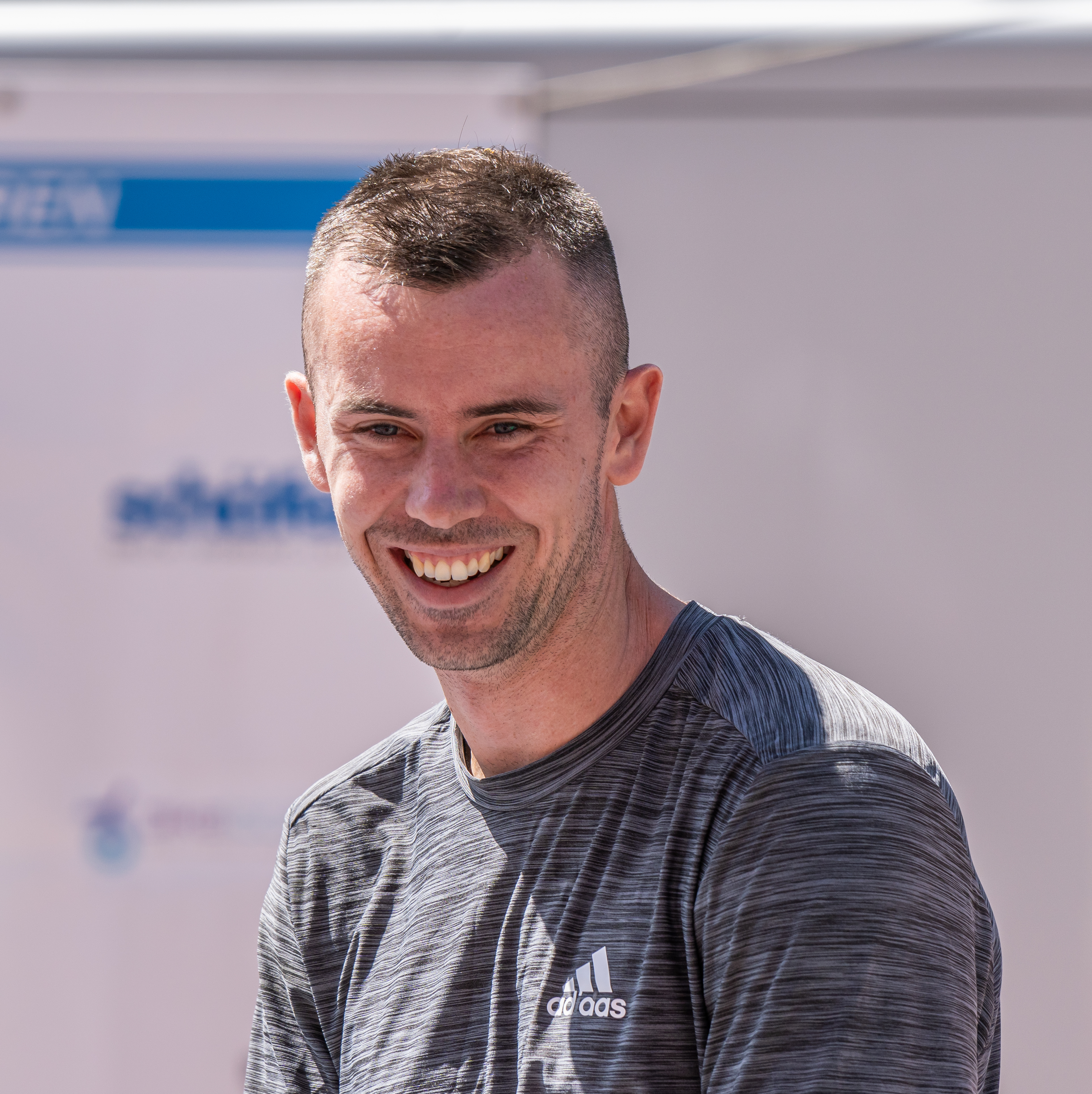
- Myers in Hof (Saale) (2025)

Personal information
- Nationality: British (English)
- Born: 12 June 1997 (age 29)

Sport
- Sport: Track and field
- Event: Pole vault
- Club: Birtley AC
Medal record
Representing England
British Championships
Gold medal – first place	2018 Birmingham	pole vault
Gold medal – first place	2023 Manchester	pole vault

Charlie Myers (born 12 June 1997) is a British athlete specialising in the pole vault. In 2023, he became the British champion in pole vault for the second time.

== Biography ==
Myers became the British champion in 2018, after winning the gold medal at the pole vault at the 2018 British Athletics Championships, held in Birmingham. He was representing Middlesbrough AC at the time.

He represented Great Britain at the 2018 European Athletics Championships, 2018 Athletics World Cup and the 2021 European Athletics Indoor Championships in Toruń, Poland.

In February 2023, he won the 2023 British Indoor Athletics Championships title and then in July, he won his second British title at the 2023 British Athletics Championships, held in Manchester.
