= David Holý =

Czech athlete (born 1998)

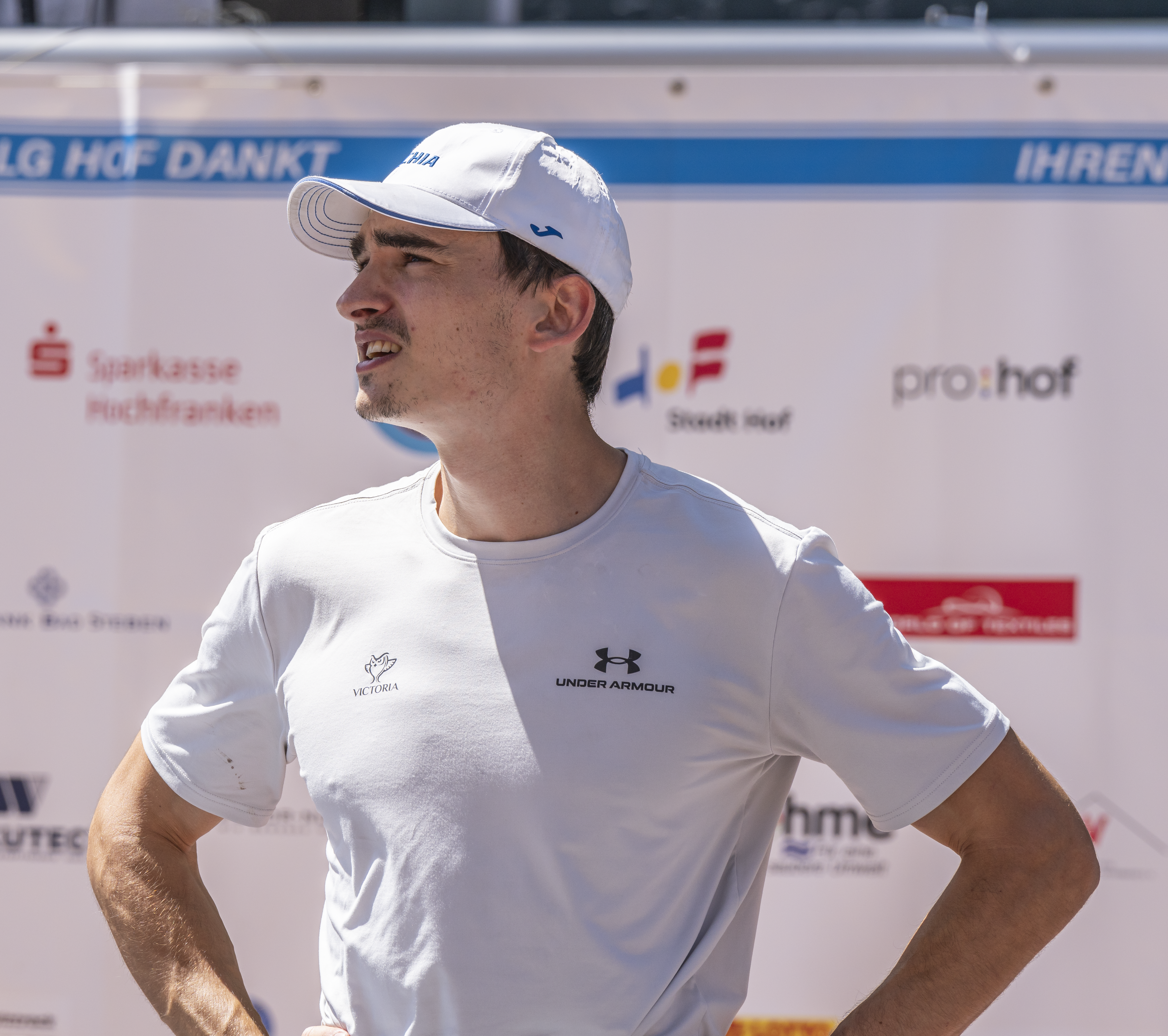
- Holý in Hof (Saale) (2025)

Personal information
- Nationality: Czech
- Born: 4 March 1998 (age 28) Chrudim, Czech Republic

Sport
- Sport: Athletics
- Event: Pole vault

Achievements and titles
- Personal bests: Pole Vault: 5.76 m (Ostrava, 2026)

David Holý (born 4 March 1998) is a Czech pole vaulter. He has won national titles both indoors and outdoors. He has competed for the Czech Republic at multiple major championships, including the 2024 Olympic Games in Paris.

== Early life ==
Holý was born on 4 March 1998 in Chrudim. A keen footballer in his youth, he attended school in Chrudim before attending college in Hradec Králové.

== Biography ==
Holý is a member of Athletics Chrudim. He is coached by Czech former Olympic pole vaulter Zdeněk Lubenský. He won the Czech Indoor Athletics Championships national title for the first time in February 2023 in Ostrava. Holý then won the Czech Athletics Championships title outdoors in July 2023 in Tibor.

Holý was a runner-up at the Czech indoor national championships in February 2024 in Ostrava to Matěj Ščerba. He qualified for the final and placed twelfth overall at the 2024 European Athletics Championships in Rome. Holý placed third at the Czech Athletics Championships in June 2024, in Zlín. Holý competed in the pole vault at the 2024 Summer Olympics in Paris, France, where he cleared 5.60 metres but did not qualify for the final.

He was runner-up to Ščerba at the Czech Indoor Athletics Championships in February 2025, clearing 5.49 metres in Ostrava. He was later selected for the 2025 European Athletics Indoor Championships in Appeldoorn, Netherlands. He cleared a new personal best height of 5.75 metres to qualify for the final. In the final, he cleared 5.70 metres to finish in eighth place overall.

Holý competed at the 2025 World Athletics Championships in Tokyo, Japan, in September 2025, without advancing to the final.

On 28 February, he cleared 5.76 metres to win the 2026 Czech Indoor Athletics Championships. Holý place twelfth competing at the 2026 World Athletics Indoor Championships in Toruń, Poland. During the competition his pole accidentally struck Brazilian heptathlon competitor José Fernando Ferreira as he ran the heptathlon 1000 metres, although Ferreira was able to get up and continue his race. In August 2026, he competed at the 2026 European Athletics Championships in Birmingham, England.
