= Matěj Ščerba =

Czech athlete (born 1998)

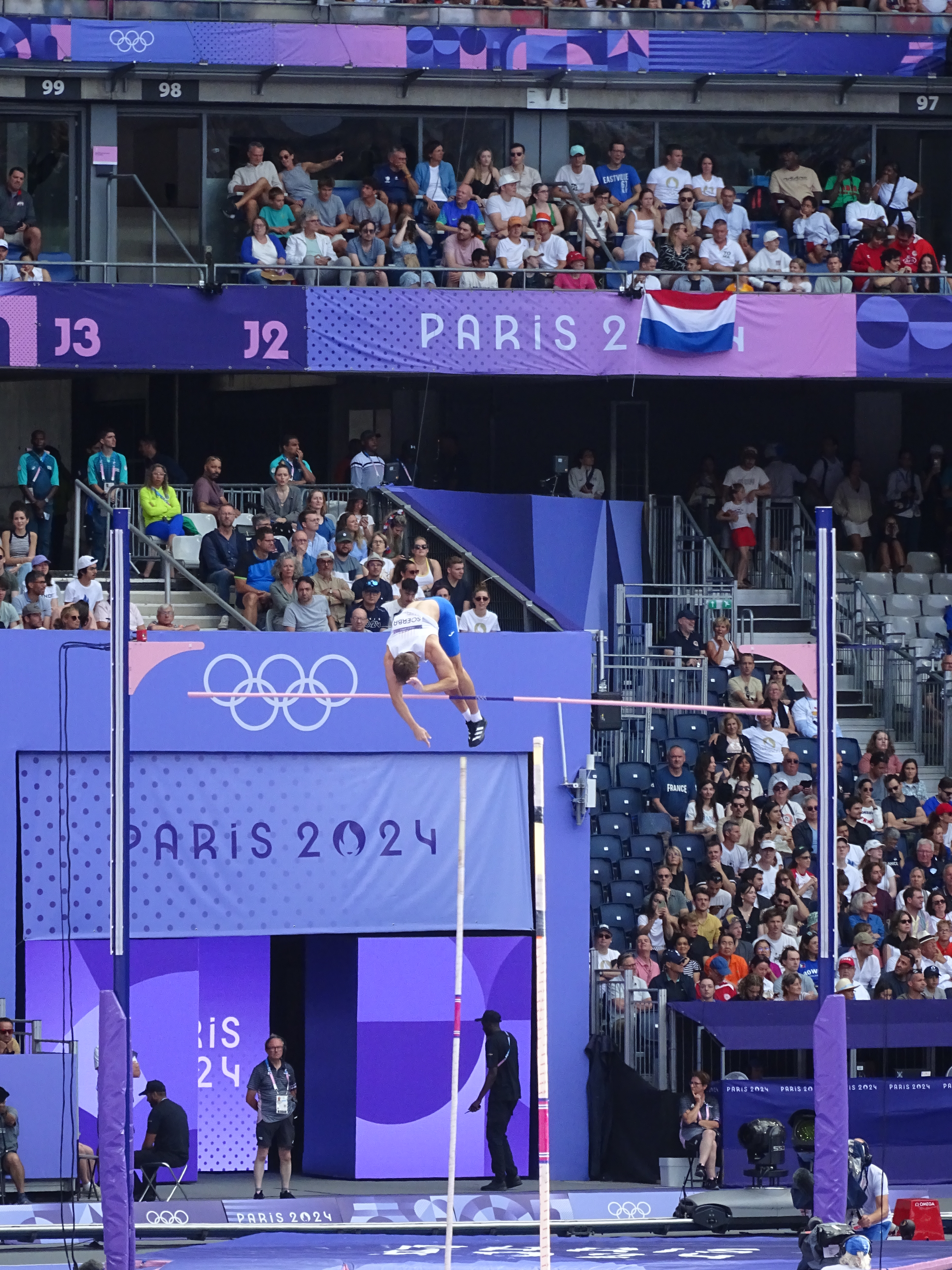

Personal information
- Nationality: Czech
- Born: 9 December 1998 (age 27) Ústí nad Labem, Czech Republic

Sport
- Sport: Athletics
- Event: Pole vault

Achievements and titles
- Personal bests: Pole Vault: 5.70 m (Madrid, 2025)
Medal record
Men's athletics
Representing Czech Republic
European Team Championships
Bronze medal – third place	2025 Madrid	Pole vault

Matěj Ščerba (born 9 December 1998) is a Czech pole vaulter. He has won Czech national titles in the pole vault both indoors and outdoors and competed at the 2024 Olympic Games.

== Early life ==
Ščerba was born on 9 December 1998 in Ústí nad Labem. He initially played hockey before trying athletics because his cousin did it. He did not try pole vault straight away but tried it when he was older. His first major success was a junior title in Třinec in 2016.

== Career ==
He is coached by Czech former Olympic pole vaulter Zdeněk Lubenský. He won the Czech indoor national title in March 2022 in Ostrava. He finished third at the Czech Indoor Athletics Championships in February 2023 in Ostrava. He was runner-up for the Czech national title at the Czech Athletics Championships in July 2023, in Tábor.

He won the Czech indoor national title for a second time in February 2024 in Ostrava. On 4 June 2024, he set a new personal best height of 5.66 metres, whilst competing in Prague. He qualified for the final and placed tenth overall at the 2024 European Athletics Championships in Rome, Italy. He won the Czech outdoor national title for the first time in June 2024 in Zlín, recording a personal best height of 5.67 metres. He qualified through ranking and competed in the pole vault at the 2024 Paris Olympics, where he cleared 5.40 metres but did not progress to the final. He was named the Athlete of the Ústí nad Labem 2024 in a ceremony held in February 2025.

He won his third Czech national indoor title in February 2025, clearing 5.62 metres in Ostrava. He was selected for the 2025 European Athletics Indoor Championships in Appeldoorn, Netherlands, where he cleared 5.45 metres but did not progress to the final. He competed at the 2025 European Athletics Team Championships First Division in Madrid, where he cleared a lifetime best of 5.70 metres.

Ščerba competed at the 2025 World Athletics Championships in Tokyo, Japan, in September 2025, without advancing to the final.
