= Urho Kujanpää =

Finnish track and field athlete

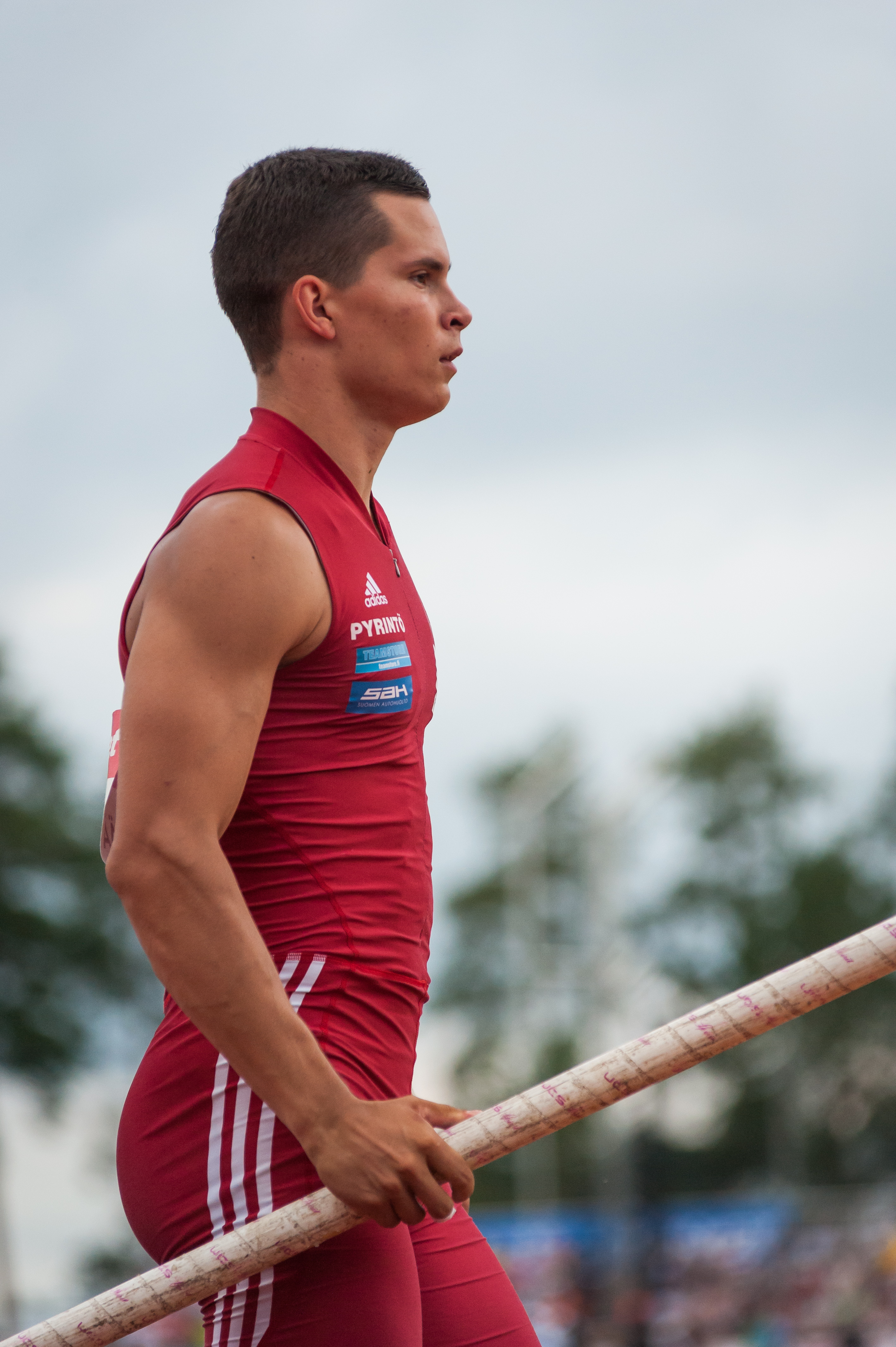
- Urho Kujanpää in 2018

Personal information
- Born: 18 May 1997 (age 29) Ylöjärvi

Sport
- Country: Finland
- Sport: Athletics
- Event: Pole vault

Achievements and titles
- Personal best: Pole vault: 5.65 (2021)
Medal record
Summer World University Games
Gold medal – first place	2021 Chengdu	Pole vault

Urho Kujanpää (born 18 May 1997) is a Finnish track and field athlete.

He won a gold medal in the pole vault at the 2021 Summer World University Games.
