= 2019 French Indoor Athletics Championships =

- Dates: 16–17 February
- Host city: Miramas
- Venue: Stadium Miramas Métropole
- Events: 28

The 2019 French Indoor Athletics Championships was the 48th edition of the national championship in indoor track and field for France. It was held on 16–17 February at the Stadium Miramas Métropole in Miramas, Bouches-du-Rhône. A total of 28 events (divided evenly between the sexes) were contested over the two-day competition.

== Results ==
=== Men ===
Event	Gold		Silver		Bronze	
60 metres	Marvin René	6.63	Jérémy Leroux	6.70	Méba-Mickaël Zézé	6.72
200 metres	Stuart Dutamby	20.84	Ismail Bedel	21.21	Gautier Dautremer	21.27
400 metres	Fabrisio Saïdy	46.67	Mame-Ibra Anne	46.92	Thomas Jordier	47.18
800 metres	Nasredine Khatir	1:50.07	Aymeric Lusine	1:50.62	Clément Dhainaut	1:50.79
1500 metres	Samir Dahmani	3:44.99	Djilali Bedrani	3:45.31	Pierrick Jocteur-Monrozier	3:45.64
3000 metres	Djilali Bedrani	7:51.42	Jimmy Gressier	7:51.08	Yoann Kowal	7:52.46
5000 m walk	Gabriel Bordier	19:22.46	David Kuster	19:58.45	Fabian Fesselier	21:01.66
60 m hurdles	Pascal Martinot-Lagarde	7.52	Aurel Manga	7.57	Wilhem Belocian	7.63
High jump	Matthieu Tomassi	2.15 m	Quentin Pladys	2.12 m	Raphaël Moudoulou	2.12 m
Pole vault	Axel Chapelle	5.50 m	Baptiste Boirie	5.50 m	Mathieu Collet Ethan Cormont Alioune Sene	5.35 m
Long jump	Jean-Pierre Bertrand	8.04 m	Augustin Bey	7.71 m	Cédric Dufag	7.67 m
Triple jump	Yoann Rapinier	16.68 m	Kevin Luron	16.60 m	Harold Correa	16.36 m
Shot put	Frédéric Dagée	19.99 m	Antoine Duponchel	18.57 m	Jordan Guehaseim	17.07 m
Heptathlon	Basile Rolnin	6025 pts	Bastien Auzeil	5805 pts	Jérémy Lelièvre	5796 pts

=== Women ===
Event	Gold		Silver		Bronze	
60 metres	Nasrane Bacar	7.39	Sarah Richard Mingas	7.40	Caroline Chaillou	7.41
200 metres	Maroussia Paré	23.45	Caroline Chaillou	23.77	Elise Trynkler	23.94
400 metres	Déborah Sananes	52.53	Agnès Raharolahy	52.57	Amandine Brossier	52.77
800 metres	Charlotte Pizzo	2:04.87	Corane Gazeau	2:05.53	Anaïs Seiller	2:07.21
1500 metres	Ophélie Claude-Boxberger	4:15.86	Elodie Normand	4:17.05	Alice Finot	4:18.45
3000 metres	Ophélie Claude-Boxberger	9:10.78	Marie Bouchard	9:15.82	Claire Perraux	9:21.04
3000 m walk	Clémence Beretta	12:58.35	Marine Quennehen	13:17.84	Loanie Cellard	13:35.36
60 m hurdles	Sacha Alessandrini	8.02	Pauline Lett	8.20	Cindy Billaud	8.22
High jump	Prisca Duvernay	1.88 m	Alizée Larochelle	1.83 m	Marine Vallet Laura Salin-Eyike	1.80 m
Pole vault	Ninon Guillon-Romarin	4.60 m	Marion Lotout	4.40 m	Alice Moindrot	4.40 m
Long jump	Hilary Kpatcha	6.47 m	Tiphaine Mauchant	6.36 m	Marie-Jeanne Ourega	6.16 m
Triple jump	Rouguy Diallo	14.15 m	Jeanine Assani Issouf	13.98 m	Sokhna Galle	13.63 m
Shot put	Ashley Bologna	16.78 m	Jessica Cérival	16.33 m	Rose-Sharon Pierre-Louis	16.11 m
Pentathlon	Solène Ndama	4672 pts	Esther Turpin	4320 pts	Diane Marie-Hardy	4319 pts
