= 2011 World Youth Championships in Athletics – Boys' pole vault =

Boys' pole vault at the 2011 World Youth Championships in Athletics
- Venue: Stadium Lille Métropole
- Dates: 8 July (qualification); 10 July (final)
- Competitors: 28
- Winning height: 5.25 PB

Medalists
gold medal	Robert Renner	Slovenia
silver medal	Melker Svärd Jacobsson	Sweden
bronze medal	Jacob Blankenship	United States

The boys' pole vault at the 2011 World Youth Championships in Athletics was held at the Stadium Lille Métropole on 8 and 10 July.

== Medalists ==
Gold	Silver	Bronze
Robert Renner; Slovenia	Melker Svärd Jacobsson; Sweden	Jacob Blankenship; United States

== Records ==
Prior to the competition, the following records were as follows.

World Youth Best	Germán Chiaraviglio (ARG)	5.51	Porto Alegre, Brazil	1 May 2004
Championship Record	Nico Weiler (GER)	5.26	Ostrava, Czech Republic	15 July 2007
World Youth Leading	Heorhiy Bykov (UKR)	5.35	Kyiv, Ukraine	18 June 2011

== Qualification ==
Qualification rule: qualification standard 4.85 m or at least best 12 qualified.

=== Group A ===
Rank	Name	Nationality	4.35	4.50	4.60	4.70	4.80	4.85	Result	Notes
1	Robert Renner	Slovenia	–	–	o	–	o		4.80	q
1	Daniel Gardner	Great Britain	–	o	o	o	o		4.80	q, PB
3	Lukas Hallanzy	Germany	–	–	o	xo	o		4.80	q
4	Nicholas Southgate	New Zealand	–	xo	–	xo	o		4.80	q
5	Brodie Cross	Australia	–	–	o	o	xxo		4.80	q
6	Heorhiy Bykov	Ukraine	–	–	–	o	–		4.70	q
7	Ryohei Noda	Japan	–	–	–	o	xxx		4.70	q
8	Mateusz Jerzy	Poland	–	xo	–	o	xxx		4.70	
9	Alessandro Sinno	Italy	–	o	xxo	xo	xxx		4.70	
10	Etamar Bhastekar	Israel	o	xxo	xxx				4.50	PB
11	Apostolos Kousinas	Greece	xo	xxx					4.35	
	Shota Enoki	Japan	–	–	xxx				NM	
	Pascal Kethers	New Zealand	xxx						NM	
	Karol Pawlik	Poland	–	xxx					NM	

=== Group B ===
Rank	Name	Nationality	4.35	4.50	4.60	4.70	4.80	4.85	Result	Notes
1	Jacob Blankenship	United States	–	–	o	o	o		4.80	q
1	Oleg Zernikel	Germany	–	–	o	o	o		4.80	q
3	Melker Svärd Jacobsson	Sweden	–	–	–	–	xo		4.80	q
3	Lukas Wirth	Austria	–	–	o	o	xo		4.80	q, PB
5	Medhi Amar Rouana	France	–	o	–	o	–		4.70	q
6	Viktor Östman	Finland	o	xo	xo	o	xxx		4.70	
7	Anders Andréasson	Sweden	–	–	o	xxo	xxx		4.70	SB
7	Marc Vela	Spain	–	o	–	xxo	xxx		4.70	
9	Rowan May	Great Britain	xo	o	xxx				4.50	
10	Kristjan Rosenberg	Estonia	xxo	o	xxx				4.50	
11	Javier Alcácer	Spain	o	xo	xxx				4.50	
	Benjamin Bertrand	France	xxx						NM	
	Eirik Greibrokk Dolve	Denmark	xxx						NM	
	Matthias Freinberger	Austria	xxx						NM	

== Final ==
Rank	Name	Nationality	4.65	4.80	4.95	5.05	5.15	5.20	5.25	5.31	Result	Notes
1st place, gold medalist(s)	Robert Renner	Slovenia	o	xo	o	o	xo	o	o	xxx	5.25	PB
2nd place, silver medalist(s)	Melker Svärd Jacobsson	Sweden	–	–	–	o	xo	–	xxx		5.15	
3rd place, bronze medalist(s)	Jacob Blankenship	United States	–	o	o	o	xxx				5.05	
4	Nicholas Southgate	New Zealand	o	o	xxx						4.80	
4	Heorhiy Bykov	Ukraine	–	o	–	xxx					4.80	
4	Oleg Zernikel	Germany	o	o	xxx						4.80	
7	Lukas Hallanzy	Germany	xo	o	xxx						4.80	
8	Daniel Gardner	Great Britain	xxo	o	xxx						4.80	PB
9	Brodie Cross	Australia	o	xo	xxx						4.80	
9	Lukas Wirth	Austria	o	xo	xxx						4.80	PB
9	Ryohei Noda	Japan	o	xo	xxx						4.80	
12	Medhi Amar Rouana	France	xxo	–	xxx						4.65	
