= 2018 IAAF World Indoor Championships – Men's pole vault =

Men's pole vault at the 2018 IAAF World Indoor Championships
- Venue: Arena Birmingham
- Dates: 4 March
- Competitors: 15 from 10 nations
- Winning height: 5.90

Medalists
gold medal	Renaud Lavillenie	France
silver medal	Sam Kendricks	United States
bronze medal	Piotr Lisek	Poland

The men's pole vault at the 2018 IAAF World Indoor Championships took place on 4 March 2018.

== Summary ==
Only 15 competitors meant only a final was held. Several notable names were eliminated early on; 2015 World Champion Shawnacy Barber; 2016 Olympic champion Thiago Braz da Silva; world junior record holder Armand Duplantis; 2014 World Indoor Champion Konstantinos Filippidis; 2011 World Champion Paweł Wojciechowski; and 2013 World Champion Raphael Holzdeppe. Young newcomers Kurtis Marschall and Emmanouil Karalis cleared personal bests of 5.80m to be among the last contenders. The medalists were decided by a first attempt clearance at 5.85m, by Piotr Lisek, Sam Kendricks and Renaud Lavillenie. At that point, Lavillenie was still clean placing him in first place, Kendricks had one miss for second and Lisek had two misses for third. Six other vaulters had attempts left, many strategically passing to 5.90m after the clearances, but none were able to clear another height. In fact, only Lavillenie was able to get over 5.90 m (19 ft 4 1/4 in) on his second attempt, confirming his win. Kendricks took one attempt for the win at 5.95m but in the end the podium in 2018 was exactly the same as in 2016.

== Records ==
Standing records prior to the 2018 IAAF World Indoor Championships
World indoor record	Renaud Lavillenie (FRA)	6.16	Donetsk, Ukraine	15 February 2014
Championship record	Renaud Lavillenie (FRA)	6.02	Portland, United States	17 March 2016
World Leading	Renaud Lavillenie (FRA)	5.93	Clermont-Ferrand, France	25 February 2018
World Leading	Sam Kendricks (USA)	5.93	Clermont-Ferrand, France	25 February 2018

== Schedule ==
Date	Time	Round
4 March 2018	15:00	Final

== Results ==
The final was started at 15:00.

Rank	Name	Nationality	5.45	5.60	5.70	5.80	5.85	5.90	5.95	6.00	Result	Notes
1st place, gold medalist(s)	Renaud Lavillenie	France	–	–	o	–	o	xo	–	xxx	5.90	
2nd place, silver medalist(s)	Sam Kendricks	United States	o	o	o	x–	o	xx–	x		5.85	
3rd place, bronze medalist(s)	Piotr Lisek	Poland	–	xo	–	x–	o	xxx			5.85	
4	Kurtis Marschall	Australia	xo	o	o	o	x–	xx			5.80	PB
5	Emmanouil Karalis	Greece	xo	o	xo	o	x–	xx			5.80	PB
5	Raphael Holzdeppe	Germany	o	xo	xo	o	x–	xx			5.80	
7	Konstantinos Filippidis	Greece	xo	o	o	x–	xx				5.70	
8	Armand Duplantis	Sweden	o	xo	o	x–	x–	x			5.70	
9	Melker Svärd Jacobsson	Sweden	o	xxo	xo	xx–	x				5.70	
10	Axel Chapelle	France	o	o	xxx						5.60	
11	Xue Changrui	China	o	xo	xxx						5.60	
12	Thiago Braz da Silva	Brazil	–	xxo	–	xxx					5.60	
13	Scott Houston	United States	xo	xxo	xxx						5.60	
13	Paweł Wojciechowski	Poland	xo	xxo	xxx						5.60	
15	Shawnacy Barber	Canada	o	xxx							5.45	
