= Track and field at the 2015 Military World Games – Men's pole vault =

The men's pole vault event at the 2015 Military World Games was held on 8 October at the KAFAC Sports Complex.

== Records ==
Prior to this competition, the existing world and CISM record were as follows:

World Record	Renaud Lavillenie (FRA)	6.16	Donetsk, Ukraine	15 February 2014
CISM World Record	Paweł Wojciechowski (POL)	5.81	Rio de Janeiro, Brazil	23 July 2011

== Schedule ==
Date	Time	Round
8 October 2015	13:00	Final

== Medalists ==
Gold	Silver	Bronze
Jin Min-sub; South Korea	Georgiy Gorokhov; Russia	Paweł Wojciechowski; Poland

== Results ==
=== Final ===
Rank	Athlete	Nationality	4.70	4.85	5.00	5.10	5.20	5.30	5.40	5.50	5.60	5.70	Mark	Notes
1st place, gold medalist(s)	Jin Min-sub	South Korea	-	-	o	-	o	-	xxo	-	-	x-	5.40	
2nd place, silver medalist(s)	Georgiy Gorokhov	Russia	-	-	-	-	-	xo	xxx				5.30	
3rd place, bronze medalist(s)	Paweł Wojciechowski	Poland	-	-	o	-	o	-	xxx				5.20	
	Marquis Richards	Switzerland	-	-	xxx								NM	
	Nkosinathi Green Zwane	Swaziland	-	-	x-								NM	
	Rong Yunlei	China											DNS	
