= 2017 European Athletics U23 Championships – Men's pole vault =

The men's pole vault event at the 2017 European Athletics U23 Championships was held in Bydgoszcz, Poland, at Zdzisław Krzyszkowiak Stadium on 14 and 16 July.

== Medalists ==
Gold	Ben Broeders; Belgium
Silver	Axel Chapelle; France
Bronze	Adrián Vallés; Spain

== Results ==
=== Qualification ===
14 July

Qualification rule: 5.35 (Q) or the 12 best results (q) qualified for the final.

Rank	Group	Name	Nationality	4.85	5.00	5.15	5.25	Results	Notes
1	A	Eirik Greibrokk Dolve	Norway	–	o	o	o	5.25	q
1	A	Tomas Wecksten	Finland	–	o	o	o	5.25	q
1	B	Ben Broeders	Belgium	–	–	o	o	5.25	q
1	B	Matteo Cristoforo Capello	Italy	–	–	o	o	5.25	q, =SB
5	A	Axel Chapelle	France	–	–	xo	o	5.25	q
5	B	Tommi Holttinen	Finland	–	o	xo	o	5.25	q, =SB
7	A	Oleg Zernikel	Germany	–	xo	xo	o	5.25	q
8	B	Aleix Pi	Spain	xxo	o	xo	o	5.25	q, =SB
9	A	Luigi Robert Colella	Italy	o	o	o	xo	5.25	q
9	A	Charlie Myers	Great Britain	–	–	o	xo	5.25	q
9	B	Adrián Vallés	Spain	–	–	–	xo	5.25	q
12	B	Mathieu Collet	France	–	–	xxo	xo	5.25	q
13	B	Borys Dżaman	Poland	–	xo	o	xxx	5.15	
14	A	Eduard Wiener	Israel	o	o	xo	xxx	5.15	
15	B	Koen van der Wijst	Netherlands	xxo	xo	xxo	xxx	5.15	
16	A	Mateusz Jerzy	Poland	–	o	–	xxx	5.00	
16	A	Urho Kujanpää	Finland	–	o	xxx		5.00	
16	B	Lev Skorish	Israel	–	o	xxx		5.00	
19	A	Istar Dapena	Spain	o	xxx			4.85	
19	B	Itamar Basteker	Israel	o	xxx			4.85	
	A	Uladzislau Chamarmazovich	Belarus	–	xxx			NM	

=== Final ===
16 July

Rank	Name	Nationality	5.10	5.20	5.30	5.40	5.45	5.50	5.55	5.60	5.65	Result	Notes
1st place, gold medalist(s)	Ben Broeders	Belgium	–	o	–	o	–	–	o	o	xxx	5.60	SB
2nd place, silver medalist(s)	Axel Chapelle	France	–	–	o	–	o	o	o	xo	xxx	5.60	
3rd place, bronze medalist(s)	Adrián Vallés	Spain	–	–	o	–	o	o	–	xx–	x	5.50	
4	Mathieu Collet	France	–	–	o	–	o	o	xxx			5.50	
5	Oleg Zernikel	Germany	o	–	xo	o	–	xxx				5.40	
6	Luigi Robert Colella	Italy	o	xo	xo	o	xxx					5.40	PB
7	Tommi Holttinen	Finland	x–	xo	o	xo	xxx					5.40	PB
8	Tomas Wecksten	Finland	o	–	xxo	–	xxx					5.30	
9	Matteo Cristoforo Capello	Italy	–	o	xxx							5.20	
10	Aleix Pi	Spain	xo	o	xxx							5.20	
11	Eirik Greibrokk Dolve	Norway	–	xo	–	–	xxx					5.20	
11	Charlie Myers	Great Britain	–	xo	–	xxx						5.20	
