= 2018 European Athletics Championships – Men's pole vault =

Men's pole vault at the 2018 European Athletics Championships
- Venue: Olympic Stadium
- Location: Berlin
- Dates: August 10 (qualification); August 12 (final)
- Competitors: 36 from 21 nations
- Winning height: 6.05

Medalists
gold medal	Armand Duplantis	Sweden
silver medal	Timur Morgunov	Authorised Neutral Athletes
bronze medal	Renaud Lavillenie	France

Video Highlights

The men's pole vault at the 2018 European Athletics Championships took place at the Olympic Stadium on 10 and 12 August.

== Records ==
Standing records prior to the 2018 European Athletics Championships
World record	Renaud Lavillenie (FRA)	6.16	Donetsk, Ukraine	15 February 2014
European record	Renaud Lavillenie (FRA)	6.16	Donetsk, Ukraine	15 February 2014
Championship record	Rodion Gataullin (RUS)	6.00	Helsinki, Finland	11 August 1994
World Leading	Sam Kendricks (USA)	5.96	Paris, France	30 June 2018
European Leading	Renaud Lavillenie (FRA)	5.95	Austin, United States	14 April 2018
Broken records during the 2018 European Athletics Championships
Championship record	Armand Duplantis (SWE)	6.05	Berlin, Germany	12 August 2018
World Leading	Armand Duplantis (SWE)	6.05	Berlin, Germany	12 August 2018
European Leading	Armand Duplantis (SWE)	6.05	Berlin, Germany	12 August 2018

The following national records were established during the competition:

Country	Athlete	Round	Distance
Sweden, USA (Note: Armand Duplantis is a dual citizen of Sweden and USA. All performances by US citizens count for US records.)	Armand Duplantis (SWE)	Final	6.05 m
Norway	Sondre Guttormsen (NOR)	Final	5.75 m

== Schedule ==
Date	Time	Round
10 August 2018	11:15	Qualification
12 August 2018	19:10	Final

All times are local times (UTC+2)

== Summary ==
The top five European vaulters, all in the top eight in the world, all met in this competition. World record holder Renaud Lavillenie came in ranked #2 in the world for 2018. Paweł Wojciechowski collected misses first, then at 5.80m, eighteen year old Armand Duplantis missed once and Lavillenie missed twice before passing, leaving Piotr Lisek and Timur Morgunov retaining a perfect record to that point, with the lead. Wojciechowski topped out at 5.80m, while Lavillenie redeemed himself with a clearance of 5.85m in his one remaining attempt. Lisek missed once at 5.85m then passed while Morgunov remained perfect to take over the lead. Lisek, Duplantis and Morgunov all took 5.90m on their first attempt, Lavillenie passed and elected to take his next attempt at 5.95m. At 5.95m, Duplantis cleared first, improving his own World under 20 (Junior) record. He took over the lead when Morgunov missed for the first time in the competition. Lavillenie made his first attempt to move into second place (with two misses to Duplantis' one). Morgunov and Lisek passed after their first misses at 5.95m, taking four athletes to attempt the magic 6 meters.

Lisek missed, then Duplantis made it on his first attempt, becoming the youngest athlete to join the 6 metres club, setting the World under 20 record for the second time in the competition. As the next jumper, Morgunov became the 24th member of the club with his first attempt clearance and he moved into a tie for the lead. Lavillenie missed his first attempt and passed, then Lisek bowed out of the competition with his second miss bringing three athletes to the next prescribed height of 6.05m, a height only five athletes had ever cleared. On his first attempt, Duplantis sailed well over the bar and became the sixth, again improving his U20 record from minutes earlier, the third time in the competition, taking the lead. With his success, it was hugs from all the leading members of the pole vault fraternity, save Morgunov who was on the runway preparing for his next attempt. Neither Morgunov or Lavillenie could clear 6.05m, leaving Duplantis with gold, Morgunov with silver and Lavillenie with bronze. Duplantis chose not to make any more attempts at a higher height. Duplantis also broke Rodion Gataullin's 24 year old European championship record which both he and Morgunov had tied at 6 metres.

== Results ==
=== Qualification ===
Qualification: 5.66 m (Q) or best 12 performances (q)

Rank	Group	Name	Nationality	5.16	5.36	5.51	5.61	Result	Notes
1	A	Axel Chapelle	France	–	o	o	o	5.61	q
1	A	Sondre Guttormsen	Norway	–	o	o	o	5.61	q,PB
1	B	Renaud Lavillenie	France	–	–	o	o	5.61	q
1	B	Piotr Lisek	Poland	–	o	o	o	5.61	q
1	B	Paweł Wojciechowski	Poland	–	o	o	o	5.61	q
6	A	Armand Duplantis	Sweden	–	–	xo	o	5.61	q
6	A	Konstantinos Filippidis	Greece	–	xo	o	o	5.61	q
6	B	Adam Hague	Great Britain	o	xo	o	o	5.61	q,PB
9	B	Arnaud Art	Belgium	xo	o	o	xxo	5.61	q
9	A	Timur Morgunov	Authorised Neutral Athletes	–	o	xo	xxo	5.61	q
11	A	Alioune Sene	France	o	o	o	xxx	5.51	q
11	B	Claudio Stecchi	Italy	–	o	o	xxx	5.51	q
13	A	Tommi Holttinen	Finland	xo	x–	o	xxx	5.51	PB
13	B	Torben Laidig	Germany	xxo	o	o	xxx	5.51	
15	A	Bo Kanda Lita Baehre	Germany	o	xo	xxo	xxx	5.51	
16	A	Vladyslav Malykhin	Ukraine	xxo	o	xxo	xxx	5.51	
17	B	Eirik G. Dolve	Norway	o	o	xxx		5.36	
17	B	Georgiy Gorokhov	Authorised Neutral Athletes	–	o	xxx		5.36	
17	A	Urho Kujanpää	Finland	o	o	xxx		5.36	
17	A	Charlie Myers	Great Britain	o	o	xxx		5.36	
17	B	Tomas Wecksten	Finland	o	o	xxx		5.36	
22	B	Mareks Ārents	Latvia	xo	o	xxx		5.36	
22	B	Ivan Horvat	Croatia	xo	o	xxx		5.36	
22	B	Nikandros Stylianou	Cyprus	xo	o	xxx		5.36	
25	B	Uladzislau Chamarmazovich	Belarus	o	xo	xxx		5.36	
25	B	Diogo Ferreira	Portugal	o	xo	xxx		5.36	
25	A	Jan Kudlička	Czech Republic	–	xo	xxx		5.36	
25	A	Robert Sobera	Poland	–	xo	xxx		5.36	
29	B	Didac Salas	Spain	xxo	xo	xxx		5.36	
30	A	Dominik Alberto	Switzerland	xo	xxx			5.16	
31	A	Rutger Koppelaar	Netherlands	xxo	xxx			5.16	
	A	Ben Broeders	Belgium	xxx				NM	
	B	Raphael Holzdeppe	Germany	–	–	xxx		NM	
	A	Ilya Mudrov	Authorised Neutral Athletes	–	xxx			NM	
	B	Melker Svärd Jacobsson	Sweden	–	–	xxx		NM	
	A	Adrián Vallés	Spain	xxx				NM	

=== Final ===
Rank	Athlete	Nationality	5.30	5.50	5.65	5.75	5.80	5.85	5.90	5.95	6.00	6.05	6.10	Result	Notes
1st place, gold medalist(s)	Armand Duplantis	Sweden	–	o	o	–	xo	o	o	o	o	o	r	6.05	WU20R, CR
2nd place, silver medalist(s)	Timur Morgunov	Authorised Neutral Athletes	–	o	o	o	–	o	o	x–	o	xxx		6.00	PB
3rd place, bronze medalist(s)	Renaud Lavillenie	France	–	–	o	–	xx–	o	–	o	x–	xx		5.95	=SB
4	Piotr Lisek	Poland	–	o	–	o	o	x–	o	x–	xx			5.90	PB
5	Paweł Wojciechowski	Poland	o	o	xo	x–	o	x–	–	xx				5.80	SB
6	Konstantinos Filippidis	Greece	–	o	xo	o	xxx							5.75	
6	Sondre Guttormsen	Norway	o	o	xo	o	xx–	x						5.75	NR
8	Axel Chapelle	France	–	o	o	xxx								5.65	
9	Arnaud Art	Belgium	o	xo	o	xxx								5.65	
10	Adam Hague	Great Britain	o	o	xxo	xxx								5.65	PB
11	Claudio Stecchi	Italy	o	o	xxx									5.50	
12	Alioune Sene	France	xo	xxx										5.30	
