= 2014 World Junior Championships in Athletics – Men's pole vault =

Key to notes
- WJR: World Junior Record
- CR: Championship Record
- WJL: World Junior Leading
- AJR: Area Junior Record
- NJR: National Junior Record
- PB: Personal Best
- SB: Season Best
- DNS: Did not start
- DNF: Did not finish
- NM: No mark

Key to results
- Q: Automatic qualification
- q: Qualified as best performer
- o: Clear
- x: Fail

The men's pole vault events at the 2014 World Junior Championships in Athletics took place at Hayward Field in Eugene, Oregon on 24 and 26 July.

== Medalists ==
Gold	Silver	Bronze
Axel Chapelle; France	Daniil Kotov; Russia	Oleg Zernikel; Germany

== Records ==
Standing records prior to the 2014 World Junior Championships in Athletics
World Junior Record	Maksim Tarasov (URS)	5.80	Bryansk, Soviet Union	14 July 1989
World Junior Record	Raphael Holzdeppe (GER)	5.80	Biberach, Germany	28 June 2008
Championship Record	Germán Chiaraviglio (ARG)	5.71	Beijing, China	19 August 2006
World Junior Leading	Axel Chapelle (FRA)	5.52	Tergnier, France	29 May 2014

== Results ==
=== Qualification ===
Qualification: Standard 5.25 m (Q) or at least 12 best performers (q).

Rank	Group	Name	Nation	4.70	4.85	5.00	5.10	5.20	Result	Note
T1	A	Adam Hague	Great Britain	o	o	o	o	o	5.20	q
T1	B	Harry Coppell	Great Britain	–	–	o	o	o	5.20	q
T3	B	Eirik Greibrokk Dolve	Norway	–	–	o	o	xo	5.20	q
T3	A	Oleg Zernikel	Germany	–	o	o	o	xo	5.20	q
T3	A	Jack Hicking	Australia	o	o	o	o	xo	5.20	q
6	A	Axel Chapelle	France	–	–	–	xo	xo	5.20	q
7	B	Huang Bokai	China	–	–	o	o	xxo	5.20	q
T8	B	Lev Skorish	Israel	–	xo	xo	o	xxo	5.20	q
T8	A	Luigi Colella	Italy	o	o	xo	xo	xxo	5.20	q, PB
10	A	Devin King	United States	–	o	o	o	xxx	5.10	q
T11	A	Daniil Kotov	Russia	–	xo	o	o	xxx	5.10	q
T11	B	Aleix Pi	Spain	o	o	xo	o	xxx	5.10	q
T11	B	Leonid Kobelev	Russia	–	xo	o	o	xxx	5.10	q
14	B	Mateusz Jerzy	Poland	o	–	xxo	o	xxx	5.10	
15	A	Koen van der Wijst	Netherlands	o	o	o	xo	xxx	5.10	PB
16	A	José Rodolfo Pacho	Ecuador	–	o	xo	xo	xxx	5.10	
17	A	Adrián Vallés	Spain	–	o	–	xxo	xxx	5.10	
18	B	Tomas Wecksten	Finland	o	o	xo	xxo	xxx	5.10	
19	A	Kota Suzuki	Japan	–	o	o	xxx	—N/a	5.00	
T20	A	Ben Broeders	Belgium	–	xo	o	–	xxx	5.00	
T20	A	Valentínos Tamotsídis	Greece	xo	o	o	xxx	—N/a	5.00	
T20	B	Kurtis Marschall	Australia	o	xo	o	xxx	—N/a	5.00	
23	B	Lamin Krubally	Germany	–	o	xo	xxx	—N/a	5.00	
24	B	Cole Walsh	United States	–	–	xxo	xxx	—N/a	5.00	
25	B	Mathieu Collet	France	–	xo	xxx	—N/a		4.85	
26	B	Pascal Kethers	New Zealand	o	xxo	xxx	—N/a		4.85	
27	B	Matthias Freinberger	Austria	o	xxx	—N/a			4.70	
28	A	Raúl Alejandro Ríos	Mexico	xo	xxx	—N/a			4.70	
—N/a	A	Lukas Wirth	Austria	—N/a					NM	
—N/a	B	Jorge Luna	Mexico	—N/a					NM	

=== Final ===
Summary:

Rank	Name	Nation	4.85	5.00	5.10	5.20	5.30	5.35	5.40	5.45	5.50	5.55	5.64	Result	Note
1st place, gold medalist(s)	Axel Chapelle	France	–	–	–	o	–	o	–	xo	o	o	xxx	5.55	WJL
2nd place, silver medalist(s)	Daniil Kotov	Russia	–	o	–	o	o	–	o	o	o	xxx	—N/a	5.50	PB
3rd place, bronze medalist(s)	Oleg Zernikel	Germany	–	o	–	o	o	–	o	–	xo	xxx	—N/a	5.50	PB
4	Devin King	United States	–	o	xo	xo	o	–	o	o	xo	xxx	—N/a	5.50	PB
T5	Huang Bokai	China	–	–	o	xo	o	xo	o	o	x–	xx	—N/a	5.45	PB
T5	Leonid Kobelev	Russia	–	xo	–	o	–	xo	–	o	x–	xx	—N/a	5.45	PB
7	Jack Hicking	Australia	o	xo	xo	o	o	–	o	xxx	—N/a			5.40	PB
8	Adam Hague	Great Britain	–	o	o	o	xo	xo	xxx	—N/a				5.35	PB
9	Eirik Greibrokk Dolve	Norway	–	–	xo	o	xo	–	xxx	—N/a				5.30	
10	Harry Coppell	Great Britain	–	o	–	o	xxx	—N/a						5.20	
11	Luigi Colella	Italy	o	xxo	xo	xxo	xxx	—N/a						5.20	PB
12	Aleix Pi	Spain	o	xo	o	xxx	—N/a							5.10	
13	Lev Skorish	Israel	–	xo	xo	xxx	—N/a							5.10	
