= Ben Broeders =

Belgian pole vaulter (born 1995)

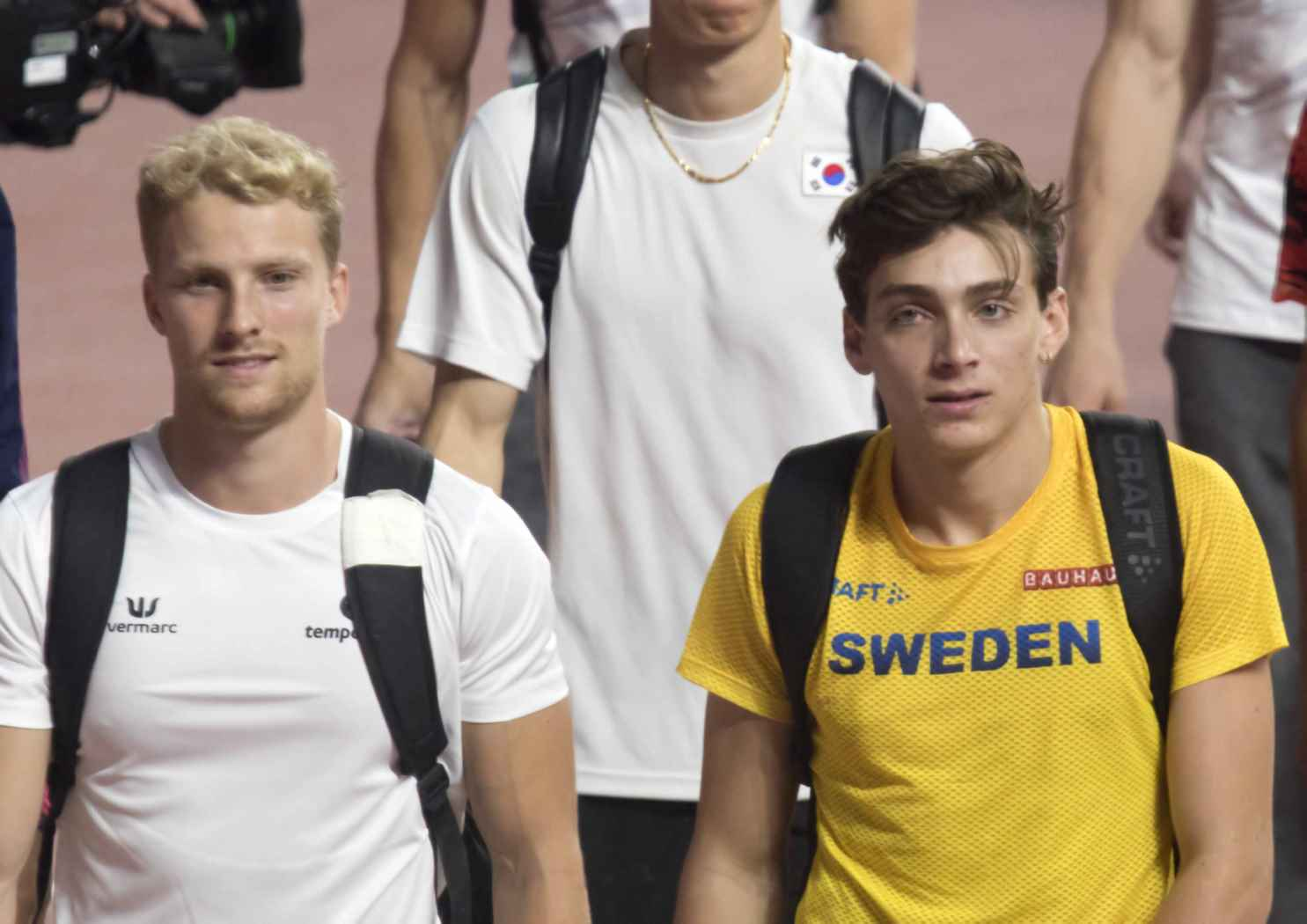
- Broeders in 2019

Personal information
- Born: 21 June 1995 (age 31) Leuven, Belgium
- Education: Daring Club Leuven Atletiek; Rotterdam Atletiek
- Height: 1.78 m (5 ft 10 in)
- Weight: 75 kg (165 lb)
- Spouse: Femke Bol (m. 2026)

Sport
- Sport: Athletics
- Event: Pole vault
- Coached by: Rens Blom & Helena Duplantis

Ben Broeders (pronounced [bɛn] [ˈbrudərs]; born 21 June 1995) is a Belgian athlete specialising in the pole vault. He won the gold medal at the 2017 European U23 Championships. In addition, he finished fourth at the European Championships.

His personal bests in the event are 5.85 metres outdoors (Merzig 2022) and 5.82 metres indoors (Toruń 2023).

== Personal life ==
On 21 February 2026, Broeders married Dutch athlete Femke Bol in Amersfoort.

== Achievements ==
=== International competitions ===
Representing Belgium
Year	Competition	Venue	Position	Notes
2014	World Junior Championships	Eugene, United States	20th (q)	5.00 m
2015	European U23 Championships	Tallinn, Estonia	9th	5.20 m
2016	European Championships	Amsterdam, Netherlands	4th	5.50 m
2017	European U23 Championships	Bydgoszcz, Poland	1st	5.60 m
2018	European Championships	Berlin, Germany	–	NM
2019	Universiade	Naples, Italy	3rd	5.51 m
2019	World Championships	Doha, Qatar	12th	5.55 m
2021	Olympic Games	Tokyo, Japan	18th (q)	5.65 m
2022	World Indoor Championships	Belgrade, Serbia	5th	5.75 m
2022	World Championships	Eugene, United States	11th	5.70 m
2022	European Championships	Munich, Germany	15th (q)	5.50 m
2023	European Indoor Championships	Istanbul, Turkey	8th	5.60 m
2023	World Championships	Budapest, Hungary	7th	5.75 m
2024	World Indoor Championships	Glasgow, United Kingdom	6th	5.65 m
2024	European Championships	Rome, Italy	12th	5.50 m
2024	Olympic Games	Paris, France	15th (q)	5.60 m
2025	European Indoor Championships	Apeldoorn, Netherlands	5th	5.70 m
2025	World Championships	Tokyo, Japan	16th (q)	5.70 m
2026	European Championships	Birmingham, United Kingdom	8th	5.70 m

=== Circuit wins ===
- World Athletics Indoor Tour
  - 2024: Cottbus International Jump Meeting (5.65 m)
  - 2025: Dortmund Sparkassen Indoor Meeting (5.72 m)
- World Athletics Continental Tour
  - 2024: Brussels IFAM Outdoor (5.72 m), Liège Meeting International d'Athlétisme de la Province de Liège (5.66 m), Rovereto 60° Palio Città della Quercia (5.71 m)
  - 2025: Essen Tag der Überflieger (5.75 m), Liège (5.56 m)
  - 2026: Gothenburg Folksam Grand Prix (5.60 m)
