= 2015 European Athletics U23 Championships – Men's pole vault =

The men's pole vault event at the 2015 European Athletics U23 Championships was held in Tallinn, Estonia, at Kadriorg Stadium on 9 and 11 July.

== Medalists ==
Gold	Robert Renner; Slovenia
Silver	Leonid Kobelev; Russia
Bronze	Adrián Vallés; Spain

== Results ==
=== Final ===
11 July

Rank	Name	Nationality	Attempts								Result	Notes
Rank	Name	Nationality	5.00	5.20	5.30	5.40	5.50	5.55	5.60	5.65	Result	Notes
1st place, gold medalist(s)	Robert Renner	Slovenia	–	o	–	xo	o	o	xx–	x	5.55	NUR PB
2nd place, silver medalist(s)	Leonid Kobelev	Russia	–	xo	–	o	xo	xo	xxx		5.55	PB
3rd place, bronze medalist(s)	Adrián Vallés	Spain	–	o	–	o	o	xx–	x		5.50	
4	Eirik Greibrokk Dolve	Norway	xo	xxo	–	o	xxx				5.40	
5	Ivan Horvat	Croatia	o	o	–	xxo	xxx				5.40	
5	Didac Salas	Spain	–	o	–	xxo	–	xxx			5.40	=SB
7	Arnaud Art	Belgium	–	–	o	–	x–	xx			5.30	
8	Menno Vloon	Netherlands	–	–	xo	–	xxx				5.30	
9	Ben Broeders	Belgium	–	o	–	xxx					5.20	
10	Axel Chapelle	France	–	xo	–	xxx					5.20	
10	Danyil Kotov	Russia	–	xo	xxx						5.20	
12	Tamás Kéri	Hungary	xo	xxo	xxx						5.20	=PB

=== Qualifications ===
9 July

Rank	Name	Nationality	Attempts				Result	Notes
Rank	Name	Nationality	4.80	5.00	5.10	5.20	Result	Notes
1	Menno Vloon	Netherlands	–	–	–	o	5.20	q
2	Adrián Vallés	Spain	–	–	o		5.10	q
2	Didac Salas	Spain	–	–	o		5.10	q
2	Ivan Horvat	Croatia	–	–	o		5.10	q
2	Arnaud Art	Belgium	–	–	o		5.10	q
6	Eirik Greibrokk Dolve	Norway	–	xo	o		5.10	q
7	Leonid Kobelev	Russia	–	–	xo		5.10	q
7	Axel Chapelle	France	–	–	xo		5.10	q
9	Danyil Kotov	Russia	–	–	xxo		5.10	q
10	Robert Renner	Slovenia	–	o			5.00	q
10	Ben Broeders	Belgium	–	o	xxx		5.00	q
10	Tamás Kéri	Hungary	o	o	xxx		5.00	q
13	Lukas Wirth	Austria	–	xxo	xxx		5.00	
14	Aleksi Saarelainen	Finland	o	xxx			4.80	
15	Carl Sténson	Sweden	xo	xxx			4.80	
16	Icaro Miranda	Portugal	xxo	xxx			4.80	
	Karol Pawlik	Poland	–	xxx			NH	
	Ruben Miranda	Portugal	–	xxx			NH	
	Alessandro Sinno	Italy	–	xxx			NH	
	Etamar Bhastekar	Israel	xxx				NH	
	Krister Blær Jónsson	Iceland	xxx				NH	

== Participation ==
According to an unofficial count, 21 athletes from 17 countries participated in the event.

- Austria (1)
- Belgium (2)
- Croatia (1)
- Finland (1)
- France (1)
- Hungary (1)
- Iceland (1)
- Israel (1)
- Italy (1)
- Netherlands (1)
- Norway (1)
- Poland (1)
- Portugal (2)
- Russia (2)
- Slovenia (1)
- Spain (2)
- Sweden (1)
