= Scott Houston (athlete) =

American pole vaulter (born 1990)

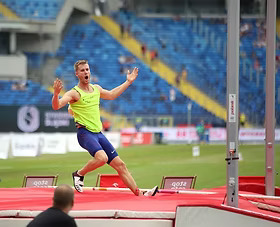
Scott Houston after making the bar

Scott Houston (born 11 June 1990) is an American track and field athlete who competes in the pole vault. He was the American national indoor champion in 2018. He competed collegiately for both the North Carolina Tar Heels and the Indiana Hoosiers. Houston has also coached collegiate pole vaulters.

== Career ==
Born in Winter Springs, Florida, he moved with his family to Oak Ridge, North Carolina and attended nearby Northwest Guilford High School. He competed in pole vault while there and broke the state high school record and was captain of the school track and field team.

Houston went on to study a sports science major at University of North Carolina at Chapel Hill and competed for their North Carolina Tar Heels collegiate track team. He was third at the Atlantic Coast Conference meet in his freshman year and ended the 2009 season with a best of 5.34 m (17 ft 6 in). He redshirted the 2010 indoor and the 2011 outdoor seasons.

He continued his studies at Indiana University Bloomington and with their Indiana Hoosiers he won the 2013 Big Ten Conference outdoor title and was a qualify for the NCAA Outdoor Championships. A mature student, he also served as a volunteer assistant track coach from 2013 to 2015. He helped coached fellow vaulter Terry Batemon to a conference title and Kelsie Ahbe and Sophie Gutermuth to a 1–2 placing at the 2014 Big Ten Championships. He was named track and field assistant coach at High Point University in 2015.

Houston's own progress stalled from 2009 to 2014, given his focus on academics and coaching. This changed in the 2015 indoor season, when he set a new personal record of 5.51 m (18 ft 3/4 in) and placed fourth at the 2015 USA Indoor Track and Field Championships. In the outdoor season another best of 5.62 m (18 ft 5 1/4 in) followed, but he failed to record a height at the 2015 USA Outdoor Track and Field Championships. He cleared 5.65 m (18 ft 6 1/4 in) in the 2016 outdoor season, but failed to figure among the leaders at the 2016 United States Olympic Trials due to an ankle injury that took place en route to qualifying for the Olympic Trials Final. He managed fourth at the 2017 USA Indoors, then was fifth at the 2017 USA Outdoor Track and Field Championships. A new best of 5.78 m (18 ft 11 1/2 in) that July ranked him in the world top 25 vaulters for the first time.

Houston had a career breakthrough at the age of 27 when he won the national title at the 2018 USA Indoor Track and Field Championships, defeating world champion Sam Kendricks with a personal record of 5.83 m (19 ft 1 1/2 in).

== Competition record ==
Year	Competition	Venue	Position	Notes
Representing United States
2018	World Indoor Championships	Birmingham, United Kingdom	13th	5.60 m
2018	NACAC Championships	Toronto, Canada	1st	5.45 m

== National titles ==
- USA Indoor Track and Field Championships
  - Pole vault: 2018
