= Timur Morgunov =

Russian pole vaulter

Personal information
- Nationality: Russian
- Born: 12 October 1996 (age 30) Kopeysk, Russia

Sport
- Country: Russia / ANA (2017–18)
- Sport: Track and field
- Event: Pole vault

Achievements and titles
- Personal bests: Indoor: 5.85 m (2018); Outdoor: 6.00 m (2018)
Medal record
Representing Authorised Neutral Athletes
European Championships
Silver medal – second place	2018 Berlin	Pole vault

Timur Morgunov (born 12 October 1996) is a Russian track and field athlete specialising in the pole vault. As an Authorised Neutral Athlete, he won the silver medal at the 2018 European Athletics Championships. He did not compete at the 2020 Summer Olympics as he was not granted neutral status.
