= Arnaud Art =

Belgian pole vaulter (born 1993)

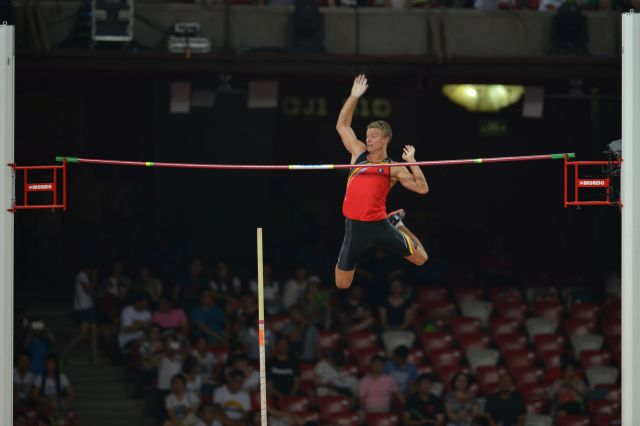
- Arnaud Art at the 2015 World Championships in Athletics

Personal information
- Born: 28 January 1993 (age 32) Hannut, Belgium

Sport
- Country: Belgium
- Sport: Track and field
- Event: Pole vault
- Coached by: Damiel Dossévi

Arnaud Art (born 28 January 1993) is a Belgian athlete who specialises in the pole vault. He competed at the 2015 World Championships in Beijing without qualifying for the final. His personal bests in the event are 5.72 metres outdoors (Liege 2018) and 5.61 metres indoors (Rennes 2016).

== Competition record ==
| Year | Competition | Venue | Position | Notes |
Representing Belgium
| 2009 | European Youth Olympic Festival | Tampere, Finland | 1st | 4.85 m |
| 2010 | Youth Olympic Games | Singapore | 6th | 4.85 m |
| 2011 | European Junior Championships | Tallinn, Estonia | 8th | 5.10 m |
| 2012 | World Junior Championships | Barcelona, Spain | 10th (q) | 5.15 m |
| 2014 | European Championships | Zurich, Switzerland | 16th (q) | 5.30 m |
| 2015 | European U23 Championships | Tallinn, Estonia | 7th | 5.30 m |
| 2015 | World Championships | Beijing, China | 31st (q) | 5.40 m |
| 2016 | European Championships | Amsterdam, Netherlands | 11th | 5.30 m |
| 2017 | World Championships | London, United Kingdom | 9th (q) | 5.60 m^{1} |
| 2018 | European Championships | Berlin, Germany | 9th | 5.65 m |

^{1}No mark in the final
