= Diogo Ferreira (pole vaulter) =

Portuguese pole vaulter

Personal information
- Full name: Diogo Miguel Pacheco Ferreira
- Born: 30 July 1990 (age 36) Queluz, Portugal
- Education: Universidade Lusófona
- Height: 1.75 m (5 ft 9 in)
- Weight: 77 kg (170 lb)

Sport
- Sport: Athletics
- Event: Pole vault
- Club: Benfica
- Coached by: Pedro Pinto

Diogo Miguel Pacheco Ferreira (born 30 July 1990 in Queluz) is a Portuguese athlete specialising in the pole vault. He won the gold medal at the 2017 Summer Universiade. In addition, he represented his country at the 2017 World Championships without clearing any height.

His personal bests in the event are 5.71 metres outdoors (Lisbon 2017) and 5.60 metres indoors (Potsdam 2015) The former is the current national record.

== International competitions ==
Year	Competition	Venue	Position	Notes
Representing Portugal
2009	European Junior Championships	Novi Sad, Serbia	15th (q)	4.70 m
2010	Ibero-American Championships	San Fernando, Spain	7th	5.05 m
2011	European U23 Championships	Ostrava, Czech Republic	16th (q)	4.95 m
2014	European Championships	Zürich, Switzerland	11th (q)	5.50 m^{1}
2015	European Indoor Championships	Prague, Czech Republic	18th (q)	5.25 m
2015	Universiade	Gwangju, South Korea	11th (q)	5.20 m^{1}
2016	European Championships	Amsterdam, Netherlands	19th (q)	5.35 m
2017	World Championships	London, United Kingdom	–	NM
2017	Universiade	Taipei, Taiwan	1st	5.55 m
2018	European Championships	Berlin, Germany	25th (q)	5.36 m

^{1}No mark in the final
