= 2017 European Athletics Indoor Championships – Men's pole vault =

The men's pole vault event at the 2017 European Athletics Indoor Championships was held on 3 March at 17:00 local time.

== Medalists ==
Gold	Silver	Bronze
Piotr Lisek; Poland	Konstadinos Filippidis; Greece	Paweł Wojciechowski; Poland

== Records ==
Standing records prior to the 2017 European Athletics Indoor Championships
World record	Renaud Lavillenie (FRA)	6.16	Donetsk, Ukraine	15 February 2014
European record	Renaud Lavillenie (FRA)	6.16	Donetsk, Ukraine	15 February 2014
Championship record	Renaud Lavillenie (FRA)	6.04	Prague, Czech Republic	7 March 2015
World Leading	Piotr Lisek (POL)	6.00	Potsdam, Germany	4 February 2017
European Leading	Piotr Lisek (POL)	6.00	Potsdam, Germany	4 February 2017

== Results ==
=== Final ===
Rank	Athlete	Nationality	5.35	5.50	5.60	5.70	5.75	5.80	5.85	5.90	Result	Note
1st place, gold medalist(s)	Piotr Lisek	Poland	o	o	o	o	x-	o	o	xxx	5.85	
2nd place, silver medalist(s)	Konstadinos Filippidis	Greece	xo	o	o	o	x-	xo	o	xxx	5.85	NR
3rd place, bronze medalist(s)	Paweł Wojciechowski	Poland	o	o	o	xo	–	–	xxo	xxx	5.85	SB
4	Jan Kudlička	Czech Republic	–	o	–	o	o	o	xxx		5.80	SB
5	Raphael Holzdeppe	Germany	–	–	o	o	x-	o	xxx		5.80	SB
6	Axel Chapelle	France	xo	o	xo	o	o	o	xxx		5.80	PB
7	Ivan Horvat	Croatia	xo	o	xo	o	o	xxx			5.75	
8	Mareks Ārents	Latvia	o	xo	o	xxx					5.60	SB
8	Stanley Joseph	France	o	xo	o	xxx					5.60	
10	Kévin Menaldo	France	–	o	xo	xxx					5.60	
11	Emmanouil Karális	Greece	o	o	xxx						5.50	
	Florian Gaul	Germany									DNS	
