= 2019 European Athletics Indoor Championships – Men's pole vault =

The men's pole vault event at the 2019 European Athletics Indoor Championships was held on 1 March at 19:06 (qualification) and 2 March at 18:10 (final) local time.

== Medalists ==
Gold	Silver	Bronze
Paweł Wojciechowski; Poland	Piotr Lisek; Poland	Melker Svärd Jacobsson; Sweden

== Records ==
Standing records prior to the 2019 European Athletics Indoor Championships
World record	Renaud Lavillenie (FRA)	6.16	Donetsk, Ukraine	15 February 2014
European record	Renaud Lavillenie (FRA)	6.16	Donetsk, Ukraine	15 February 2014
Championship record	Renaud Lavillenie (FRA)	6.04	Prague, Czech Republic	7 March 2015
World Leading	Piotr Lisek (POL); Sam Kendricks (USA)	5.93	Clermont-Ferrand, France	24 February 2019
European Leading	Piotr Lisek (POL)	5.93	Clermont-Ferrand, France	24 February 2019

== Results ==
=== Qualification ===
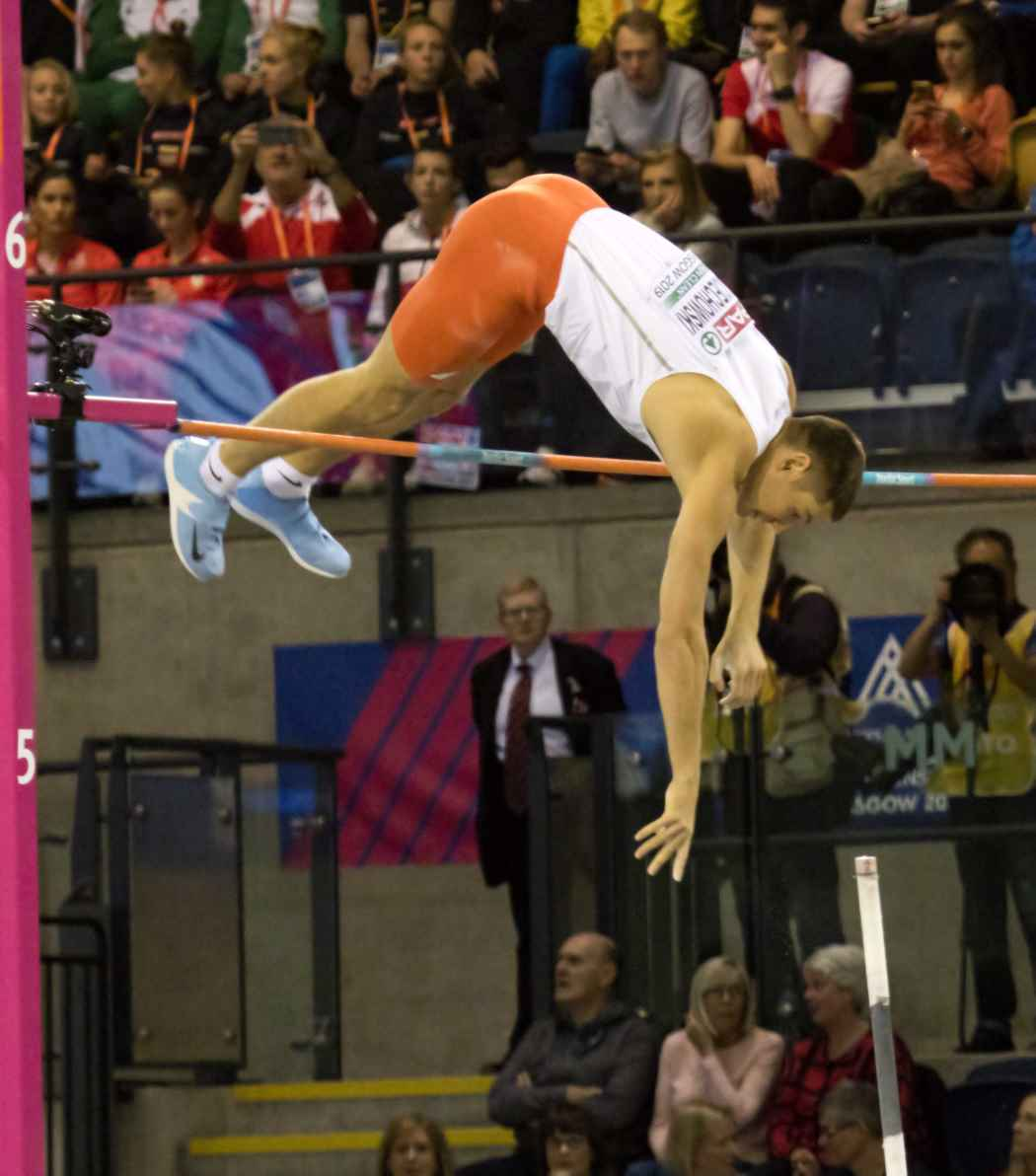
Gold medal winner Paweł Wojciechowski

Qualification: Qualifying performance 5.80 (Q) or at least 8 best performers (q) advance to the final.

Rank	Athlete	Nationality	5.20	5.35	5.50	5.60	5.70	Result	Note
1	Emmanouil Karalis	Greece	–	–	o	o	o	5.70	q
1	Piotr Lisek	Poland	–	–	o	o	o	5.70	q
3	Sondre Guttormsen	Norway	–	xo	o	o	o	5.70	q
4	Bo Kanda Lita Bähre	Germany	–	o	xxo	o	o	5.70	q, =PB
5	Claudio Michel Stecchi	Italy	–	–	o	o	xo	5.70	q
6	Georgiy Gorokhov	Authorised Neutral Athletes	–	o	xo	o	xo	5.70	q, =PB
6	Melker Svärd Jacobsson	Sweden	–	o	–	xo	xo	5.70	q
8	Konstadinos Filippidis	Greece	–	o	o	o	xx-	5.60	q
8	Paweł Wojciechowski	Poland	–	o	o	o	xx-	5.60	q
10	Axel Chapelle	France	–	–	o	x-	xx	5.50	
10	Robert Sobera	Poland	–	o	o	x-	xx	5.50	
12	Ivan Horvat	Croatia	o	o	xxx			5.35	
13	Matěj Ščerba	Czech Republic	xo	xo	xxx			5.35	
14	Alioune Sene	France	–	xxo	xxx			5.35	

=== Final ===
Rank	Athlete	Nationality	5.30	5.45	5.55	5.65	5.75	5.80	5.85	5.90	5.95	Result	Note
1st place, gold medalist(s)	Paweł Wojciechowski	Poland	o	o	o	xxo	xo	o	x-	xo	xxx	5.90	PB
2nd place, silver medalist(s)	Piotr Lisek	Poland	–	o	–	o	o	o	o	xx-	x	5.85	
3rd place, bronze medalist(s)	Melker Svärd Jacobsson	Sweden	–	–	xxo	–	xxo	x-	xx			5.75	
4	Emmanouil Karalis	Greece	–	–	o	o	xxx					5.65	
4	Claudio Michel Stecchi	Italy	–	–	o	o	xxx					5.65	
6	Sondre Guttormsen	Norway	xo	o	o	xxx						5.55	
7	Bo Kanda Lita Bähre	Germany	–	o	xo	xxx						5.55	
8	Georgiy Gorokhov	Authorised Neutral Athletes	o	–	xxo	xxx						5.55	
	Konstadinos Filippidis	Greece	–	xxx								NM	
