= 2017 World Championships in Athletics – Men's pole vault =

Olympic event

Men's pole vault at the 2017 World Championships
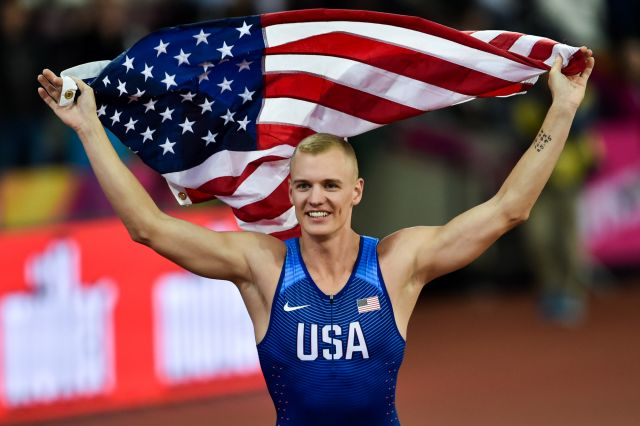
- Sam Kendricks, the winner of the event.
- Venue: Olympic Stadium
- Dates: 6 August (qualification); 8 August (final)
- Competitors: 29 from 19 nations
- Winning height: 5.95

Medalists
gold medal	Sam Kendricks	United States
silver medal	Piotr Lisek	Poland
bronze medal	Renaud Lavillenie	France

Video on YouTube Official Video

The men's pole vault at the 2017 World Championships in Athletics was held at the Olympic Stadium on 6 and 8 August.

== Summary ==
Of the twelve finalists, only three reached 5.75 metres without any fails: Olympic bronze medalist Sam Kendricks (USA), world record holder Renaud Lavillenie and Xue Changrui (China). Two Polish vaulters, Piotr Lisek and Paweł Wojciechowski, also cleared that height but with previous misses. Kendricks and Xue succeeded first time at 5.82 metres, while all the others passed after one failure to the next height, 5.89 metres. Kendricks and Lisek cleared that height on their first attempts, and Lavillenie on his last attempt, with Xue and Wojciechowski failing to clear that height and leaving the three medallists confirmed. All three were unsuccessful in their first two tries at 5.95 metres, and on the third try Kendrick succeeded, Lisek failed, and Lavillenie passed. Both Kendricks and Lavillenie failed at 6.01 metres, leaving Lavillenie with bronze and Kendricks with gold.

== Records ==
Before the competition records were as follows:

Record	Perf.	Athlete	Nat.	Date	Location
World	6.16	Renaud Lavillenie	FRA	5 Feb 2014	Donetsk, Ukraine
Championship	6.05	Dmitri Markov	AUS	9 Aug 2001	Edmonton, Canada
World leading	6.00	Sam Kendricks	USA	24 Jun 2017	Sacramento, United States
African	6.03	Okkert Brits	RSA	18 Aug 1995	Cologne, Germany
Asian	5.92	Igor Potapovich	KAZ	19 Feb 1998	Stockholm, Sweden
NACAC	6.04	Brad Walker	USA	8 Jun 2008	Eugene, OR, United States
South American	6.03	Thiago Braz da Silva	BRA	15 Aug 2016	Rio de Janeiro, Brazil
European	6.16	Renaud Lavillenie	FRA	15 Feb 2014	Donetsk, Ukraine
Oceanian	6.06	Steven Hooker	AUS	7 Feb 2009	Boston, MA, United States

The following records were set at the competition:

Record	Perf.	Athlete	Nat.	Date
Chinese	5.82	Xue Changrui	CHN	8 Aug 2017

== Qualification standard ==
The standard to qualify automatically for entry was 5.70 metres.

== Schedule ==
The event schedule, in local time (UTC+1), was as follows:

Date	Time	Round
6 August	10:40	Qualification
8 August	19:35	Final

== Results ==
=== Qualification ===
The qualification round took place on 6 August, in two groups, both starting at 10:40. Athletes attaining a mark of 5.75 metres ( Q ) or at least the 12 best performers ( q ) qualified for the final. The overall results were as follows:

Rank	Group	Name	Nationality	5.30	5.45	5.60	5.70	Mark	Notes
1	A	Renaud Lavillenie	France	-	-	o	o	5.70	q
1	A	Piotr Lisek	Poland	o	o	o	o	5.70	q
3	B	Sam Kendricks	United States	o	o	xxo	o	5.70	q
4	B	Shawnacy Barber	Canada	o	o	o	xxo	5.70	q
5	A	Axel Chapelle	France	xo	o	o	xxo	5.70	q
5	A	Raphael Holzdeppe	Germany	-	o	xo	xxo	5.70	q
7	B	Paweł Wojciechowski	Poland	-	o	xxo	xxo	5.70	q
8	A	Armand Duplantis	Sweden	xxo	xo	xo	xxo	5.70	q
9	B	Arnaud Art	Belgium	o	o	o	xxx	5.60	q
10	A	Xue Changrui	China	-	xo	o	xxx	5.60	q
11	B	Kurtis Marschall	Australia	o	xxo	o	xxx	5.60	q
11	B	Yao Jie	China	o	xxo	o	xxx	5.60	q
13	B	Christopher Nilsen	United States	o	o	xo	xxx	5.60	
14	B	Valentin Lavillenie	France	-	xo	xo	xxx	5.60	
15	A	Andrew Irwin	United States	xxo	o	xo	xxx	5.60	
16	A	Adrián Vallés	Spain	xxo	xo	xo	xxx	5.60	
17	A	Vladyslav Malykhin	Ukraine	xxo	o	xxo	xxx	5.60	
18	A	Jan Kudlička	Czech Republic	-	o	xxx		5.45	
18	B	Hiroki Ogita	Japan	o	o	xxx		5.45	
20	A	Germán Chiaraviglio	Argentina	xo	o	xxx		5.45	
21	A	Emmanouil Karális	Greece	xxo	o	xxx		5.45	
22	A	Ilya Mudrov	Authorised Neutral Athletes	o	xo	xxx		5.45	
22	A	Ivan Horvat	Croatia	o	xo	xxx		5.45	
22	B	Kévin Menaldo	France	-	xo	xxx		5.45	
25	B	Michal Balner	Czech Republic	xo	xxo	xxx		5.45	
26	A	Seito Yamamoto	Japan	o	xxx			5.30	
	B	Diogo Ferreira	Portugal	xxx				NH	
	B	Igor Bychkov	Spain	xxx				NH	
	B	Menno Vloon	Netherlands	-	x-	-	r	NH	
	B	Konstantinos Filippidis	Greece	-	-	-	-	DNS	(Note: Konstantinos Filippidis didn't participate due to an injury before the Qualification Round.)

=== Final ===
The final took place on 8 August at 19:42. The results were as follows:

Rank	Name	Nationality	5.50	5.65	5.75	5.82	5.89	5.95	6.01	Mark	Notes
1st place, gold medalist(s)	Sam Kendricks	United States	o	o	o	o	o	xxo	xr	5.95	
2nd place, silver medalist(s)	Piotr Lisek	Poland	o	xxo	o	x-	o	xxx		5.89	
3rd place, bronze medalist(s)	Renaud Lavillenie	France	–	o	o	x-	xo	xx-	x	5.89	SB
4	Xue Changrui	China	o	o	o	o	xxx			5.82	NR
5	Paweł Wojciechowski	Poland	o	o	xo	x-	xx			5.75	
6	Axel Chapelle	France	o	o	xxx					5.65	
7	Kurtis Marschall	Australia	xo	o	xxx					5.65	
8	Shawnacy Barber	Canada	xo	xxo	xxx					5.65	
9	Armand Duplantis	Sweden	o	xxx						5.50	
	Arnaud Art	Belgium	xxx							NH	
	Raphael Holzdeppe	Germany	xxx							NH	
	Yao Jie	China	xxx							NH	
