= Shawn Barber (pole vaulter) =

Canadian pole vaulter (1994–2024)

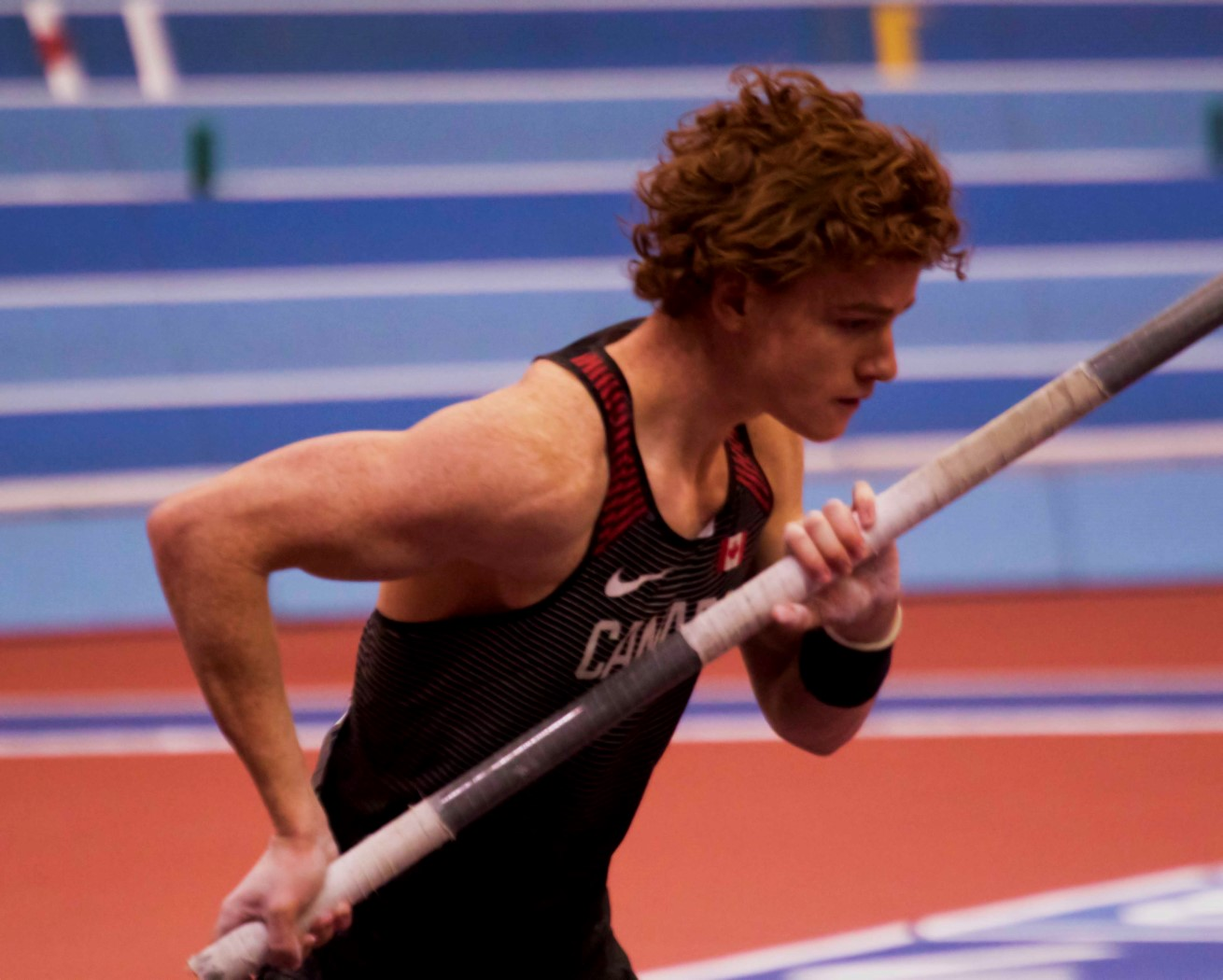
- Barber competing in 2018

Personal information
- Full name: Shawnacy Campbell Barber
- Nationality: Canadian
- Born: 27 May 1994 Las Cruces, New Mexico, U.S.
- Died: 17 January 2024 (aged 29) Kingwood, Texas, U.S.
- Home town: Kingwood, Texas, U.S.; Toronto, Ontario, Canada
- Height: 1.87 m (6 ft 2 in)
- Weight: 82 kg (181 lb; 12.9 st)

Sport
- Sport: Track and field
- Event: Pole vault
- College team: University of Akron
- Turned pro: 2015

Achievements and titles
- Personal bests: Outdoor 5.93 m (2015) NR; Indoor 6.00 m (2016) NR
Medal record
Event	1st	2nd	3rd
World Championships	1	0	0
Commonwealth Games	0	1	1
Pan American Games	1	0	0
Jeux de la Francophonie	0	1	0
World Junior Championships	0	0	1
Continental Cup	0	0	1
Total	2	2	3
Men's athletics
Representing Canada
World Championships
Gold medal – first place	2015 Beijing	Pole vault
Commonwealth Games
Silver medal – second place	2018 Gold Coast	Pole vault
Bronze medal – third place	2014 Glasgow	Pole vault
Pan American Games
Gold medal – first place	2015 Toronto	Pole vault
Jeux de la Francophonie
Silver medal – second place	2013 Nice	Pole vault
World Junior Championships
Bronze medal – third place	2012 Barcelona	Pole vault
Representing Americas
Continental Cup
Bronze medal – third place	2018 Ostrava	Pole vault

Shawnacy Campbell Barber (27 May 1994 – 17 January 2024) was a Canadian track and field athlete specializing in the pole vault.

Barber was a world champion in pole vault, having won the event with a height of 5.90 m at the 2015 World Championships in Athletics in Beijing. Barber also became a Pan American Games champion in winning the 2015 edition of the Games with a height of 5.80 m. Barber won a bronze medal at the 2014 Commonwealth Games in Glasgow as well.

His outdoor personal best jump of 5.93 metres was made on 25 July 2015, and it is the current national record. His indoor personal best was 6.00 metres from 2016, also a national record. Barber is tied for the Pan Am record together with Lázaro Borges. He also holds the NCAA Collegiate Indoor Record at 5.91 m.

== Career ==
=== College ===
After competing at the 2013 World Championships, Barber failed to qualify for the final. At the 2014 Commonwealth Games in Glasgow he met with success, winning bronze as a 20-year-old in the event, clearing 5.45 m on the first attempt but failing at 5.55.

In March 2015 at the NCAA Indoor Championships, Barber's 5.91 set a personal best, an NCAA collegiate record, and a Canadian indoor record. Later that month at the 2015 Texas Relays, his 5.90 set a Canadian outdoor record (beating his own 5.71 from 2013) and set a world-leading number for the outdoor season. After the Texas event, he said, "You know, six months ago if you asked me if I'd be jumping at 5.90 consistently, I would have told you 'No way.' But it's funny how things happen, and I couldn't be more grateful to be where I am right now... Hopefully I can stay healthy and keep it up, and keep raising the bar."

Barber was the 2015 USTFCCCA Great Lakes Regional Field Athlete of the Year. At the 2015 NCAA outdoor finals in June, Barber won the event with a vault of 5.60 metres. With this victory added to his 2014 and 2015 NCAA indoor titles, Barber became the only three-time NCAA champion for the University of Akron.

=== Pan Am and World success ===
The 2015 Pan American Games took place on Canadian soil in Toronto, Ontario. Barber jumped to a 5.80 there, tying the Pan Am record that Lázaro Borges had set in 2011. Barber had missed his 5.40 vault very badly in the early rounds, bringing on some nerves to both himself and the home crowd. He later explained the slip-up as a result of earlier applying sunscreen with some residue remaining on his hands. Barber turned professional and signed with Nike in August 2015, a year short of completing his college degree.

Following the Pan American games in Toronto, Barber next competed in the 2015 World Championships in Athletics taking place in Beijing, where he won the world title with a jump of 5.90 m. This was Canada's first world title in athletics since 2003, though Derek Drouin would match Barber's gold later on in the high jump in Beijing. After the win, Barber said, "I don't think it has sunk in quite yet, and I'm looking forward to the next few days when it does. I was fortunate to be very consistent throughout the meet. That was the name of the game. I came in knowing that it was going to be a meet that came down to first attempts. I couldn't have asked for a better competition."

Barber cleared six metres for the first time in January 2016 at the Pole Vault Summit, improving his own national record and becoming the youngest athlete ever to reach that height indoors. Barber took this momentum into the 2016 IAAF World Indoor Championships. There had been a growing rivalry between himself and France's Renaud Lavillenie since the outdoor world championships, though here in the indoor event Barber did not meet those expectations. He finished fourth while Lavillenie would go on to win the event. Barber was disappointed after, saying that "The nerves were definitely there. Anytime you get together with this group of guys and you start jumping at these heights, it's definitely a nervous event. Coming through on those third attempts definitely helped, and it taught me a lot about my jumping style, and gives me a good platform to go on outdoors."

=== Olympics ===
At the 2016 Summer Olympics in Rio de Janeiro, Barber placed tenth in wet and windy conditions. He cleared 5.50 metres before missing on all three attempts at 5.65. After the Games, Canada's Sport Dispute Resolution Centre announced that Barber had tested positive for cocaine prior to the Games, but was permitted to compete as the use was found to be inadvertent. Barber avoided a multi-year suspension, successfully attributing the low-level cocaine violation to an intimate encounter with a woman he had met on Craigslist the night before Olympic trials.

== Personal life and death ==
Barber held dual Canadian-American citizenship, having been born in Las Cruces, New Mexico, to a father, George, who grew up in El Paso, Texas, but was himself born in Kincardine, Ontario. When Barber was 10, his mother Ann divorced his father, and Shawn moved to New Caney, Texas, having already learned pole vaulting under his father's instruction. Shawn split his time growing up between the Toronto area and the United States, and graduated from Kingwood Park High School in Houston. He later referred to Toronto as his hometown and said he chose to represent Canada because his particular sport was more important there, and to follow in the footsteps of his father, who was a pole vaulter for Canada at the 1983 World Championships and a competitor twice at Team Canada Summer Olympic trials.

Barber came out as gay in April 2017, the year after his own Summer Olympics. He took a break from competition in 2019 because of ankle injuries and family issues, after which his return in 2020 was cut short by the COVID-19 pandemic shutdowns.

On 17 January 2024, Barber died at his home in Kingwood, Texas, from medical complications following a period of ill health with no further details disclosed. He was 29.

== Competition record ==
Year	Competition	Venue	Position	Notes
Representing Canada except where noted
2012	World Junior Championships	Barcelona, Spain	3rd	5.55 m
2013	Universiade	Kazan, Russia	11th	5.15 m
2013	World Championships	Moscow, Russia	27th (qual)	5.40 m
2013	Pan American Junior Championships	Medellin, Colombia	1st	5.35 m
2013	Jeux de la Francophonie	Nice, France	2nd	5.20 m
2014	NCAA Indoor Championships (Note: Representing the University of Akron)	Albuquerque, United States	1st	5.75 m
2014	Commonwealth Games	Glasgow, United Kingdom	3rd	5.45 m
2015	NCAA Indoor Championships	Fayetteville, United States	1st	5.91 m
2015	Texas Relays	Austin, United States	1st	5.90 m
2015	NCAA Outdoor Championships	Eugene, United States	1st	5.60 m
2015	Pan American Games	Toronto, Canada	1st	5.80 m
2015	Diamond League	London, United Kingdom	2nd	5.93 m (Note: Canadian outdoor record through 2024)
2015	World Championships	Beijing, China	1st	5.90 m
2016	Pole Vault Summit	Reno, United States	1st	6.00 m (Note: Canadian indoor record through 2024)
2016	World Indoor Championships	Portland, United States	4th	5.75 m
2016	World Indoor Tour	Karlsruhe, Germany; Boston, United States; Stockholm, Sweden; Glasgow, United Kingdom	Overall 1st	5.89 m
2016	Olympic Games	Rio de Janeiro, Brazil	10th	5.50 m
2017	World Championships	London, United Kingdom	8th	5.65 m
2018	World Indoor Championships	Birmingham, United Kingdom	15th	5.45 m
2018	Commonwealth Games	Gold Coast, Australia	2nd	5.65 m
2018	NACAC Championships	Toronto, Canada	2nd	5.40 m
2018	Diamond League	Brussels, Belgium	3rd	5.83 m
2018	IAAF Continental Cup (Note: Representing the Americas)	Ostrava, Czech Republic	3rd	5.65 m
