= Adrián Vallés (pole vaulter) =

Spanish pole vaulter

Personal information
- Born: 16 March 1995 (age 31) Pamplona, Spain
- Education: University of Cincinnati
- Height: 193 cm (6 ft 4 in)
- Weight: 82 kg (181 lb)

Sport
- Sport: Track and field
- Event: Pole vault
- College team: Cincinnati Bearcats
- Club: Giulia&Us Pamplona AT
- Coached by: Francisco Hernández
- Updated on 29 August 2015

Adrián Vallés Iñarrea (born 16 March 1995 in Pamplona) is a Spanish athlete specialising in the pole vault. He competed at the 2015 World Championships in Beijing without qualifying for the final.

His personal bests in the event are 5.65 metres outdoors (Storrs 2015) and 5.47 metres indoors (Columbus 2015).

Vallés was an All-American vaulter for the Cincinnati Bearcats track and field team, placing runner-up at the 2017 NCAA Division I Outdoor Track and Field Championships. He retired from pole vault in 2023 to focus on his work as a data engineer.

== Competition record ==
| Year | Competition | Venue | Position | Notes |
Representing Spain
| 2013 | European Junior Championships | Rieti, Italy | 19th (q) | 4.60 m |
| 2014 | World Junior Championships | Eugene, United States | 17th (q) | 5.10 m |
| 2015 | European U23 Championships | Tallinn, Estonia | 3rd | 5.50 m |
| 2015 | World Championships | Beijing, China | 31st (q) | 5.40 m |
| 2016 | European Championships | Amsterdam, Netherlands | 11th | 5.30 m |
| 2017 | European U23 Championships | Bydgoszcz, Poland | 3rd | 5.50 m |
| 2017 | World Championships | London, United Kingdom | 16th (q) | 5.60 m |
| 2018 | European Championships | Berlin, Germany | – | NM |
