= 2023 European Athletics Indoor Championships – Men's pole vault =

Men's pole vault at the 2023 European Athletics Indoor Championships
- Venue: Ataköy Athletics Arena
- Location: Istanbul, Turkey
- Dates: 4 March 2023 (qualification); 5 March 2023 (final)
- Competitors: 17 from 12 nations
- Winning mark: 5.80 m

Medalists
gold medal	Sondre Guttormsen	Norway
silver medal	Emmanouil Karalis	Greece
silver medal	Piotr Lisek	Poland

The men's pole vault event at the 2023 European Athletics Indoor Championships was held on 4 March at 09:04 (qualification) and on 5 March at 19:18 local time.

== Records ==
Standing records prior to the 2023 European Athletics Indoor Championships
World record	Armand Duplantis (SWE)	6.22	Clermont-Ferrand, France	25 February 2023
European record	Armand Duplantis (SWE)	6.22	Clermont-Ferrand, France	25 February 2023
Championship record	Armand Duplantis (SWE)	6.05	Toruń, Poland	7 March 2021
World Leading	Armand Duplantis (SWE)	6.22	Clermont-Ferrand, France	25 February 2023
European Leading	Armand Duplantis (SWE)	6.22	Clermont-Ferrand, France	25 February 2023

== Results ==
=== Qualification ===
Qualification: Qualifying performance 5.75 (Q) or at least 8 best performers (q) advance to the Final.

Rank	Athlete	Nationality	5.20	5.40	5.55	5.65	5.75	Result	Note
1	Emmanouil Karalis	Greece	–	o	o	o	o	5.75	Q
1	Torben Blech	Germany	–	xo	o	o	o	5.75	Q
3	Ben Broeders	Belgium	–	o	o	xo	o	5.75	Q
4	Claudio Stecchi	Italy	–	o	o	o	xo	5.75	Q
5	Ethan Cormont	France	–	o	xo	o	xo	5.75	Q, SB
6	Sondre Guttormsen	Norway	–	o	–	o	xx–	5.65	q
6	Pål Haugen Lillefosse	Norway	–	o	o	o	xxx	5.65	q
6	Piotr Lisek	Poland	–	o	o	o	xxx	5.65	q
6	Bo Kanda Lita Baehre	Germany	–	o	o	o	xx–	5.65	q
10	Thibaut Collet	France	–	o	xo	o	xxx	5.65	
11	Ersu Şaşma	Turkey	–	xxo	o	xxx		5.55	SB
11	Menno Vloon	Netherlands	–	xxo	o	xxx		5.55	
13	Dominik Alberto	Switzerland	o	o	xxx			5.40	
14	Urho Kujanpää	Finland	xo	xo	xxx			5.40	
15	Valentin Lavillenie	France	–	xxo	–	x–	xx	5.40	
16	Robert Renner	Slovenia	xo	xxx				5.20	
	Gillian Ladwig	Germany	–	xxx				NM	

=== Final ===
Rank	Athlete	Nationality	5.40	5.60	5.70	5.80	5.85	5.91	Result	Note
1st place, gold medalist(s)	Sondre Guttormsen	Norway	o	–	o	o	xx–	x	5.80	
2nd place, silver medalist(s)	Emmanouil Karalis	Greece	o	xo	o	o	xxx		5.80	
2nd place, silver medalist(s)	Piotr Lisek	Poland	o	o	x–	o	xxx		5.80	SB
4	Torben Blech	Germany	xo	o	xo	o	xxx		5.80	
5	Ethan Cormont	France	o	o	o	xxx			5.70	
6	Claudio Stecchi	Italy	–	o	xo	x–	xx		5.70	
7	Pål Haugen Lillefosse	Norway	o	o	x–	x–	x		5.60	
8	Ben Broeders	Belgium	o	xxo	–	xxx			5.60	
9	Bo Kanda Lita Baehre	Germany	o	xxx					5.40	
