= Track and field at the 2011 Military World Games – Men's pole vault =

The men's pole vault event at the 2011 Military World Games was held on 23 July at the Estádio Olímpico João Havelange.

== Records ==
Prior to this competition, the existing world and CISM record were as follows:

World Record	Sergey Bubka (UKR)	6.14	Sestriere, Italy	31 July 1994
CISM World Record	Jean Galfione (FRA)	5.70	Rome, Italy	September 1995

== Schedule ==
Date	Time	Round
23 July 2011	09:00	Final

== Medalists ==
Gold	Silver	Bronze
Paweł Wojciechowski; Poland	Łukasz Michalski; Poland	Fábio Gomes da Silva; Brazil

== Results ==
=== Final ===
Rank	Athlete	Nationality	4.40	4.60	4.80	5.00	5.10	5.20	5.30	5.40	5.50	5.55	5.60	5.65	5.70	5.81	5.91	Mark	Notes
1st place, gold medalist(s)	Paweł Wojciechowski	Poland	-	-	-	-	-	o	-	o	o	-	o	-	xxo	xo	xxx	5.81	CR
2nd place, silver medalist(s)	Łukasz Michalski	Poland	-	-	-	-	-	o	-	xo	-	o	-	o	xxx			5.65	
3rd place, bronze medalist(s)	Fábio Gomes da Silva	Brazil	-	-	-	-	-	-	xo	o	o	-	xo	-	xxx			5.60	
4	Sergio D'Orio	Italy	-	-	o	xo	xxo	o	xxx									5.20	
5	Giorgio Piantella	Italy	-	-	xx-	o	x-	xo	xx-	x								5.20	
6	Nicholas Frawley	United States	-	-	-	-	xo	xxx										5.10	
7	Denis Goossens	Belgium	-	-	o	o	xxx											5.00	
7	Yunlei Rong	China	-	-	o	o	xxx											5.00	
9	Mouhcine Cheaouri	Morocco	-	-	xxo	xxx												4.80	
	Olivier Frey	Switzerland	-	-	xxx													NM	
	Patrick Schutz	Switzerland	-	-	-	-	DNF											DNF	
