= 2016 European Athletics Championships – Men's pole vault =

Men's pole vault at the European Athletics Championships
- Venue: Olympic Stadium
- Location: Amsterdam
- Dates: 6 July (qualification); 8 July (final)
- Competitors: 28 from 17 nations
- Winning height: 5.60 m

Medalists
gold medal	Robert Sobera	Poland
silver medal	Jan Kudlička	Czech Republic
bronze medal	Robert Renner	Slovenia

The men's pole vault at the 2016 European Athletics Championships took place at the Olympic Stadium on 6 and 8 July.

== Records ==
Standing records prior to the 2016 European Athletics Championships
World record	Renaud Lavillenie (FRA)	6.16	Donetsk, Ukraine	15 February 2014
European record	Renaud Lavillenie (FRA)	6.16	Donetsk, Ukraine	15 February 2014
Championship record	Rodion Gataullin (RUS)	6.00	Helsinki, Finland	11 August 1994
World Leading	Renaud Lavillenie (FRA)	5.95	Angers, France	26 June 2016
European Leading	Renaud Lavillenie (FRA)	5.95	Angers, France	26 June 2016

== Schedule ==
Date	Time	Round
6 July 2016	17:50	Qualification
8 July 2016	19:10	Final

== Results ==
=== Qualification ===
Qualification: 5.65 m (Q) or best 12 performances (q)

Rank	Group	Name	Nationality	5.15	5.35	5.50	5.60	5.65	Result	Note
1	A	Renaud Lavillenie	France	–	–	–	o		5.60	q
2	A	Mareks Ārents	Latvia	o	o	o			5.50	q
2	A	Konstadinos Filippidis	Greece	–	o	o			5.50	q
2	A	Stanley Joseph	France	–	o	o			5.50	q
2	A	Robert Sobera	Poland	–	o	o			5.50	q
6	B	Ivan Horvat	Croatia	–	o	xo			5.50	q
6	A	Robert Renner	Slovenia	–	o	xo			5.50	q
6	B	Adrián Valles	Spain	o	o	xo			5.50	q, SB
9	B	Kévin Menaldo	France	–	xo	xo			5.50	q
9	B	Melker Svärd Jacobsson	Sweden	–	xo	xo	x		5.50	q
11	B	Arnaud Art	Belgium	–	o	xxo			5.50	q
12	A	Ben Broeders	Belgium	–	o	xxx			5.35	q
12	B	Karsten Dilla	Germany	–	o	xxx			5.35	q
12	B	Piotr Lisek	Poland	–	o	xxx			5.35	q
12	B	Paweł Wojciechowski	Poland	–	o	xxx			5.35	q
12	B	Jan Kudlička	Czech Republic	–	o	–	x		5.35	q
17	B	Luke Cutts	Great Britain	xxo	o	xxx			5.35	
17	B	Menno Vloon	Netherlands	xxo	o	xxx			5.35	
19	A	Michal Balner	Czech Republic	–	xo	xxx			5.35	
19	B	Diogo Ferreira	Portugal	o	xo	xxx			5.35	
19	A	Rasmus Wejnold Jørgensen	Denmark	o	xo	xxx			5.35	
19	B	Dimitrios Patsoukakis	Greece	–	xo	xxx			5.35	
19	A	Tobias Scherbarth	Germany	–	xo	xxx			5.35	
24	A	Dominik Alberto	Switzerland	o	xxx				5.15	
24	A	Lukáš Posekaný	Czech Republic	o	xxx				5.15	
24	B	Eirik Greibrokk Dolve	Norway	o	xxx				5.15	
27	A	Didac Salas	Spain	xo	xxx				5.15	
	A	Raphael Holzdeppe	Germany						DNS	

=== Final ===
Rank	Name	Nationality	5.30	5.50	5.60	5.70	5.75	Result	Note
1st place, gold medalist(s)	Robert Sobera	Poland	o	o	o	xxx		5.60	
2nd place, silver medalist(s)	Jan Kudlička	Czech Republic	o	o	xo	xxx		5.60	
3rd place, bronze medalist(s)	Robert Renner	Slovenia	o	o	xxx			5.50	
4	Ben Broeders	Belgium	xo	o	xxx			5.50	
4	Piotr Lisek	Poland	xo	o	xxx			5.50	
6	Mareks Ārents	Latvia	o	xxo	xxx			5.50	
7	Karsten Dilla	Germany	o	xxx				5.30	
7	Konstadinos Filippidis	Greece	o	xxx				5.30	
7	Ivan Horvat	Croatia	o	xxx				5.30	
7	Paweł Wojciechowski	Poland	o	xxx				5.30	
11	Arnaud Art	Belgium	xo	xxx				5.30	
11	Adrian Vallés	Spain	xo	xxx				5.30	
13	Stanley Joseph	France	xxo	xxx				5.30	
	Kévin Menaldo	France	–	xxx				NM	
	Renaud Lavillenie	France	–	–	–	–	xxx	NM	
	Melker Svärd Jacobsson	Sweden						DNS	
