= Paweł Wojciechowski (pole vaulter) =

Polish pole vaulter

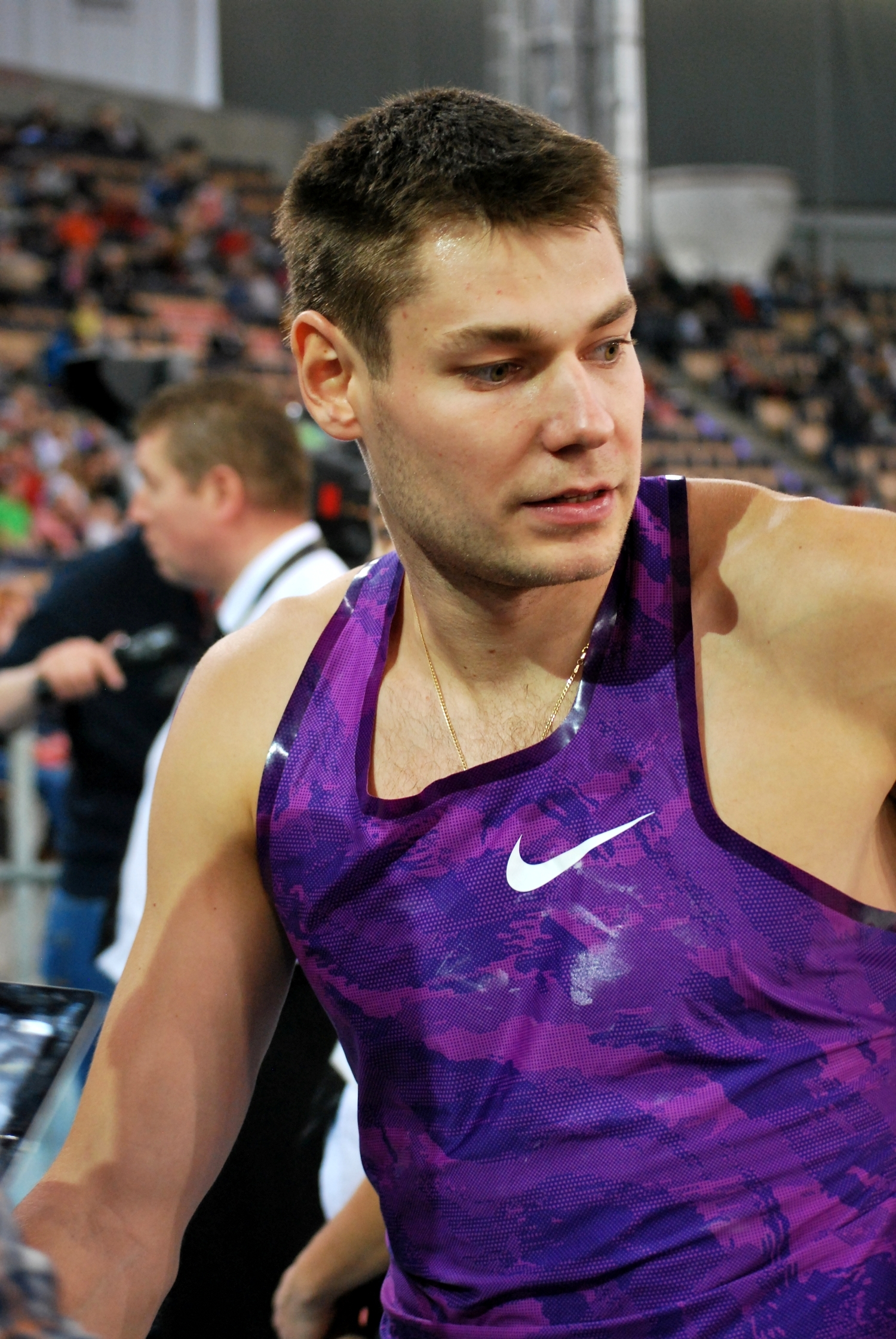
- Wojciechowski at the Pedro's Cup Łódź 2016

Personal information
- Nationality: Polish
- Born: 6 June 1989 (age 37) Bydgoszcz, Poland
- Height: 1.90 m (6 ft 3 in)
- Weight: 85 kg (187 lb) (2012)

Sport
- Sport: Athletics
- Event: Pole vault
- Club: Zawisza Bydgoszcz
Medal record
Men's athletics
Representing Poland
World Championships
Gold medal – first place	2011 Daegu	Pole vault
Bronze medal – third place	2015 Beijing	Pole vault
European Championships
Silver medal – second place	2014 Zürich	Pole vault
European Indoor Championships
Gold medal – first place	2019 Glasgow	Pole vault
Bronze medal – third place	2017 Belgrade	Pole vault
Military World Games
Gold medal – first place	2011 Rio de Janeiro	Pole vault
Gold medal – first place	2019 Wuhan	Pole vault
Bronze medal – third place	2015 Mungyeong	Pole vault
European U23 Championships
Gold medal – first place	2011 Ostrava	pole vault
World Junior Championships
Silver medal – second place	2008 Bydgoszcz	Pole vault

Paweł Wojciechowski (Polish pronunciation: [ˈpavɛw vɔjt͡ɕɛˈxɔfskʲi]; born 6 June 1989) is a Polish pole vaulter. He won the gold medal at the 2011 World Championships in Athletics.

== Career ==
Wojciechowski's first major success was the silver medal at the IAAF 12th World Junior Championships in Athletics held in July 2008 in Bydgoszcz, with the result 5.40 m (17 ft 8 1/2 in), being until then his personal best. He is an athlete of the Zawisza Bydgoszcz club. His coach is Roman Dakiniewicz.

In March 2009 it was announced, that Wojciechowski would be admitted to take practices in May 2009 with Vitaly Petrov, the pole vault coach of Sergey Bubka and Yelena Isinbayeva. He improved his best mark to 5.86 m at the Flanders Indoor Meeting in February 2011 to break Mirosław Chmara's Polish indoor record, which had stood for 22 years.

Wojciechowski was the surprise winner at the 2011 World Championships in Athletics, but he fared less well at the 2012 Summer Olympics, failing to record a mark in qualifying. He missed the 2013 season due to injury and did not defend his world title as a result. In 2014 he returned to form at the Orléans leg of the Perche Elite Tour, winning with a clearance of 5.76 m (18 ft 10 3/4 in) (his best since 2011). In 2015, he cleared 5.85 m to win bronze at the World Championships.

In 2017, he improved his personal best to 5.93 m.

== Achievements ==
Year	Competition	Venue	Position	Notes
2007	European Junior Championships	Hengelo, Netherlands	16th (q)	4.75 m
2008	World Junior Championships	Bydgoszcz, Poland	2nd	5.40 m (PB)
2011	European Indoor Championships	Paris, France	4th	5.71 m
2011	European U23 Championships	Ostrava, Czech Republic	1st	5.70 m (PB)
2011	World Championships	Daegu, South Korea	1st	5.90 m
2011	Military World Games	Rio de Janeiro, Brazil	1st	5.81 m
2012	Olympic Games	London, United Kingdom	Qual.	NM
2014	World Indoor Championships	Sopot, Poland	12th	5.40 m
2014	European Championships	Zürich, Switzerland	2nd	5.70 m
2015	World Championships	Beijing, China	3rd	5.80 m
2015	Military World Games	Mungyeong, South Korea	3rd	5.20 m
2016	European Championships	Amsterdam, Netherlands	7th	5.30 m
2016	Olympic Games	Rio de Janeiro, Brazil	16th (q)	5.45 m
2017	European Indoor Championships	Belgrade, Serbia	3rd	5.85 m (SB)
2017	World Championships	London, United Kingdom	5th	5.75 m
2018	World Indoor Championships	Birmingham, United Kingdom	13th	5.60 m
2018	European Championships	Berlin, Germany	5th	5.80 m
2019	European Indoor Championships	Glasgow, United Kingdom	1st	5.90 m (PB)
2019	World Championships	Doha, Qatar	13th (q)	5.70 m
2019	Military World Games	Wuhan, China	1st	5.60 m
2021	European Indoor Championships	Toruń, Poland	13th (q)	5.35 m
2021	Olympic Games	Tokyo, Japan	28th (q)	5.30 m
2023	World Championships	Budapest, Hungary	22nd (q)	5.35 m
2024	European Championships	Rome, Italy	21st (q)	5.25 m

== Personal bests ==
Outdoor

- 5.93 m (Lausanne 2017) NR

Indoor

- 5.90 m (Glasgow 2019)

Sporting positions
Preceded by (Australia) Steven Hooker	Men's Pole Vault Best Year Performance; 2011	Succeeded by (Germany) Björn Otto
