= 2012 World Junior Championships in Athletics – Men's pole vault =

The men's pole vault at the 2012 World Junior Championships in Athletics was held at the Estadi Olímpic Lluís Companys on 10 and 12 July.

== Medalists ==
Gold	Silver	Bronze
Thiago Braz; Brazil	Ivan Horvat; Croatia	Shawnacy Barber; Canada

== Records ==
Prior to the competition, the existing world junior and championship records were as follows.

World Junior Record	Maksim Tarasov (USSR)	5.80 m	Bryansk, Soviet Union	14 July 1989
World Junior Record	Raphael Holzdeppe (GER)	5.80 m	Biberach, Germany	28 June 2008
Championship Record	Germán Chiaraviglio (ARG)	5.71 m	Beijing, China	19 August 2006
World Junior Leading	Andrew Irwin (USA)	5.72 m	Baton Rouge, United States	13 May 2012

== Results ==
=== Qualification ===
Qualification: Standard 5.20 m (Q) or at least best 12 qualified (q)

Rank	Group	Name	Nationality	4.75	4.95	5.05	5.15	Result	Note
1	A	Thibault Boisseau	France	o	o	o	o	5.15	q
1	B	Andreas Duplantis	Sweden	–	–	o	o	5.15	q
1	B	Ivan Horvat	Croatia	o	o	o	o	5.15	q
4	A	Shawnacy Barber	Canada	o	o	xo	o	5.15	q
4	B	Robert Renner	Slovenia	–	xo	o	o	5.15	q
6	A	Didac Salas	Spain	–	–	xxo	o	5.15	q
6	B	Theodoros-Panayiotis Hrisanthopoulos	Greece	o	–	xxo	o	5.15	q
8	B	Jonas Efferoth	Germany	–	o	o	xo	5.15	q
9	A	Nikita Kirillov	United States	–	–	–	xxo	5.15	q
10	A	Arnaud Art	Belgium	–	xo	o	xxo	5.15	q
11	A	Lukas Hallanzy	Germany	–	xo	xxo	xxo	5.15	q, PB
12	A	Melker Svärd Jacobsson	Sweden	–	–	o	xxx	5.05	q
12	B	Thiago Braz	Brazil	–	–	o	xxx	5.05	q
12	B	Ruben Miranda	Portugal	o	o	o	xxx	5.05	q, SB
15	B	Axel Chapelle	France	xo	o	xo	xxx	5.05	
16	A	Daiki Fujii	Japan	o	o	xxo	xxx	5.05	
17	A	Lukas Wirth	Austria	o	o	xxx		4.95	
17	B	Menno Vloon	Netherlands	–	o	xxx		4.95	
19	A	Vladislav Mandych	Ukraine	xo	o	xxx		4.95	
20	A	Rutger Koppelaar	Netherlands	xxo	o	xxx		4.95	
21	A	Doo-hyun Han	South Korea	o	xo	xxx		4.95	
22	A	Karol Pawlik	Poland	xo	xo	xxx		4.95	
22	B	Eirik Greibrokk Dolve	Norway	xo	xo	xxx		4.95	
24	A	Alessandro Sinno	Italy	o	xxo	xxx		4.95	
24	B	Casey Bowen	United States	o	xxo	xxx		4.95	
24	B	Manel Miralles	Spain	o	xxo	xxx		4.95	
27	A	Per Magne Florvaag	Norway	xo	xxx			4.75	
27	B	Nicholas Southgate	New Zealand	xo	xxx			4.75	
29	A	Andreas Ronning	Denmark	xxo	xxx			4.75	
	B	Brodie Cross	Australia	xxx				NM	
	B	Wei Zhang	China	–	–	xxx		NM	

=== Final ===
Rank	Name	Nationality	4.85	5.00	5.10	5.20	5.30	5.35	5.40	5.45	5.50	5.55	5.60	5.65	Result	Notes
1st place, gold medalist(s)	Thiago Braz	Brazil	–	-	o	o	o	-	xo	o	xo	o	-	xxx	5.55	NJ
2nd place, silver medalist(s)	Ivan Horvat	Croatia	-	o	o	o	xo	-	xxo	-	xo	o	xxx		5.55	
3rd place, bronze medalist(s)	Shawnacy Barber	Canada	–	o	-	xo	o	o	xo	o	xo	xxo	xxx		5.55	NJ
4	Didac Salas	Spain	–	–	o	-	o	-	o	x-	xo	xx-	x		5.50	
5	Robert Renner	Slovenia	-	o	-	o	o	-	xo	x-	xx				5.40	
6	Melker Svärd Jakobsson	Sweden	–	xo	o	xxo	-	xxo	-	xxx					5.35	PB
7	Thibault Boisseau	France	-	o	-	xo	o	x-	xx						5.30	PB
8	Nikita Kirillov	United States	-	-	o	o	xxo	-	xxx						5.30	
9	Jonas Efferoth	Germany	-	o	xo	o	xxx								5.20	SB
10	Andreas Duplantis	Sweden	-	xo	o	xo	x-	xx							5.20	
11	Theódoros-Panayiótis Hrisanthópoulos	Greece	o	-	o	xxx									5.10	
12	Lukas Hallanzy	Germany	o	o	xo	xxx									5.10	
13	Rubem Miranda	Portugal	o	o	xxx										5.00	
	Arnaud Art	Belgium	-	xxx											NM	

== Participation ==
According to an unofficial count, 31 athletes from 24 countries participated in the event.

- Australia (1)
- Austria (1)
- Belgium (1)
- Brazil (1)
- Canada (1)
- China (1)
- Croatia (1)
- Denmark (1)
- France (2)
- Germany (2)
- Greece (1)
- Italy (1)
- Japan (1)
- Netherlands (2)
- New Zealand (1)
- Norway (2)
- Poland (1)
- Portugal (1)
- Slovenia (1)
- South Korea (1)
- Spain (2)
- Sweden (2)
- Ukraine (1)
- United States (2)
