= Ivan Horvat (pole vaulter) =

Croatian pole vaulter (born 1993)

Personal information
- Nationality: Croatian
- Born: 17 August 1993 (age 32) Osijek, Croatia
- Height: 1.83 m (6 ft 0 in) (2012)
- Weight: 66 kg (146 lb) (2012)
- Website: www.ivanhorvat.net

Sport
- Country: Croatia
- Sport: Track and field
- Event: Pole vault
- Club: AK Slavonija-Žito
- Coached by: Hrvoje Livančić

Achievements and titles
- Highest world ranking: 19th (2015)
- Personal best(s): Outdoor: 5.71 NR (2018); Indoor: 5.76 NR (2017)
Medal record
Men's athletics
Representing Croatia
World Junior Championships
Silver medal – second place	2012 Barcelona	Pole vault
European Youth Olympic Festival
Silver medal – second place	2009 Tampere	Pole vault

Ivan Horvat (born 17 August 1993 in Osijek) is a Croatian pole vaulter. He won the silver medal at the 2012 World Junior Athletics Championship in Barcelona. He also competed at the 2012 Summer Olympics where he finished 20th, and the 2016 Olympic Games in Rio de Janeiro.

== Career ==
He won the silver medal in the pole vault at the in 2012 World Junior Championships in Athletics in Barcelona, Spain, with a clearance of 5.55 metres. He cleared 5.35 metres on his Olympic debut at the 2012 Summer Games in London, England.

In 2015, Horvat made it to the final of the 2015 World Athletics Championship in Beijing, China, with the new national record of 5.70 metres.

He cleared 5.30 metres to place seventh overall at the 2016 European Athletics Championships in Amsterdam, Netherlands. He subsequently competed the 2016 Olympic Games in Rio de Janeiro where he cleared 5.30 metres but did not progress to the final.

He placed seventh overall at the 2017 European Indoor Championships in Belgrade, Serbia with a best height of 5.75 metres. He competed at the 2017 World Championships in Athletics in London, but did not reach the final.

He had a best jump of 5.36 metres at the 2018 European Athletics Championships in Berlin, but it was not sufficient to make the final. In July 2018, he increased his Croatian outdoor national record to 5.71 metres.

He competed at the 2019 European Athletics Indoor Championships in Glasgow, Scotland, but did not qualify through to the final.

He jumped 5.40 metres to win the second division of the 2023 European Athletics Team Championships in Silesia, Poland.

He competed at the 2024 European Athletics Championships in Rome, Italy, but failed to record s jump and did not proceed to the final.

== Competition record ==
Year	Competition	Venue	Position	Notes
Representing Croatia
2010	Youth Olympic Games	Singapore	8th	4.70 m
2011	European Junior Championships	Tallinn, Estonia	–	NM
2012	World Junior Championships	Barcelona, Spain	2nd	5.55 m
2012	Olympic Games	London, United Kingdom	20th (q)	5.35 m
2013	Balkan Indoor Championships	Istanbul, Turkey	1st	5.60 m
2013	European Indoor Championships	Gothenburg, Sweden	9th (q)	5.60 m
2013	European U23 Championships	Tampere, Finland	10th	5.20 m
2013	World Championships	Moscow, Russia	–	NM
2015	European U23 Championships	Tallinn, Estonia	5th	5.40 m
2015	World Championships	Beijing, China	9th	5.65 m
2016	European Championships	Amsterdam, Netherlands	7th	5.30 m
2016	Olympic Games	Rio de Janeiro, Brazil	27th (q)	5.30 m
2017	European Indoor Championships	Belgrade, Serbia	7th	5.75 m
2017	World Championships	London, United Kingdom	22nd (q)	5.45 m
2018	European Championships	Berlin, Germany	22nd (q)	5.36 m
2019	European Indoor Championships	Glasgow, United Kingdom	12th (q)	5.35 m
2024	European Championships	Rome, Italy	–	NM
