= Piotr Lisek =

Polish pole vaulter (born 1992)

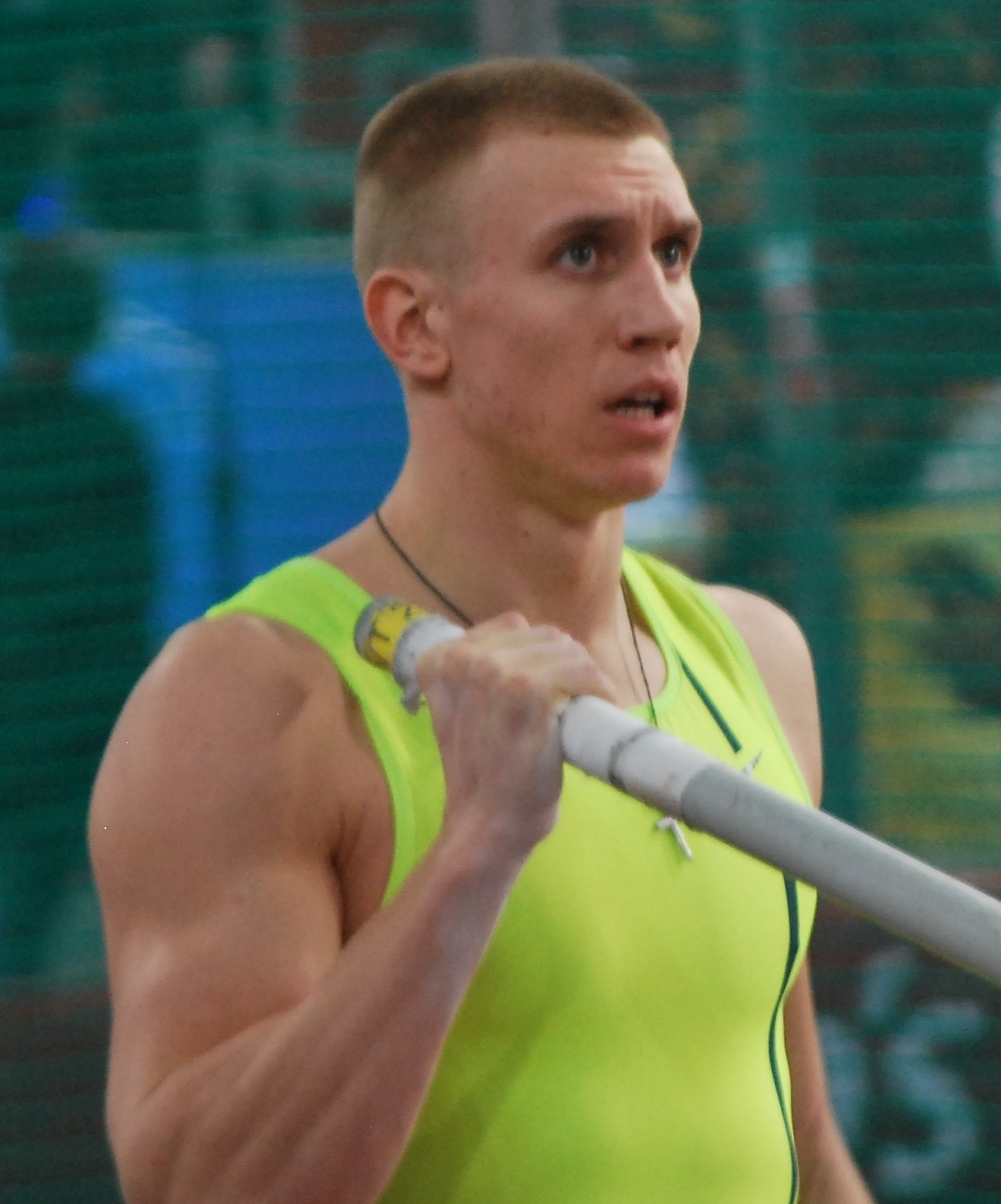
- Lisek in 2015

Personal information
- Nationality: Polish
- Born: 16 August 1992 (age 34) Duszniki, Greater Poland Voivodeship, Poland
- Height: 1.94 m (6 ft 4 in)
- Weight: 94 kg (207 lb)

Sport
- Country: Poland
- Sport: Athletics
- Event: Pole vault
- Club: OSOT Szczecin
- Coached by: Marcin Szczepański (2015–)

Achievements and titles
- Personal best: Pole vault: 6.02 m (2019)
Medal record
Men's athletics
Representing Poland
World Championships
Silver medal – second place	2017 London	Pole vault
Bronze medal – third place	2015 Beijing	Pole vault
Bronze medal – third place	2019 Doha	Pole vault
World Indoor Championships
Bronze medal – third place	2016 Portland	Pole vault
Bronze medal – third place	2018 Birmingham	Pole vault
European Indoor Championships
Gold medal – first place	2017 Belgrade	Pole vault
Silver medal – second place	2019 Glasgow	Pole vault
Silver medal – second place	2023 Istanbul	Pole vault
Bronze medal – third place	2015 Prague	Pole vault
Bronze medal – third place	2021 Toruń	Pole vault

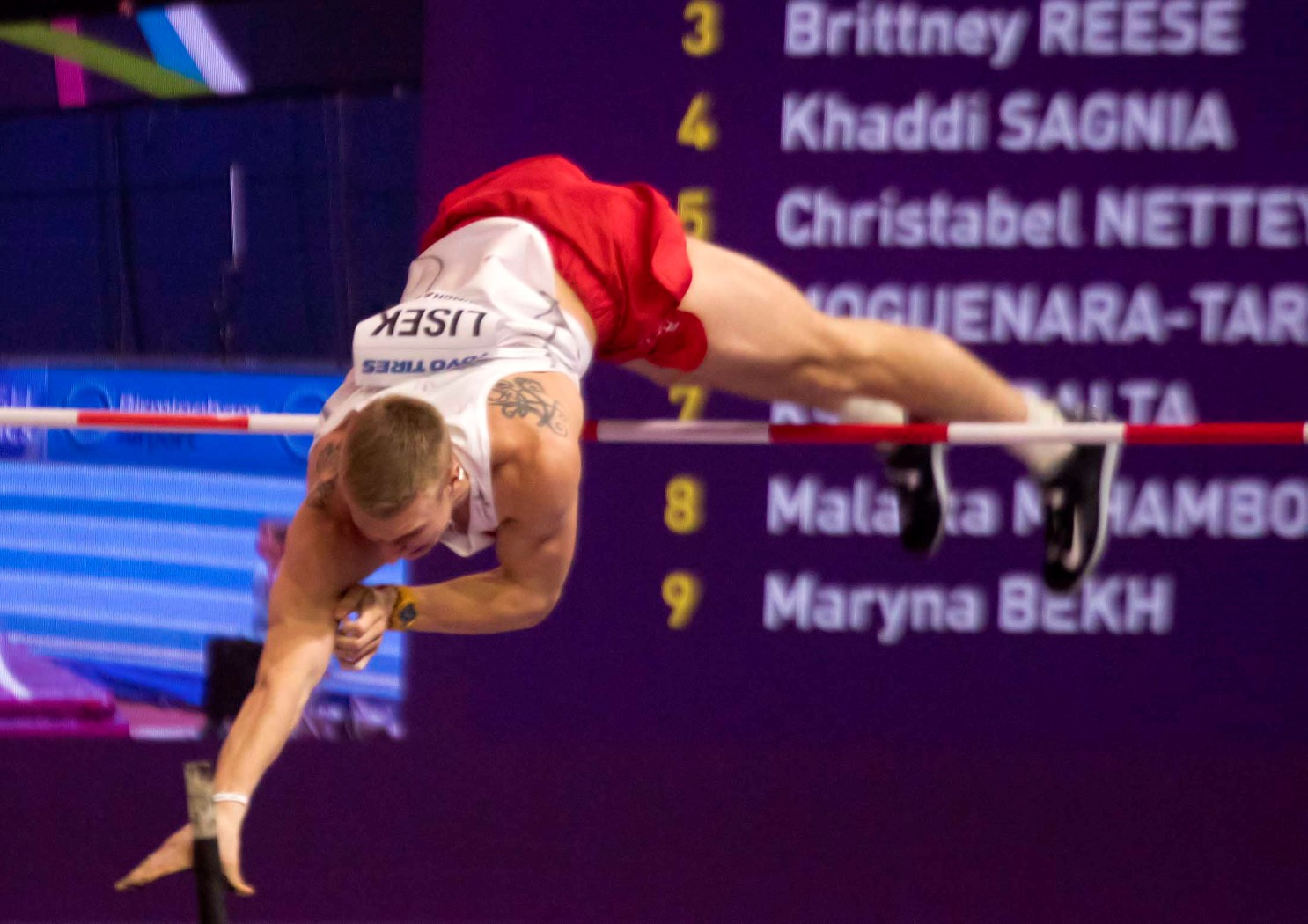
Piotr Lisek in 2018

Piotr Lisek (born 16 August 1992) is a Polish athlete specialising in the pole vault. He won bronze medals at the 2015 and 2019 World Championships and the silver medal at the 2017 World Championships. He is the first Polish vaulter to jump over 6 meters.

His personal bests in the event are 6.02 metres outdoors (Monaco 2019) and 6.00 metres indoors (Potsdam 2017).

== Career ==
Lisek began his career as a high jumper, but later switched to pole vault, having decided he was too short for his original event. He was coached by Vyacheslav Kalinichenko, who also trained Monika Pyrek, one of the most successful Polish female pole vaulters.

At the 2012 Polish Championships, he tested positive for an illegal substance, methylhexanamine, and was banned for six months. The athlete stated that he took the substance unknowingly in an energy drink and even listed it with the supplements he was using before the anti-doping control, which contributed to the reduced period of suspension.

Lisek's international debut was at the 2013 European Indoor Championships where he did not go through the qualifying round. Also at the 2013 European U23 Championships, he did not manage to reach the final. His big breakthrough came in 2014, when he jumped 5.77 metres in the indoor season. However, despite regularly jumping over 5.75 metres, he did not make the team for the 2014 IAAF World Indoor Championships, which took place in Poland, after no marking at the national championships. He had more success in the outdoor season, jumping 5.82 metres and finishing sixth at the 2014 European Championships. 2015 proved to be even more successful for the Polish vaulter with a new national indoor record of 5.90 metres and the bronze at the 2015 European Indoor Championships, his first international medal.

In February 2017, Lisek improved his personal record and jumped to a new Polish record, clearing 6.00 meters in Potsdam competition. Thus he became the 10th vaulter in history to clear 6.00 meters indoors. On 5 July 2019, during IAAF Diamond League meeting in Lausanne, Lisek cleared 6.01 meters, setting new Polish record and becoming the first Polish pole vaulter to clear 6 meters outdoors. One week later, he improved this record to 6.02 meters during a meeting in Monaco.

== Competition record ==
Year	Competition	Venue	Position	Notes
Representing Poland
2013	European Indoor Championships	Gothenburg, Sweden	12th (q)	5.50 m
2013	European U23 Championships	Tampere, Finland	17th (q)	5.20 m
2014	European Championships	Zürich, Switzerland	6th	5.65 m
2015	European Indoor Championships	Prague, Czech Republic	3rd	5.85 m
2015	World Championships	Beijing, China	3rd	5.80 m
2016	World Indoor Championships	Portland, United States	3rd	5.75 m
2016	European Championships	Amsterdam, Netherlands	4th	5.50 m
2016	Olympic Games	Rio de Janeiro, Brazil	4th	5.75 m
2017	European Indoor Championships	Belgrade, Serbia	1st	5.85 m
2017	World Championships	London, United Kingdom	2nd	5.89 m
2018	World Indoor Championships	Birmingham, United Kingdom	3rd	5.85 m
2018	European Championships	Berlin, Germany	4th	5.90 m
2019	European Indoor Championships	Glasgow, United Kingdom	2nd	5.85 m
2019	World Championships	Doha, Qatar	3rd	5.87 m
2021	European Indoor Championships	Toruń, Poland	3rd	5.80 m
2021	Olympic Games	Tokyo, Japan	6th	5.80 m
2022	World Championships	Eugene, United States	19th (q)	5.50 m
2022	European Championships	Munich, Germany	15th (q)	5.50 m
2023	European Indoor Championships	Istanbul, Turkey	2nd	5.80 m
2023	World Championships	Budapest, Hungary	9th	5.75 m
2024	World Indoor Championships	Glasgow, United Kingdom	–	NM
2024	European Championships	Rome, Italy	6th	5.75 m
2024	Olympic Games	Paris, France	15th (q)	5.60 m
2025	European Indoor Championships	Apeldoorn, Netherlands	13th (q)	5.65 m
2025	World Championships	Tokyo, Japan	13th (q)	5.70 m

== Mixed martial arts record ==
Professional record breakdown
2 matches	1 win	1 loss
By knockout	1	1

Res.	Record	Opponent	Method	Event	Date	Round	Time	Location	Notes
Loss	1–1	Adam Josef Modzelewski	KO (punches)	KSW 113	December 20, 2025	1	1:08	Łódź, Poland	Catchweight (220 lb) bout.
Win	1–0	Dariusz Kaźmierczuk	TKO (punches)	Fame Friday Arena 2	September 29, 2023	1	1:51	Szczecin, Poland	Catchweight (203 lb) bout.

== See also ==
- 6 metres club
