= Cole Walsh =

American pole vaulter (born 1995)

Personal information
- Born: June 14, 1995 (age 31) Glendale, Arizona, U.S.

Sport
- Country: United States
- Sport: Athletics
- Event: Pole vault
- College team: Oregon Ducks
- Club: Risen Performance
- Coached by: Nick Hysong

Achievements and titles
- Personal best: Pole vault: 5.83 m (2019)

Cole Walsh (born June 14, 1995) is an American athlete specializing in the pole vault.

== Biography ==
Cole Wash started his vaulting career at Brophy College Preparatory in Phoenix, Arizona. He continued on to University of Oregon where he was selected for the 2014 World Junior Championships in Athletics. He finished third at 2018 USA Outdoor Track and Field Championships, with his personal best of 5.75 m. He finished second at 2019 USA Outdoor Track and Field Championships with another jump of 5.76 m. His personal best (indoor) is 5.83 m, in Zürich, Switzerland. In 2020, he was given a three-month ban for breaking anti-doping regulations after testing positive for cannabis.
