= Alioune Sene =

French pole vaulter (born 1996)

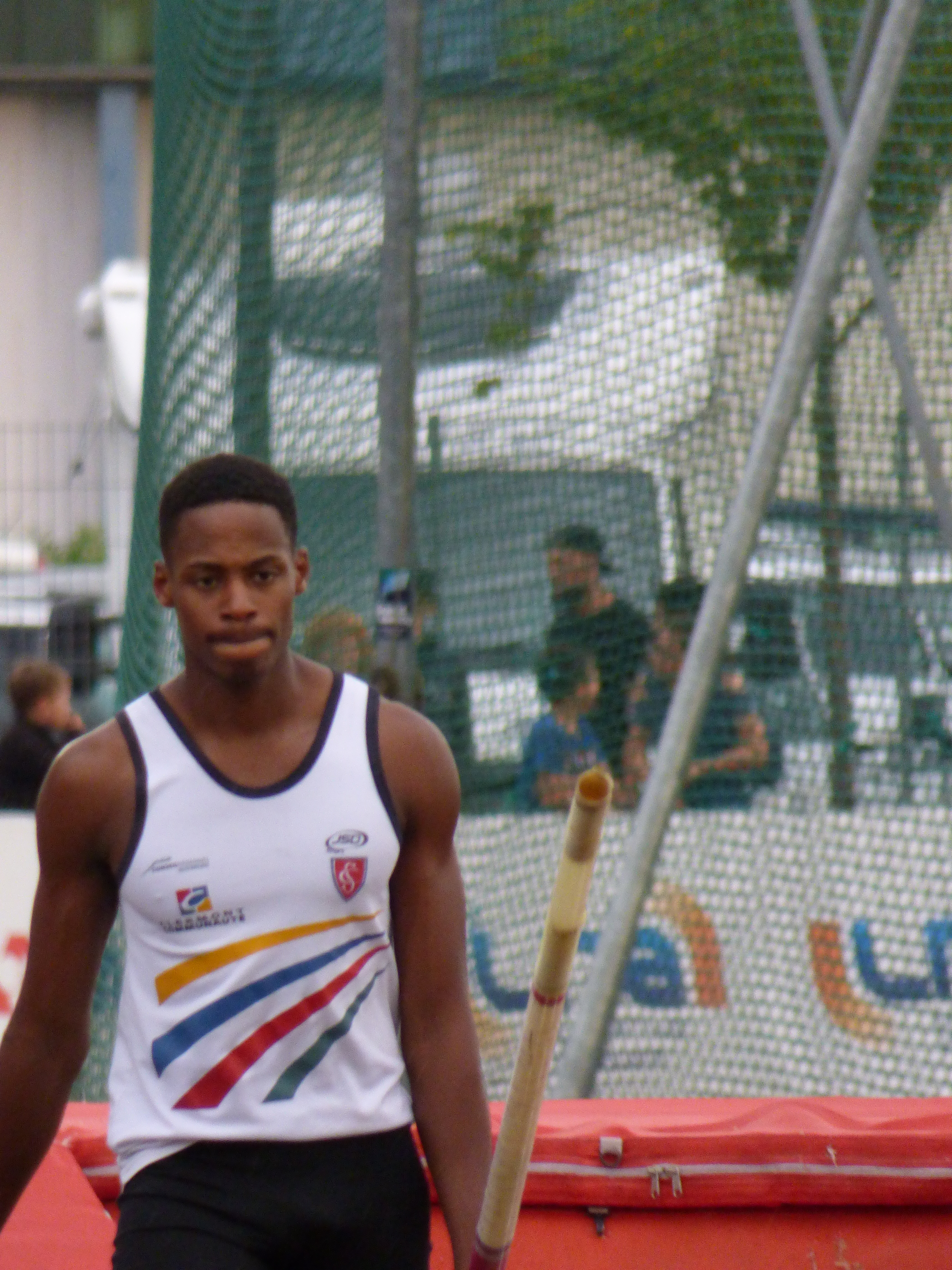
- Sene in 2017

Personal information
- Born: 3 February 1996 (age 30) Dakar, Senegal
- Height: 1.86 m (6 ft 1 in)
- Weight: 78 kg (172 lb)

Sport
- Sport: Athletics
- Event: Pole vault
- Coached by: Gérald Baudouin (2017–)

Alioune Sene (born 3 February 1996) is a French athlete specialising in the pole vault. He won a bronze medal at the 2015 European Junior Championships.

His personal bests in the event are 5.73 metres outdoors( Stade des Maradas, Cergy-Pontoise FRA 16 Jun 2021) ( and 5.76 metres indoors:Stadium Miramas Métropole, Miramas, FRA 27 February 2022)

== International competitions ==
Year	Competition	Venue	Position	Notes
Representing France
2013	World Youth Championships	Donetsk, Ukraine	19th (q)	4.50 m
2015	European Junior Championships	Eskilstuna, Sweden	3rd	5.30 m
2018	Mediterranean U23 Championships	Jesolo, Italy	1st	5.50 m
2018	European Championships	Berlin, Germany	12th	5.30 m
2019	European Indoor Championships	Glasgow, United Kingdom	14th (q)	5.35 m
2019	World Championships	Doha, Qatar	26th (q)	5.45 m
