= Mathieu Collet =

French pole vaulter (born 1995)

- Collet in 2026

Personal information
- Born: 15 March 1995 (age 31) La Tronche, France
- Height: 180 cm (5 ft 11 in)
- Weight: 72 kg (159 lb)

Sport
- Country: France
- Sport: Athletics
- Event: Pole vault
- Club: Entente Athletique Grenoble 38
- Coached by: Philippe Collet

Achievements and titles
- Personal best: Pole vault: 5.82 m (2026)
Medal record
Men's athletics
Representing France
Mediterranean Games
Gold medal – first place	2026 Taranto	Pole vault

Mathieu Collet (born 15 March 1995) is a French pole vaulter. He placed fourth overall at the 2026 European Athletics Championships.

== Biography ==
From Grenoble, he is a member of Entente Athletique Grenoble 38. He and his brother Thibaut Collet are coached by their father Philippe Collet, himself a former pole vaulter. In 2016, he was runner-up at the French Junior National Athletics Championships with a first-time clearance of 5.40 metres to finish behind Axel Chapelle.

Collet placed third in the pole vault at the 2019 French Indoor Athletics Championships and placed seventh representing France at the 2019 Summer Universiade in Italy. In February 2020, he cleared a personal best 5.74 metres while competing in Rouen. However, while training in the United States in April 2022, he had a fall from a broken pole vault that left him unsure of his future in the sport.

In February 2026, Collet improved his personal best by one centimeter in Clermont with a clearance of 5.75 metres. On 26 July, he cleared 5.82m to place second to his brother Thibaut at the French Championships in Albi. In August 2026, he competed at the 2026 European Athletics Championships in Birmingham, England, placing fourth overall on his first appearance for the senior French national team.
