= Robert Renner (athlete) =

Slovenian pole vaulter (born 1994)

Personal information
- Born: March 8, 1994 (age 32) Celje, Slovenia
- Height: 1.83 m (6 ft 0 in)
- Weight: 75 kg (165 lb)

Sport
- Country: Slovenia
- Event: Pole vault

Achievements and titles
- Personal best: 570
Medal record
Event	1st	2nd	3rd
European Championships	0	0	1
Total	0	0	1
European Championships
Bronze medal – third place	2016 Amsterdam	Pole vault
World Youth Championships
Gold medal – first place	2011 Lille	Pole vault
- Updated on 9 July 2016

Robert Renner (born 8 March 1994 in Celje) is a Slovenian athlete specialising in the pole vault.

== Career ==
He won the gold medal at the 2015 European U23 Championships.

His personal bests in the event are 5.70 metres outdoors (Beijing 2015) and 5.62 metres indoors (Villeurbanne 2013). Both are current national records.

== Competition record ==
Year	Competition	Venue	Position	Notes
Representing Slovenia
2011	World Youth Championships	Lille, France	1st	5.25 m
2011	European Youth Olympic Festival	Trabzon, Turkey	1st	5.31 m
2012	World Junior Championships	Barcelona, Spain	5th	5.40 m
2013	European Indoor Championships	Gothenburg, Sweden	16th (q)	5.50 m
2015	European Indoor Championships	Prague, Czech Republic	15th (q)	5.25 m
2015	European U23 Championships	Tallinn, Estonia	1st	5.55 m
2015	World Championships	Beijing, China	13th	5.50 m
2016	European Championships	Amsterdam, Netherlands	3rd	5.50 m
2016	Olympic Games	Rio de Janeiro, Brazil	22nd (q)	5.45 m
2022	World Championships	Eugene, United States	27th (q)	5.50 m
2022	European Championships	Munich, Germany	20th (q)	5.30 m
2023	European Indoor Championships	Istanbul, Turkey	16th (q)	5.20 m
