= 2015 World Championships in Athletics – Men's pole vault =

Men's pole vault at the 2015 World Championships
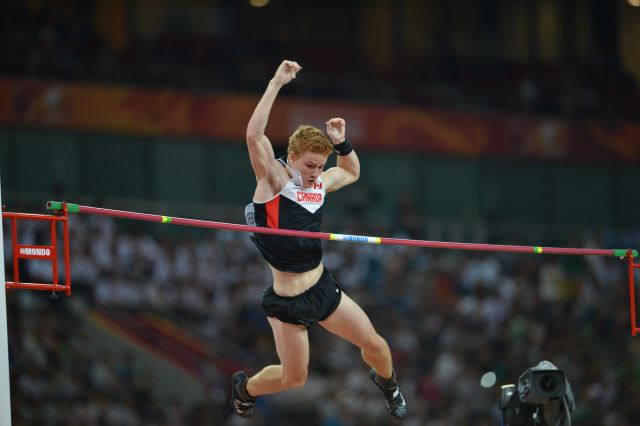
- Shawnacy Barber
- Venue: Beijing National Stadium
- Dates: 22 August (qualification); 24 August (final)
- Competitors: 34 from 21 nations
- Winning height: 5.90

Medalists
gold medal	Shawnacy Barber	Canada
silver medal	Raphael Holzdeppe	Germany
bronze medal	Paweł Wojciechowski	Poland
bronze medal	Renaud Lavillenie	France
bronze medal	Piotr Lisek	Poland

The men's pole vault at the 2015 World Championships in Athletics was held at the Beijing National Stadium on 22 and 24 August.

== Competition ==
World record holder and world leader Renaud Lavillenie set his opening height at 5.80, after most of the field had already attempted two heights. He cleared it with one foot to spare on his first attempt. It is believed to be the highest opening height ever attempted. At the end of that round, only six jumpers remained and three others, Shawnacy Barber, Piotr Lisek and 2011 winner Paweł Wojciechowski also had no misses. Returning champion Raphael Holzdeppe also was one of the six to clear 5.80, including several misses.

At the next height, 5.90, Lavillenie cleared the bar easily, but in the wrong position. Each time he knocked it off on his way down. Barber, the National High School Record holder and NCAA Champion from the University of Akron, cleared on his first attempt. On his last attempt Holzdeppe cleared 5.90 to stay in the competition, leaving a three-way tie for the bronze medal between Wojciechowski, Lisek, and Lavillenie.

Barber and Holzdeppe competed for the gold medal at a height of 6.00; both athletes failed to clear it on all three attempts, neither really getting off a serious attempt. Barber's initial success at 5.90 in the previous round gave him the gold medal over Holzdeppe.

== Records ==
Prior to the competition, the records were as follows:

World record	Renaud Lavillenie (FRA)	6.16	Donetsk, Ukraine	15 February 2014
Championship record	Dmitri Markov (AUS)	6.05	Edmonton, Canada	9 August 2001
World Leading	Renaud Lavillenie (FRA)	6.05	Eugene, OR, United States	30 May 2015
African record	Okkert Brits (RSA)	6.03	Cologne, Germany	18 August 1995
Asian record	Grigoriy Yegorov (KAZ)	5.90	Stuttgart, Germany	19 August 1993
North, Central American and Caribbean record	Brad Walker (USA)	6.04	Eugene, OR, United States	8 June 2008
South American record	Thiago Braz da Silva (BRA)	5.92	Baku, Azerbaijan	24 June 2014
European record	Renaud Lavillenie (FRA)	6.16	Donetsk, Ukraine	15 February 2014
Oceanian record	Dmitri Markov (AUS)	6.05	Edmonton, Canada	9 August 2001

== Qualification standards ==
Entry standards
5.65

== Schedule ==
Date	Time	Round
22 August 2015	18:40	Qualification
24 August 2015	19:05	Final

All times are local times (UTC+8)

== Results ==
KEY:	Q	Qualified	q	12 best performers	NR	National record	PB	Personal best	SB	Seasonal best

=== Qualification ===
Qualification: 5.70 m (Q) or at least 12 best performers (q).

Rank	Group	Name	Nationality	5.25	5.40	5.55	5.65	5.70	Mark	Notes
1	A	Sam Kendricks	United States	o	o	o	o	o	5.70	Q
1	B	Pawel Wojciechowski	Poland	-	o	o	o	o	5.70	Q
1	B	Renaud Lavillenie	France	-	-	-	-	o	5.70	Q
1	B	Jan Kudlička	Czech Republic	-	o	-	o	o	5.70	Q
1	B	Robert Sobera	Poland	-	o	o	o	o	5.70	Q
1	B	Robert Renner	Slovenia	-	o	o	o	o	5.70	Q, NR
7	B	Tobias Scherbarth	Germany	-	o	o	x-	o	5.70	Q, SB
7	A	Michal Balner	Czech Republic	-	o	o	xo	o	5.70	Q
7	A	Shawnacy Barber	Canada	-	o	o	xo	o	5.70	Q
7	A	Piotr Lisek	Poland	-	o	o	xo	o	5.70	Q
11	A	Augusto de Oliveira	Brazil	-	o	xxo	o	o	5.70	Q
12	A	Ivan Gertlein	Russia	xo	xo	xxo	xo	o	5.70	Q, PB
13	A	Germán Chiaraviglio	Argentina	o	o	o	o	xo	5.70	Q
14	A	Kévin Menaldo	France	-	o	xo	o	xo	5.70	Q
15	A	Ivan Horvat	Croatia	-	o	o	o	xxo	5.70	Q, NR
15	A	Raphael Holzdeppe	Germany	-	-	-	-	xxo	5.70	Q
17	B	Aleksandr Gripich	Russia	-	o	o	o	xxx	5.65	
17	B	Carlo Paech	Germany	-	-	o	o	xxx	5.65	
19	B	Thiago Braz da Silva	Brazil	-	-	xxo	o	xxx	5.65	
20	B	Hiroki Ogita	Japan	-	o	o	xo	xxx	5.65	SB
20	A	Brad Walker	United States	-	o	o	xo	xxx	5.65	
22	B	Yao Jie	China	xo	o	o	xo	xxx	5.65	PB
23	B	Georgiy Gorokhov	Russia	o	o	xxo	xxo	xxx	5.65	=PB
23	A	Seito Yamamoto	Japan	-	xo	xo	xxo	xxx	5.65	SB
25	A	Mareks Ārents	Latvia	o	o	o	xxx		5.55	
25	B	Konstadinos Filippidis	Greece	-	o	o	xxx		5.55	
27	B	Jacob Blankenship	United States	-	xo	o	xxx		5.55	
28	A	Zhang Wei	China	o	xxo	o	xxx		5.55	
29	A	Steven Lewis	Great Britain & N.I.	o	o	xxx			5.40	
30	B	Nikita Filippov	Kazakhstan	o	xo	xxx			5.40	
31	B	Adrián Vallés	Spain	o	xxo	-	xx-	x	5.40	
31	A	Arnaud Art	Belgium	-	xxo	xxx			5.40	
33	A	Fábio Gomes da Silva	Brazil	o	xxx				5.25	
33	B	Vladyslav Revenko	Ukraine	o	xxx				5.25	
	A	Natán Rivera	El Salvador	xxr					NM	

=== Final ===
The final was started at 19:05.

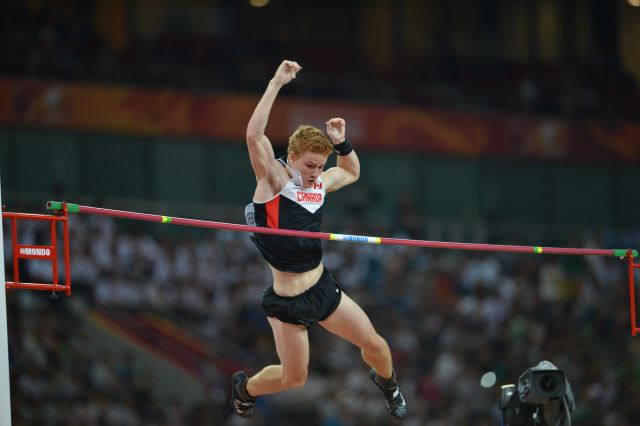
Gold medal winner, Shawnacy Barber

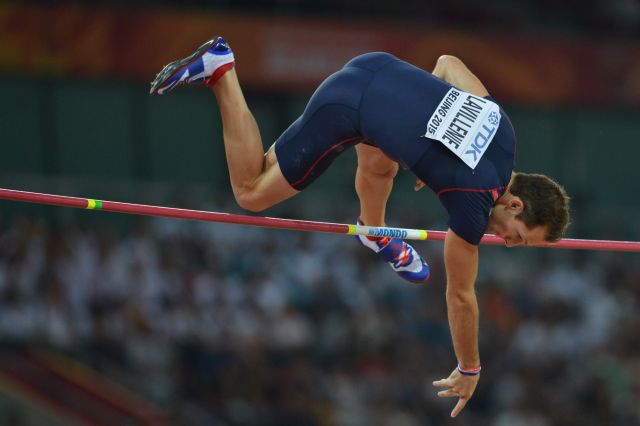
Renaud Lavillenie clearing his only height

Rank	Name	Nationality	5.50	5.65	5.80	5.90	6.00	Mark	Notes
1st place, gold medalist(s)	Shawnacy Barber	Canada	o	o	o	o	xxx	5.90	
2nd place, silver medalist(s)	Raphael Holzdeppe	Germany	-	o	xo	xxo	xxx	5.90	
3rd place, bronze medalist(s)	Paweł Wojciechowski	Poland	-	o	o	xxx		5.80	
3rd place, bronze medalist(s)	Renaud Lavillenie	France	-	-	o	xxx		5.80	
3rd place, bronze medalist(s)	Piotr Lisek	Poland	o	o	o	xxx		5.80	
6	Kévin Menaldo	France	o	o	xxo	xxx		5.80	
7	Michal Balner	Czech Republic	o	o	xxx			5.65	
7	Tobias Scherbarth	Germany	o	o	xxx			5.65	
9	Augusto de Oliveira	Brazil	xo	xo	xxx			5.65	
9	Ivan Horvat	Croatia	xo	xo	xxx			5.65	
9	Sam Kendricks	United States	xo	xo	xxx			5.65	
9	Germán Chiaraviglio	Argentina	xo	xo	xxx			5.65	
13	Jan Kudlička	Czech Republic	o	xxx				5.50	
13	Robert Renner	Slovenia	o	xxx				5.50	
15	Robert Sobera	Poland	xo	xxx				5.50	
	Ivan Gertlein	Russia	xxx					NM	
