= Georgiy Gorokhov =

Russian pole vaulter (born 1993)

Personal information
- Full name: Georgiy Olegovich Gorokhov
- Born: 20 April 1993 (age 33)

Sport
- Country: Russia
- Sport: Track and field
- Event: Pole vault
Medal record
Military World Games
Bronze medal – third place	2019 Wuhan	Pole vault

Georgiy Olegovich Gorokhov (Russian: Гео́ргий Оле́гович Горо́хов; born 20 April 1993) is a Russian athlete specialising in the pole vault. He competed at the 2015 World Championships in Beijing without qualifying for the final.

His personal bests in the event are 5.70 metres outdoors (Moscow 2018) and 5.70 metres indoors (Moscow 2016).

== Competition record ==
Year	Competition	Venue	Position	Notes
Representing Russia
2015	World Championships	Beijing, China	23rd (q)	5.65 m
Competing as Authorised Neutral Athlete
2018	European Championships	Berlin, Germany	17th (q)	5.36 m
2019	European Indoor Championships	Glasgow, United Kingdom	8th	5.55 m

== See also ==
- Russia at the 2015 World Championships in Athletics
