= Eirik Greibrokk Dolve =

Norwegian pole vaulter

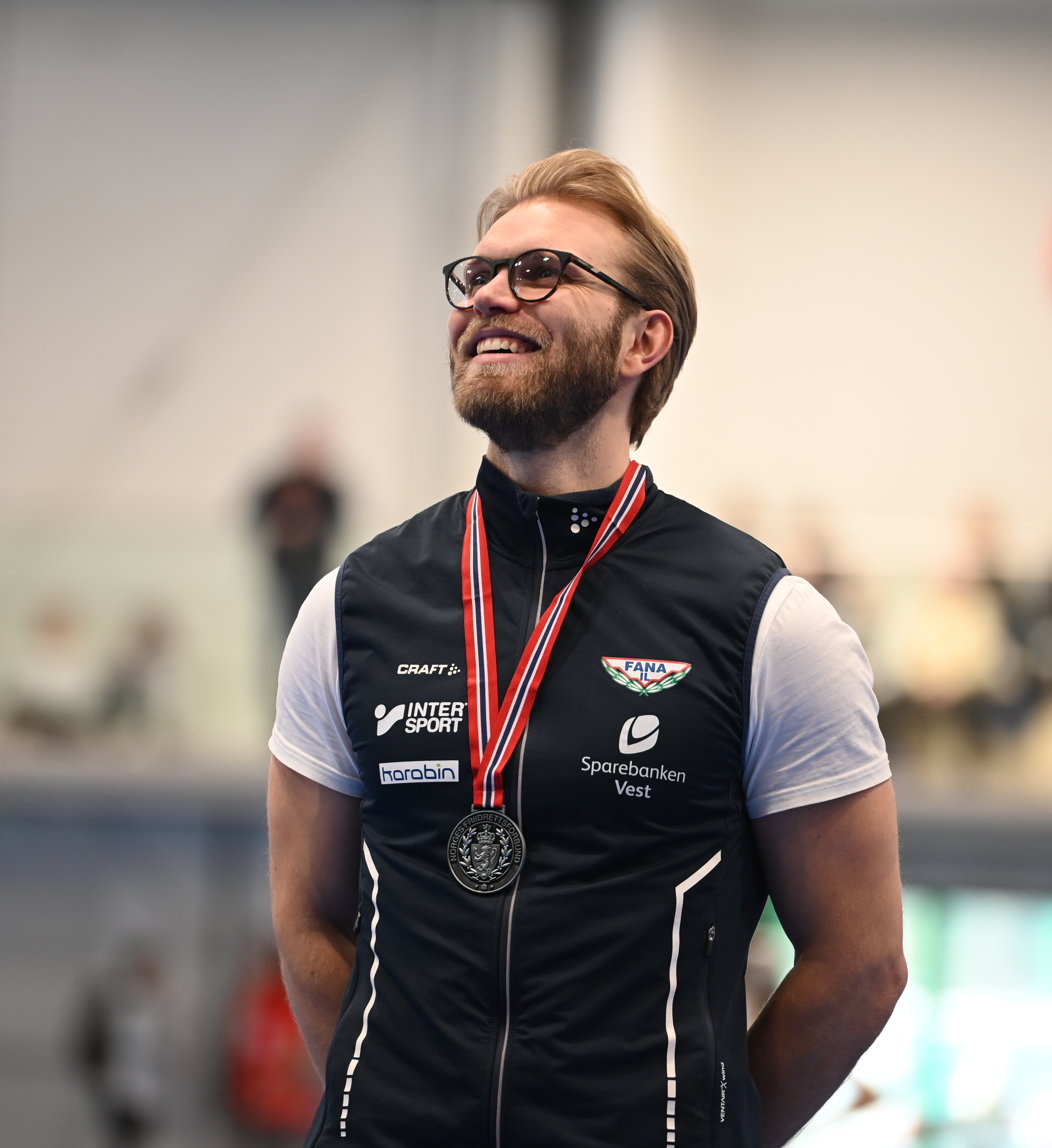
Eirik Dolve in 2026

Eirik Greibrokk Dolve (born 5 May 1995) is a Norwegian pole vaulter.

He won the 2013 European Junior Championships, finished ninth at the 2014 World Junior Championships, fourth at the 2015 European U23 Championships and eleventh at the 2017 European U23 Championships. He also competed at the 2011 World Youth Championships, the 2012 World Junior Championships, the 2015 European Indoor Championships and the 2016 European Championships without reaching the final.

He won the Norwegian championship title in 2013, 2014, 2015 and 2016. He represented the Bergen-based sports club IL Fri since childhood before switching in 2016 to Fana IL.

His personal best vault is 5.66 metres, achieved in June 2016 in Prague.
