= Axel Chapelle =

French pole vaulter (born 1995)

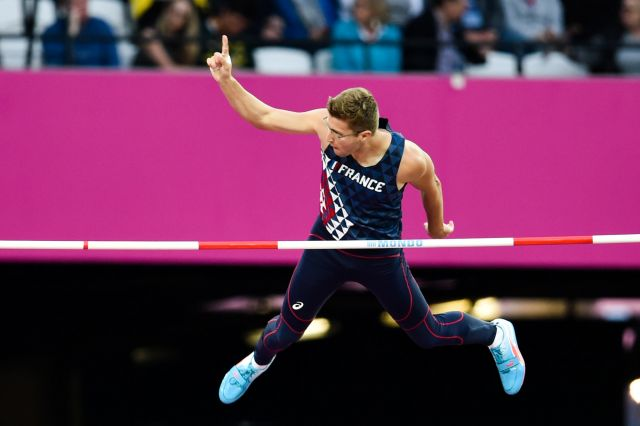
- Chapelle at the 2017 World Championships

Personal information
- Born: 24 April 1995 (age 31) Colombes, France
- Height: 182 cm (6 ft 0 in)
- Weight: 80 kg (176 lb)

Sport
- Country: France
- Sport: Athletics
- Event: Pole vault

Achievements and titles
- Personal best(s): Outdoor: 5.72 m (Monaco, 2017); Indoor: 5.88 m (Clermont-Ferrand, 2018)
Medal record
Men's athletics
Representing France
World Junior Championships
| Gold medal – first place | 2014 Oregon | Pole vault |
European Junior Championships
| Silver medal – second place | 2013 Rieti | Pole vault |

Axel Chapelle (French pronunciation: [ak.sɛl ʃa.pɛl]; born 24 April 1995) is a French pole vaulter.

== Career ==
Chapelle was born in Colombes and began pole vaulting in 2005, at the age of 10. He won his first major medal at the 2013 European Athletics Junior Championships in Rieti, Italy, with a vault of 5.25 m.

At the 2014 World Junior Championships in Athletics in Eugene, Oregon, Chapelle won his first major gold medal, vaulting to a world junior leading height of 5.55 m. He broke into tears as he listened to La Marseillaise, the national anthem of France, after he received his gold medal on top of the podium at Hayward Field. He became only the second pole vaulter to win a junior world title for France since Jean Galfione in 1990.

== Competition record ==
| Year | Competition | Venue | Position | Notes |
Representing France
| 2012 | World Junior Championships | Barcelona, Spain | 15th (q) | 5.05 m |
| 2013 | European Junior Championships | Rieti, Italy | 2nd | 5.25 m |
| 2014 | World Junior Championships | Eugene, United States | 1st | 5.55 m |
| 2015 | European U23 Championships | Tallinn, Estonia | 10th | 5.20 m |
| 2016 | Mediterranean U23 Championships | Tunis, Tunisia | 2nd | 5.41 m |
| 2017 | European Indoor Championships | Belgrade, Serbia | 6th | 5.80 m |
| 2017 | European U23 Championships | Bydgoszcz, Poland | 2nd | 5.60 m |
| 2017 | World Championships | London, United Kingdom | 6th | 5.65 m |
| 2018 | World Indoor Championships | Birmingham, United Kingdom | 10th | 5.60 m |
| 2018 | European Championships | Berlin, Germany | 8th | 5.65 m |
| 2019 | European Indoor Championships | Glasgow, United Kingdom | 10th (q) | 5.50 m |

== Personal life ==
Chapelle's older brother, Theo, is also a pole vaulter. They both train together at the EA Cergy Pontoise Athlétisme club in Paris and have equal personal bests of 5.55 m.

Sporting positions
| Preceded by (Brazil) Thiago Braz da Silva | World Junior Champion – Men's pole vault 26 July 2014–present | Succeeded by Incumbent |
