= Duplantis (surname) =

Duplantis is a French surname. Notable people with the surname include:

- Armand Duplantis (born 1999), American-born Swedish pole vaulter
- Jesse Duplantis (born 1949), American Evangelical Charismatic Christian minister
- Johanna Duplantis (born 2002), American-born Swedish athlete (sister of Armand)
- Steve Duplantis (1972–2008), Canadian professional golf caddy
