= Armand Duplantis =

Swedish and American pole vaulter (born 1999)

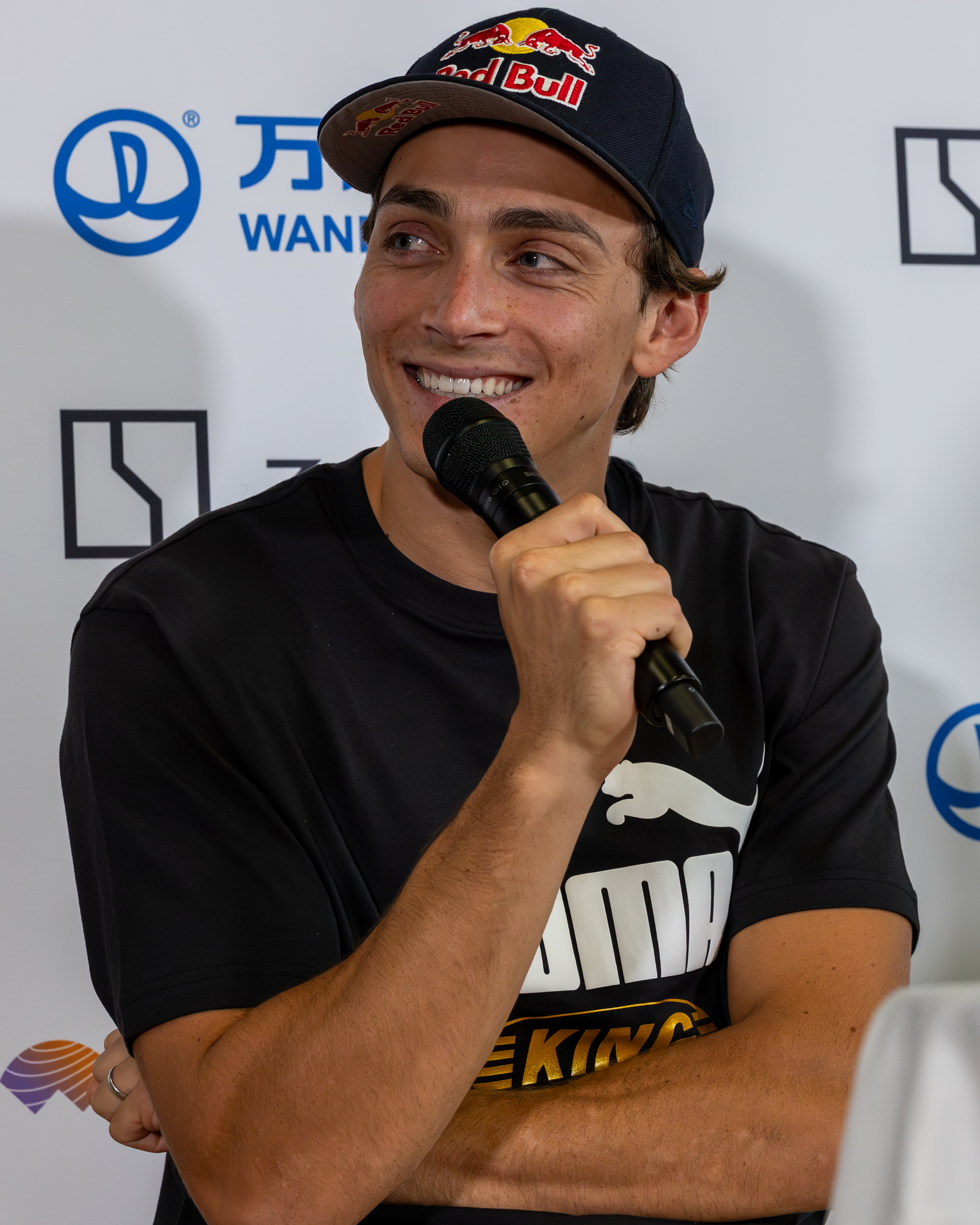
- Duplantis at the 2026 Wanda Diamond League’s Weltklasse Zürich press conference.

Personal information
- Full name: Armand Gustav Duplantis
- Nickname: Mondo
- Nationality: Swedish; American
- Born: 10 November 1999 (age 27) Lafayette, Louisiana, U.S.
- Education: Lafayette High School; Louisiana State University (2018–2019)
- Height: 1.81 m (5 ft 11 in)
- Spouse: Desiré Inglander

Sport
- Country: Sweden
- Sport: Athletics
- Event: Pole vault
- College team: Louisiana State University
- Club: Upsala IF
- Coached by: Greg and Helena Duplantis

Achievements and titles
- Highest world ranking: 1st (pole vault, 2020); 1st (overall, 2020)
- Personal bests: Pole vault: 6.31 m WR (Uppsala 2026); 100 m: 10.37 s (Zurich 2024)
Medal record
Men's athletics
Representing Sweden
Event	1st	2nd	3rd
Olympic Games	2	0	0
World Championships	3	1	0
World Ultimate Championships	1	0	0
World Indoor Championships	4	0	0
Diamond League	5	0	0
World Indoor Tour	2	0	1
European Championships	4	0	0
European Indoor Championships	1	0	0
World Junior Championships	1	0	1
European Junior Championships	1	0	0
Total	24	1	2
Olympic Games
Gold medal – first place	2020 Tokyo	Pole vault
Gold medal – first place	2024 Paris	Pole vault
World Championships
Gold medal – first place	2022 Eugene	Pole vault
Gold medal – first place	2023 Budapest	Pole vault
Gold medal – first place	2025 Tokyo	Pole vault
Silver medal – second place	2019 Doha	Pole vault
World Ultimate Championships
First place	2026 Budapest	Pole vault
World Indoor Championships
Gold medal – first place	2022 Belgrade	Pole vault
Gold medal – first place	2024 Glasgow	Pole vault
Gold medal – first place	2025 Nanjing	Pole vault
Gold medal – first place	2026 Toruń	Pole vault
Diamond League Final
First place	2021 Zürich	Pole vault
First place	2022 Zürich	Pole vault
First place	2023 Eugene	Pole vault
First place	2024 Brussels	Pole vault
First place	2025 Zürich	Pole vault
World Athletics Indoor Tour
First place	2020	Pole vault
First place	2022	Pole vault
Third place	2024	Pole vault
European Championships
Gold medal – first place	2018 Berlin	Pole vault
Gold medal – first place	2022 Munich	Pole vault
Gold medal – first place	2024 Rome	Pole vault
Gold medal – first place	2026 Birmingham	Pole vault
European Indoor Championships
Gold medal – first place	2021 Toruń	Pole vault
World Junior Championships
Gold medal – first place	2018 Tampere	Pole vault
Bronze medal – third place	2016 Bydgoszcz	Pole vault
European Junior Championships
Gold medal – first place	2017 Grosseto	Pole vault
World Youth Championships
Gold medal – first place	2015 Cali	Pole vault

Armand Gustav Duplantis (Swedish pronunciation: [ˈɑ̌rman(d) ˈɡɵ̂sːtav dɵˈplânːtɪs]; born 10 November 1999), nicknamed "Mondo", is a Swedish and American pole vaulter who competes for Sweden. Duplantis holds the pole vaulting world record (6.31 m; 20 ft 8 in) and is the winner of ten senior global titles. He is a two-time Olympic (2020 and 2024) champion, a three-time World outdoor (2022, 2023 and 2025) champion, a four-time World indoor (2022, 2024, 2025 and 2026) champion and the inaugural 2026 World Ultimate champion.

Born and raised in Lafayette, Louisiana, Duplantis won titles as a 15-year-old at the 2015 World Youth Championships. A year later, he placed third at the World U20 Championships. In 2017, he took the European U20 title, and the following year, World U20 title. Duplantis is one of the very few athletes in history to win World Championships titles at youth, junior, and senior levels.

Duplantis is a four-time European champion from 2018, when he set the current world under-20 record, and from 2022, 2024 and 2026. European and World Athletics Male Rising Star of the Year in 2018, two years later he was voted World Male Athlete of the Year. He was the 2021 European Indoor Championships gold medalist and at the 2020 Summer Olympics in Tokyo, Duplantis won his first Olympic gold medal. For his 2022 season, which saw him break world records three times, becoming World outdoor and indoor champion, European and Diamond League champion, and clearing six metres or higher 22 times, Duplantis was crowned both European and World Male Athlete of the Year. He continued to shatter his own world record multiple times a year in 2023 (two times), 2024 (three times) and 2025 (four times), including one (6.25 m) at the 2024 Summer Olympics. He became a four-time World Athlete of the Year (2020, 2022, 2023 and 2025) and the Laureus World Sportsman of the Year in 2025. Duplantis is a five-time Diamond League Champion, having qualified for and won the pole vault Diamond League Final event in five consecutive years, from 2021 to 2025.

Duplantis has cleared six metres or higher in competition more times than any athlete in history, including setting 15 world records. After Renaud Lavillenie cleared 6.16 m (20 ft 2½ in) in 2014, Duplantis has single-handedly raised the bar from 6.17 m in 2020 to his current world record of 6.31 m in 2026. As of September 2026, he has cleared six metres or higher for a continuous span of 9 seasons in a total of 91 competitions dating back to 2018 when he cleared 6.05 m at the 2018 European Athletics Championships in Berlin.

Duplantis is one of only four men to vault 6.10 m (20 ft 0 in) and above, the others being Emmanouil Karalis, Lavillenie and Sergey Bubka. As of September 2026, he accounts for 42 of the 56 competitions where the winning athlete has cleared at least that height: 30 times at outdoor venues and 12 times at indoor venues. Duplantis is widely regarded as the greatest pole vaulter of all time.

== Early life ==
Armand Gustav Duplantis was born on 10 November 1999 into an athletic family in Lafayette, Louisiana, United States. His American father, Greg Duplantis, is a former pole vaulter with a personal best of 5.80 m (19 ft 1/2 in), while his Swedish mother, Helena (née Hedlund), is a former heptathlete and volleyball player. He is of Cajun ancestry through his father. Duplantis grew up primarily speaking English, but also learned Swedish as a second language. He spent summers with his Swedish grandparents.

His two older brothers, Andreas and Antoine, and his younger sister, Johanna, also took up sports; Andreas represented Sweden as a pole vaulter at the 2009 World Youth Championships and 2012 World Junior Championships, while Antoine dropped pole vault for baseball in high school before heading to Louisiana State University where he became the team's career hits leader in 2019. Johanna competes professionally in pole vaulting, also representing Sweden.

Duplantis graduated from Lafayette High School in 2018 and, like his parents and brothers before him, attended Louisiana State University, though he left in 2019 after his first year in order to turn professional.

== Early career ==
External videos
- via YouTube
- 2006–2016 world record progression

Duplantis first tried pole vaulting as a four-year-old at the family's home in Lafayette, Louisiana, and took to the event rapidly. He set his first age group world best at age seven, and his jump of 3.86 m (12 ft 8 in) as a 10-year-old surpassed the previous world bests for ages 11 and 12 as well. As of July 2015, he holds the world best in all age groups from age seven to age 12; he held the age 13 record until it was broken in May 2015.

Duplantis's nickname "Mondo" was given to him at a very young age by his father's best friend who is an Italian from Sicily. "Mondo" means "world" in Italian. At first, he was called "Mondo Man" when he was just a kid before it was shortened to "Mondo". His nickname stuck with him since then perhaps as a foreshadowing of his world domination and record-breaking performances in his sport later in his professional career.

=== 2015–2016: U18 world champion and competing for Sweden ===
During his freshman year at Lafayette High School in 2015, Duplantis set national freshman records both indoors and outdoors and was named Gatorade Louisiana Boys Track & Field Athlete of the Year.

In June 2015, Duplantis announced that he would compete for Sweden. As a citizen of both the United States and Sweden, he could have chosen to vault for either country internationally. According to Jonas Anshelm, the Sweden national team pole vault coach who recruited him, Duplantis had originally planned to compete for the United States, but chose Sweden in part because Anshelm had invited Duplantis's father to join the team as a coach. Duplantis has also said that his older brother's great experiences representing Sweden at a youth level, as well as his own love for Sweden as a child made the decision to compete for Sweden very easy, but that he nonetheless still feels a strong bond to Lafayette.

Duplantis represented Sweden for the first time at the 2015 World Youth Championships in Cali, Colombia; where he won gold on countback with a first-attempt clearance of 5.30 m (17 ft 4 1/2 in), improving his personal best by two centimeters and setting a new championship record jointly with Ukrainian Vladyslav Malykhin. While competing in Sweden, Duplantis, had first represented a club of his grandparents' town Avesta, IK Stål, and switched to his mother's former club, Upsala IF, in 2016.

On 6 February 2016, Duplantis cleared 5.49 m (18 ft 0 in) at a high school meet in Baton Rouge, setting a new age-16 world best, world indoor youth best and national high school indoor record; he was the first high school athlete to vault 18 feet indoors. Emmanouil Karalis of Greece, the same age as Duplantis, broke his world marks with a 5.53 m (18 ft 1 1/2 in) vault only one week later.

=== 2017: U20 world record and U20 European title ===
On 11 February 2017, at the Millrose Games, Duplantis cleared 5.75 m (18 ft 10 1/2 in) to set the world indoor junior record. That mark was ratified by IAAF.

A month later, on 11 Mar, Duplantis improved his indoor personal record to 5.82 m (19 ft 1 in) in the same facility at the New Balance Nationals in New York City. His 5.82 m mark was however not ratified as a world indoor junior record by IAAF because an on-site anti-doping test did not occur in New York, leaving the official World U20 indoor record going into 2018 still at 5.75 m.

On 1 April, Duplantis cleared 5.90 m at the Clyde Littlefield Texas Relays, improving his personal record, setting a new World U20 Record and beating the previous record of 5.80 m set by Maksim Tarasov in 1989 and equalled by Raphael Holzdeppe in 2008 by an astonishing 10 cm. The vault also became a Swedish senior record beating previous mark of 5.87 m set by Oscar Janson in 2003 by 3 cm (1 in). While the IAAF recognized the record with Duplantis representing Sweden, on 2 December 2017, USATF also ratified Duplantis's mark as the American junior record.

On 23 July, at the 2017 European Athletics U20 Championships In Grosseto, Italy, Duplantis set a pole vault championship record of 5.65 m to win gold. Duplantis won the competition on just his second jump of the competition by clearing 5.55 m on his first attempt. He then set the bar to 5.65 m and on his third attempt, he soared over the bar to break a Maksim Tarasov's long standing championship record of 5.60 m set in 1989.

=== 2018: U20 World champion, first major senior title and first jump over 6.00 m ===
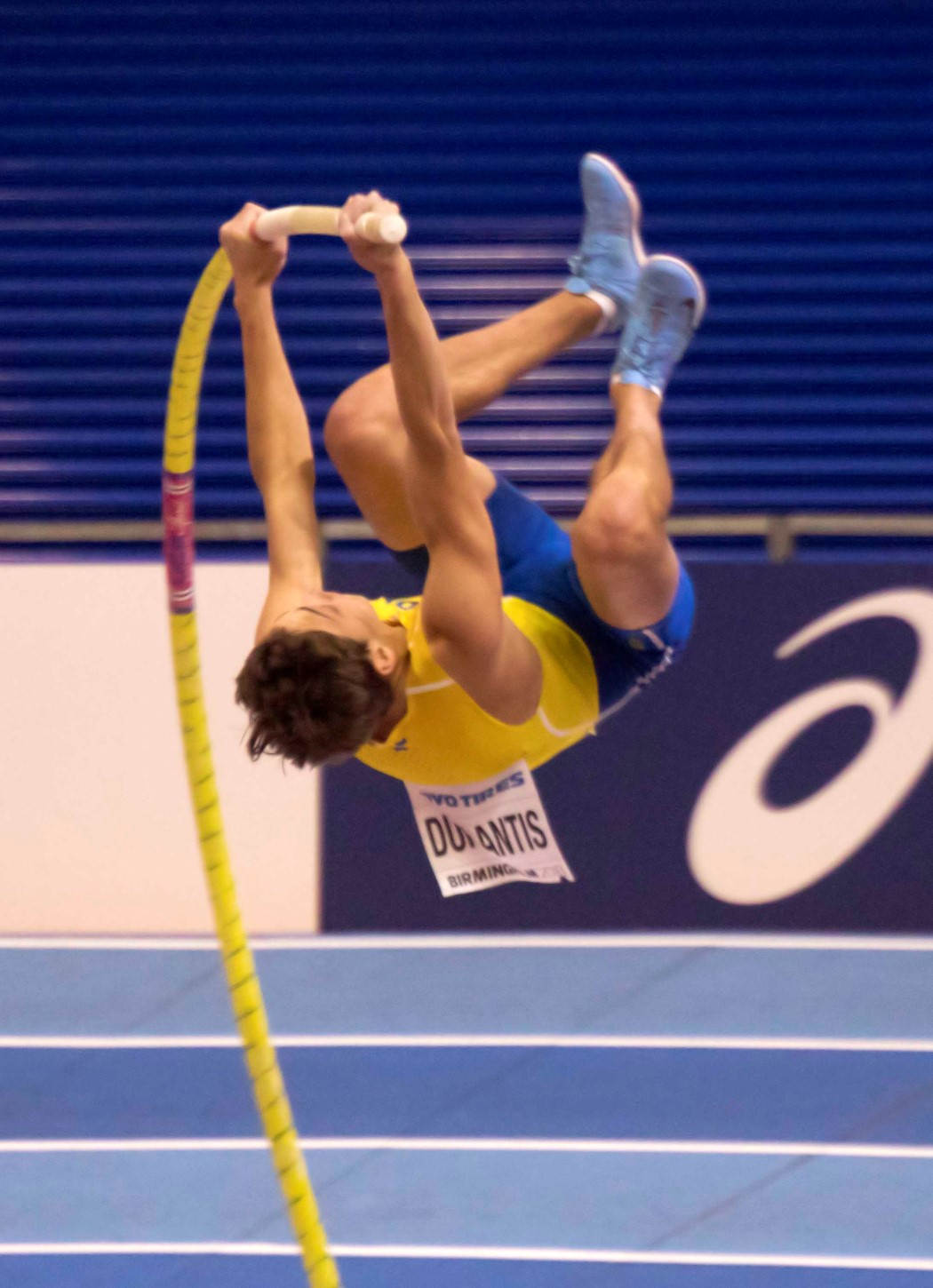
Duplantis pole-vaulting at the 2018 World Indoor Championships in Birmingham, United Kingdom

On 12 January, Duplantis began his 2018 season with an indoor personal record by clearing 5.83 m (19 ft 1 1/2 in) at the Pole Vault Summit in Reno, Nevada. The 5.83 m jump could have been ratified as a world indoor junior record if not for violation of some overlooked IAAF rules. In 2003, the IAAF changed the standard length of the pegs that the pole-vaulting crossbar rests on from 75 mm to 55 mm. Performances in the elite men's competition at the summit were invalidated two days later when it was discovered that 75 mm crossbar pegs were used on the pit for the men's elite competition instead of 55 mm mandated by IAAF. The elite women on a separate pit pole vaulted with the correct 55 mm pegs. In addition, IAAF was unable to ratify the 5.83 m record because on-site doping control was absent in a similar reason IAAF did not ratify his best indoor mark of 5.82 m last year at the New Balance Nationals Indoor event. IAAF rule requires an immediate test on site. Although Duplantis submitted to a drug test administered by a USADA official, it was only done the next morning and not at the Reno-Sparks Livestock Events Center where the meet was held.

On 25 February, at the All Star Perche pole vault meeting in the central French city of Clermont-Ferrand, Duplantis vaulted 5.88 m (19 ft 3 1/2 in) vault to better the pending world U20 indoor record of 5.78 m set by Emmanouil Karalis of Greece on 11 February. The 18-year-old first topped 5.81 m on his first attempt before improving the record to 5.88 m on his third try.

On 27 March, Duplantis was granted a one-time waiver of bylaw 6.1.3 in the LHSAA handbook by the state association to compete in the elite men's pole vault section of the Texas Relays on 31 Mar without penalising his eligibility to compete for his high school. Before the waiver decision was announced, LHSAA faced criticism for choosing to elect rather than modernize a rule which was more to protect younger high school athletes from injury when competing with or against bigger elite athletes in contact sports. Bylaw 6.1.3 prohibits an athlete of a high school team from competing with an elite team or against an elite competition. A year ago, Duplantis competed at the Texas Relays elite pole vault event wearing Lafayette High School colors only to find out later about a possible violation of the LHSAA rule. He won that event with a world U20 record of 5.90 m.

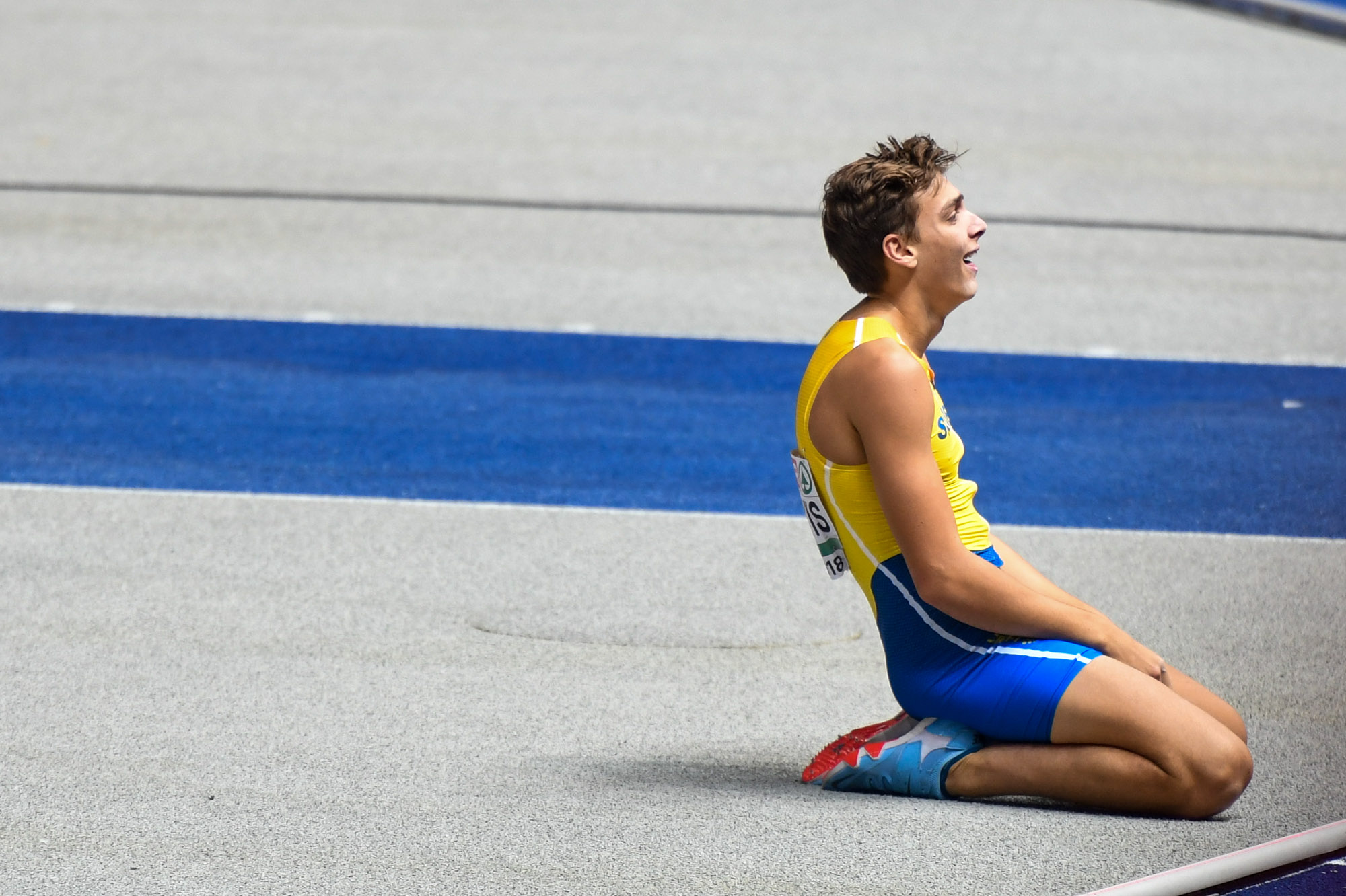
18-year-old Duplantis won his first major senior title at the 2018 European Championships in Berlin, Germany.

At the 2018 World U20 Championship held from 10 to 15 July in Tampere, Finland, Duplantis won gold and broke the championship record with a vault of 5.82 m (19 ft 1^{1}/_{8} in).

On 12 August, Duplantis set a world U20 record of 6.05 m (19 ft 10 in) at the 2018 European Athletics Championships in Berlin, Germany to take gold in his first major senior championship title. In doing so, he raised his personal best by a massive 12 cm and it made him the youngest ever, at 18 years and 275 days, to win a men's field event in the 84-year history of the championship and also the youngest ever to join the exclusive 6.00 m club. Even Sergey Bubka, the greatest pole vaulter of all then, did not clear 6.00 m until he was 21. His 6.05 m vault ranked him tied as the fourth-best pole vaulter in history, indoors or out, and tied for the second-best outdoors.

=== 2019: Collegiate season at LSU, turning pro ===
Duplantis enrolled at Louisiana State University in 2018. During his freshman year at LSU in 2019, Duplantis competed 10 times in the pole vault event. He set both the indoor and outdoor collegiate records, won indoor and outdoor SEC Championships titles, and won the NCAA Division I indoor title. The only defeat of his collegiate career came at the NCAA Division I outdoor championships when he took second place to Chris Nilsen.

On 22 February 2019, day 1 of the SEC Indoor Championships at the Randal Tyson Track Center in Fayetteville, Arkansas, Duplantis set a new collegiate indoor record of 5.92 m to claim gold in the event. The previous record was 5.91 m set by Shawn Barber of University of Akron on 13 March 2015. In addition to the indoor collegiate record, it is an SEC championship meet record, world lead for 2019, Swedish record, and an indoor personal best. On 21 February 2020, Duplantis's indoor collegiate record was surpassed by Chris Nilsen when he jumped 5.93 m.

On 11 May 2019, Duplantis cleared 6.00 m at the SEC Outdoor Championships in Fayetteville, Arkansas, to set a new outdoor collegiate record. In the process, Duplantis helped LSU Tigers win its first SEC Outdoor Track and Field Championship since 1990 edging Florida Gators 105–95.

In June 2019, Duplantis announced that he was turning professional, thereby forgoing his remaining NCAA eligibility. Duplantis could have turned professional in 2018, but one year of university at LSU was agreed between the LSU coaches and his parents.

== Professional career ==
=== 2019–2020: World championship silver medalist, first and second world records ===
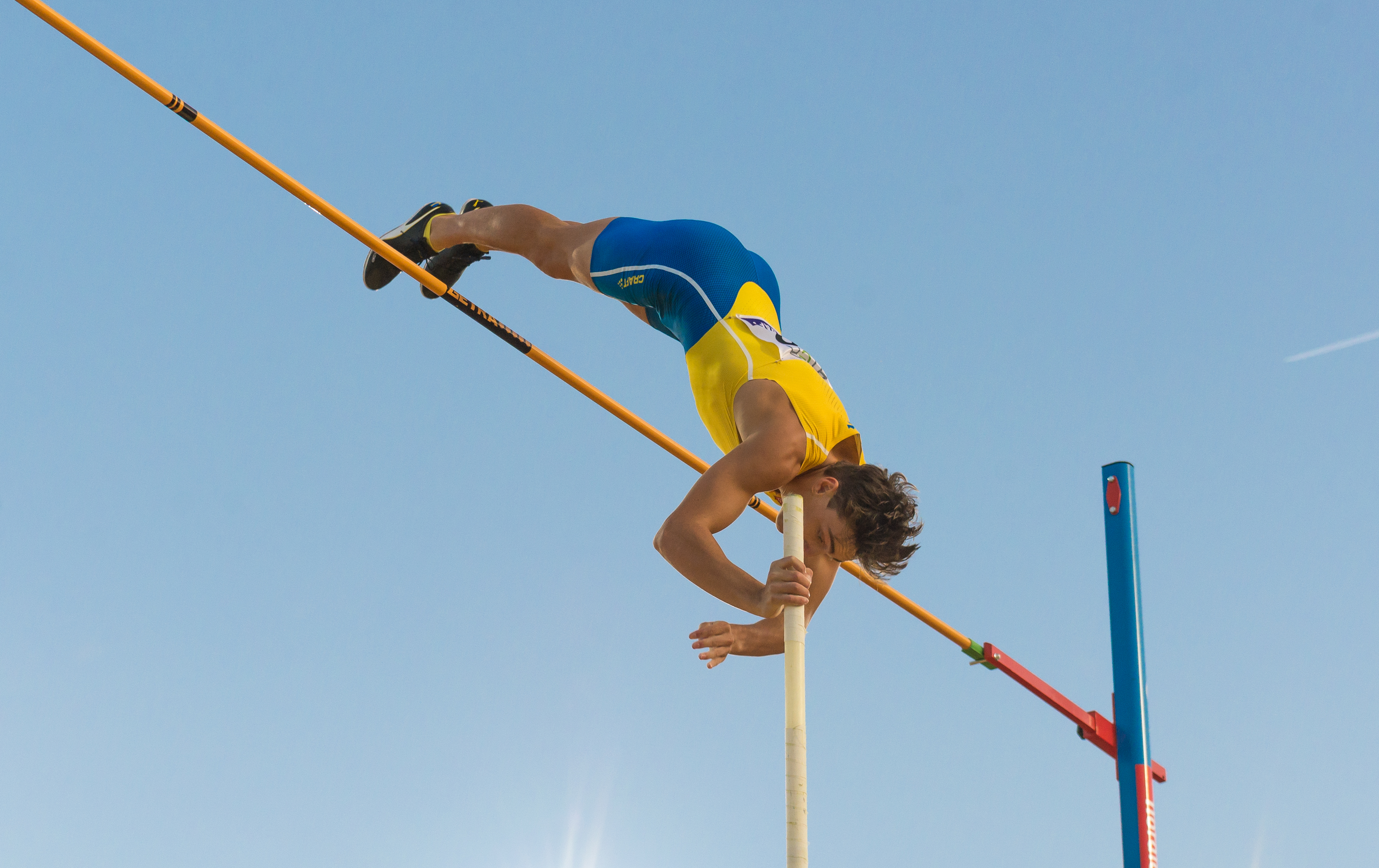
Duplantis jumps 6.00 m at 2019 Finland-Sweden International in Stockholm, Sweden.

On 24 August 2019, Duplantis cleared 6.00 m (19 ft 8 in) to equal his season's best to take gold in the Finnkampen (an annual international athletics competition between Sweden and Finland) held in Stockholm, Sweden as hosts Sweden beat Finland in both the men's and women's competition. Duplantis's 6.00 m vault broke the competition record of 5.85 m held by Patrik Kristiansson since 2002. His teammate Melker Svärd Jacobsson came in second with a clearance of 5.36 m.

On 1 October, Duplantis placed second at the 2019 IAAF World Championships in Doha, Qatar, clearing 5.97 m (19 ft 7 in) on his third attempt.

On 4 February 2020, Duplantis cleared 6.00 m (19 ft 8 in) indoors at his first competition of the season in Düsseldorf, Germany. He followed that up with three attempts at a new world record of 6.17 m (20 ft 3 in). On his second attempt, he cleared the bar but brushed it off with his arm on the way back down.

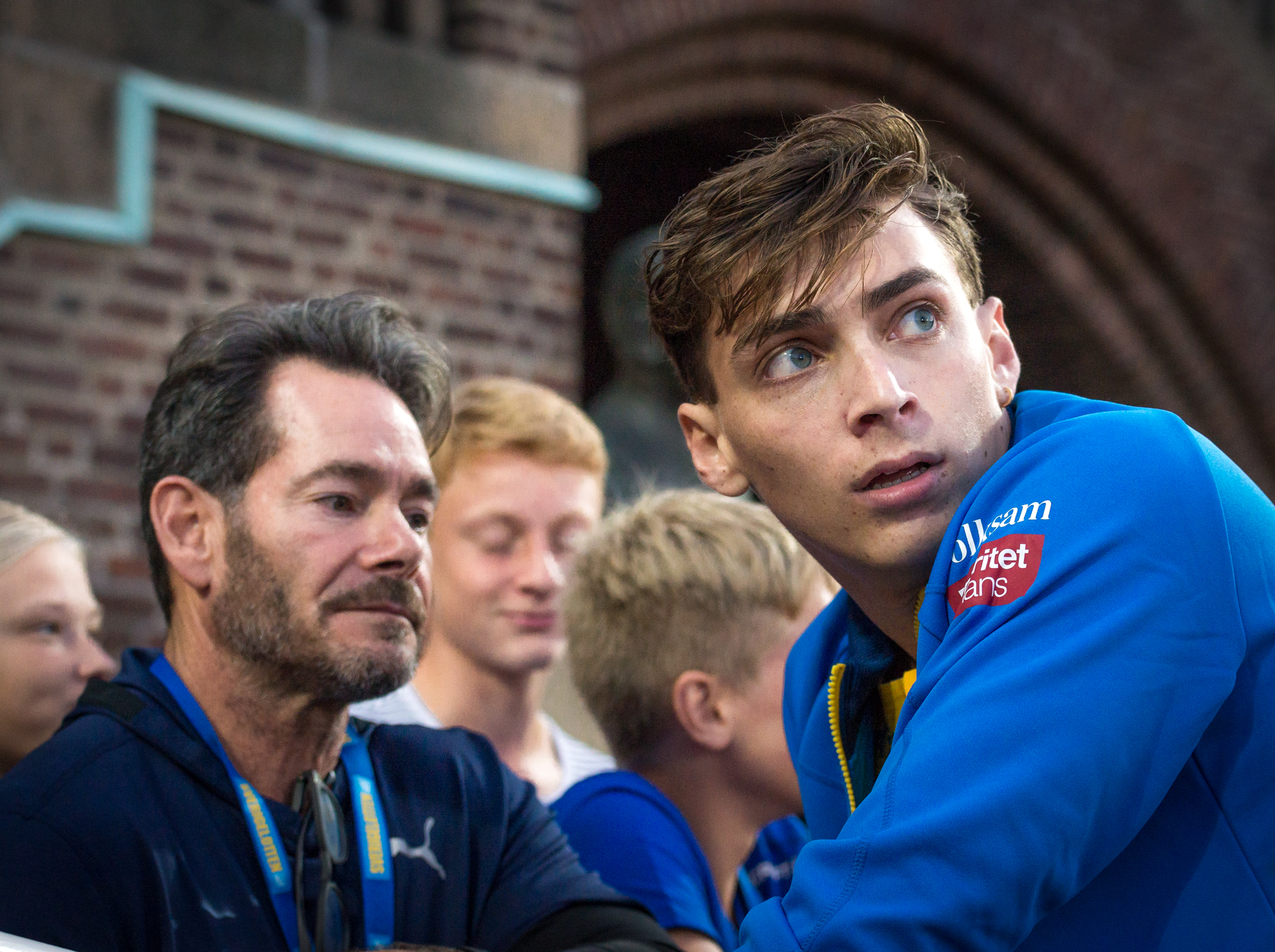
Father and coach Greg Duplantis (left) with Armand Duplantis in 2019

On 8 February, Duplantis broke Renaud Lavillenie's almost-six-year-old world record with a jump of 6.17 m (20 ft 3 in) at a World Athletics Indoor Tour Meeting in Toruń, Poland. A week later, on 15 February at the Müller Indoor Grand Prix in Glasgow, he increased the record by another centimeter to 6.18 m (20 ft 3 1/2 in).

On 19 February, Duplantis won the Meeting Hauts de France Pas de Calais in Liévin, France by clearing 6.07 m (19 ft 11 in), after which he made three unsuccessful attempts at the new world record height of 6.19 m (20 ft 3 1/2 in). A few days later, on 23 February, he won the All Star Perche in Clermont-Ferrand, France by clearing 6.01 m (19 ft 8 1/2 in) in his last indoor competition for the season, which ended with new unsuccessful attempts at 6.19 m (20 ft 3 1/2 in). Duplantis ended his 2020 indoor season by becoming the first man in history to put together five consecutive indoor competitions at 6.00 m or higher. This streak was surpassed by himself in 2022 when he won six successive indoor competitions at 6.00 m or higher.

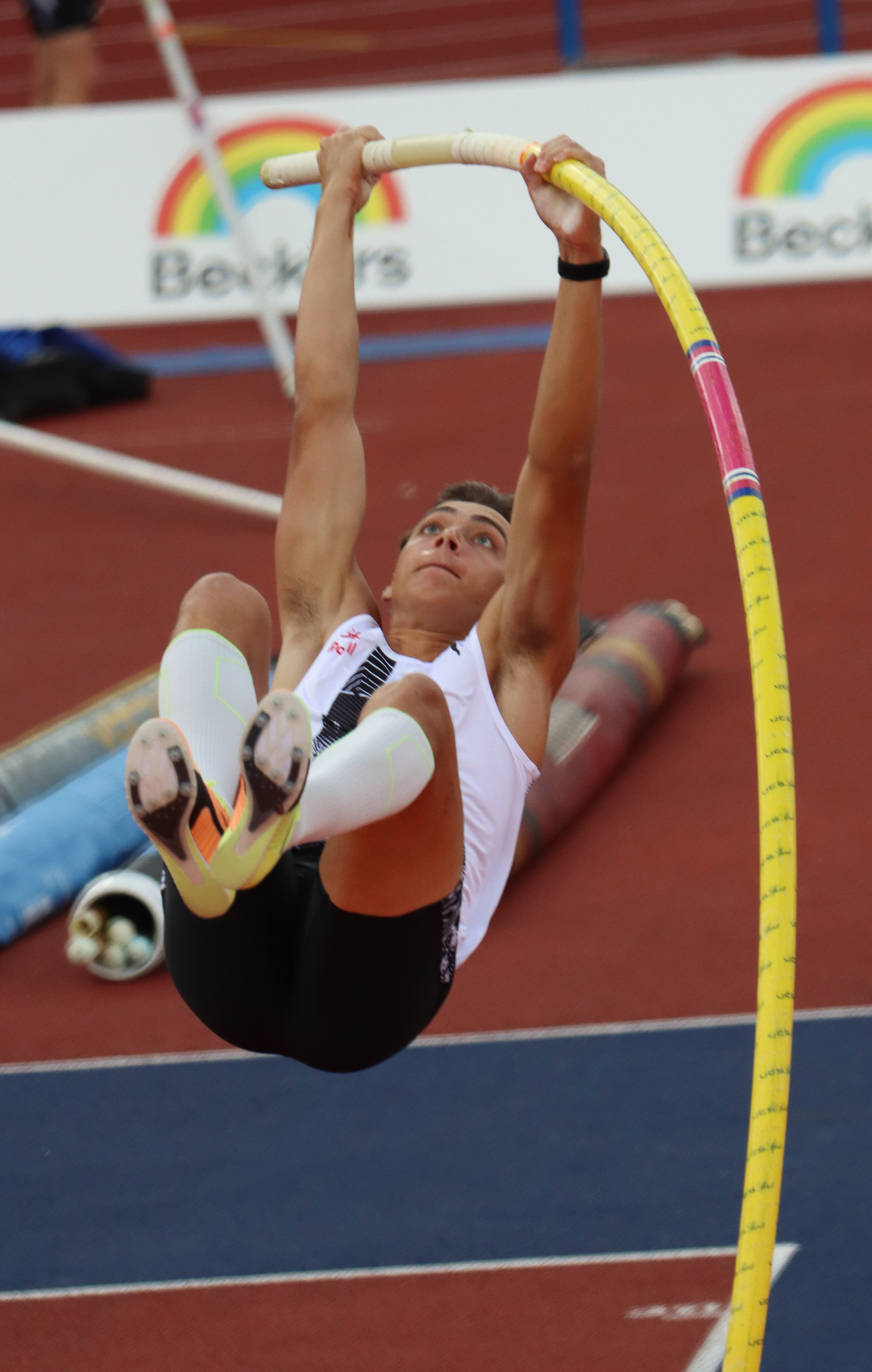
Duplantis at the 2020 BAUHAUS-galan meeting in Stockholm

On 21 February, after the seventh and final Gold level meeting of the 2020 World Athletics Indoor Tour series in Madrid ended, Duplantis emerged as the overall winner of the 2020 World Indoor Tour after securing a total of 36 points from his best three results from the tour (which were in Toruń, Glasgow and Liévin). This is his first World Athletics Indoor Tour title.

On 17 September at the Rome Golden Gala Pietro Mennea Diamond League, Duplantis broke Sergey Bubka's outdoor world best of 6.14 m (20 ft 1 1/2 in), with a second-attempt clearance of 6.15 m (20 ft 2 in). Since 1998, World Athletics does not recognize the indoor world record and the outdoor world record as two separate world records in the pole vault event. An official world record can be set in a facility either "with or without (a) roof". A new indoor best mark is accepted as the new world record if it is better than the best outdoor mark; Duplantis already held the world record at 6.18 m (20 ft 3 1/2 in) from his indoor clearance in February 2020.

=== 2021: Olympic title in Tokyo and European indoor title ===
On 6 March, Duplantis competed at the 2021 European Indoor Championships. He was the overwhelming favourite to win the title after the late withdrawal of Renaud Lavillenie with injury. Duplantis was still tested by Piotr Lisek and Lavillenie's younger brother Valentin, who went on to claim bronze and silver respectively — the latter with a personal best. Duplantis however set a new championship record of 6.05 m (19 ft 10 in) before making three unsuccessful attempts at 6.19 m (20 ft 3 1/2 in), his second narrowly missing the world record.

At the one-year delayed 2020 Summer Olympics in Tokyo, Duplantis won a gold medal when he cleared a height of 6.02 m (19 ft 9 in) on his first effort, and afterwards got very close to beating his own world record. Silver medalist Chris Nilsen was full of praise for the winner. He compared the competition against Duplantis that evening as being a regular footballer "trying to emulate Lionel Messi or Cristiano Ronaldo" and that his superiority over the world's best pole vaulters was "impressive and ridiculous".

=== 2022: Three new world records, first world titles and second European title ===
On 17 January, still only 22 and having won the award previously in 2019 and 2021, Duplantis was crowned Sportsman of the Year for the third time at the Swedish Sports Awards ceremony for his achievements in 2021. Duplantis won the European indoor and Olympic gold medals and cleared 6.00 m or higher in 12 of his 17 competitions in 2021.

On 7 March, he beat his own world record by jumping 6.19 m (20 ft 3 1/2 in) at the Belgrade Indoor Meeting. Two weeks later, at the 2022 World Athletics Indoor Championships in Belgrade, he won the gold medal. At the same time, he broke his world record yet again, by jumping 6.20 m (20 ft 4 in).

On 30 June, at the BAUHAUS-galan, Duplantis broke his own outdoor world best of 6.15 m (20 ft 2 in) set in 2020, by jumping 6.16 m (20 ft 2 1/2 in).

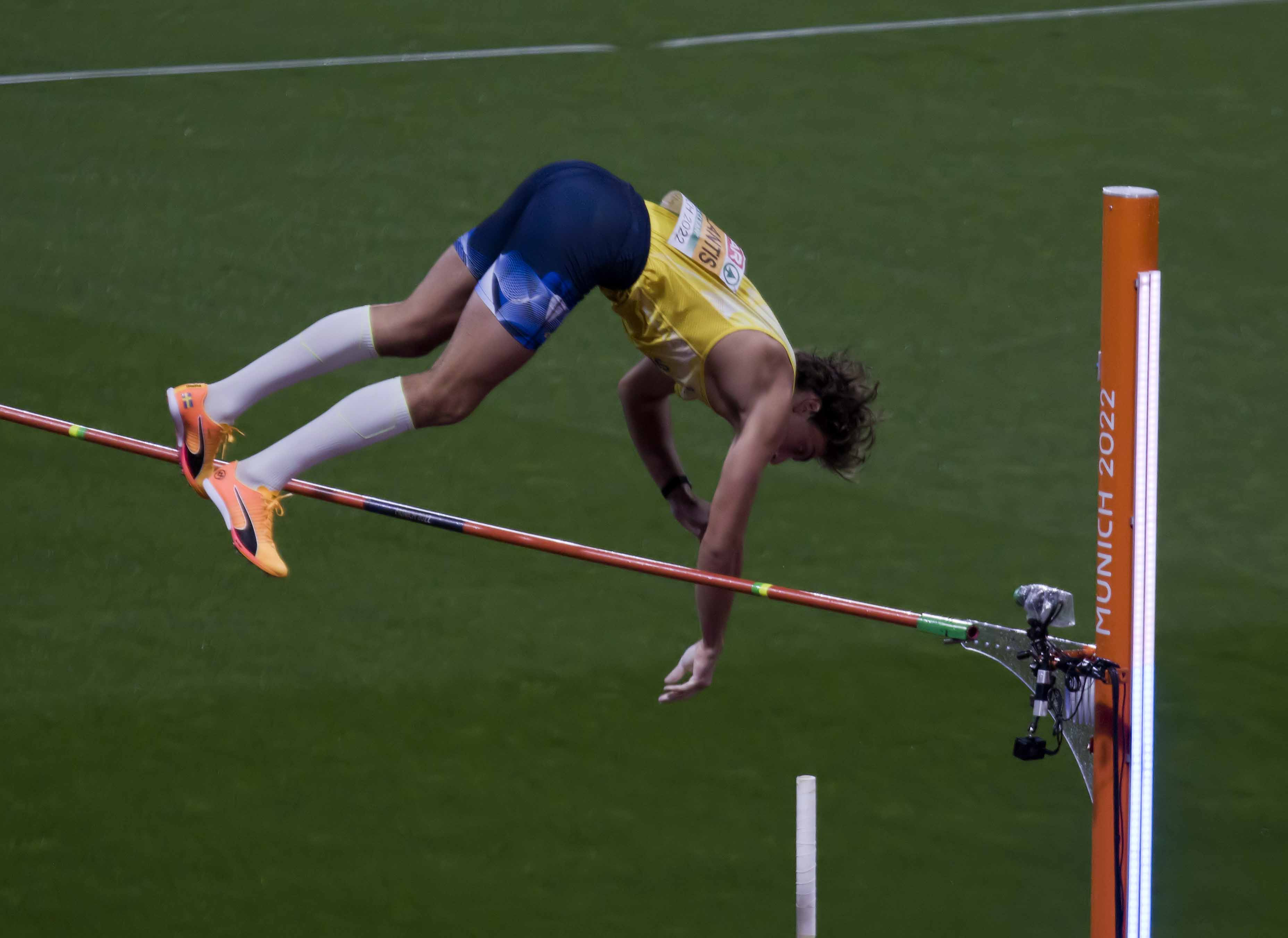
Duplantis pole-vaulting at the 2022 European Championships in Munich

On 24 July, he broke his own world record yet again to win gold, at the 2022 World Athletics Championships in Eugene, Oregon by recording a jump of 6.21 m (20 ft 4 1/2 in). Though this was Duplantis's fifth world record, it was the first time that he had broken a world record outdoors.

At the 2022 European Championships held in Munich, he won gold and broke the championship record with a jump of 6.06 m (19 ft 10 1/2 in).

Duplantis capped his season in September by clearing 6.07 m (19 ft 11 in) at the Zürich Diamond League final to retain the Diamond Trophy.

On the back of three world records, two global titles, a Diamond League trophy, winning 18 of his 19 competitions and 23 six meters or higher jumps in one season, Duplantis was named 2022 World Athlete of the Year by World Athletics on 6 December.

=== 2023: Second world title and two more world records (sixth and seventh) ===
Duplantis got his 2023 campaign off to strong start at the Mondo Classic in Uppsala, the meet named after his nickname. His winning height of 6.10 m (20 ft 0 in) represented not only his best ever season opener but also the highest season-opening performance of any pole vaulter in history. He also broke Bubka's record of 11 vaults of 6.10 m or higher (including indoors and outdoors).

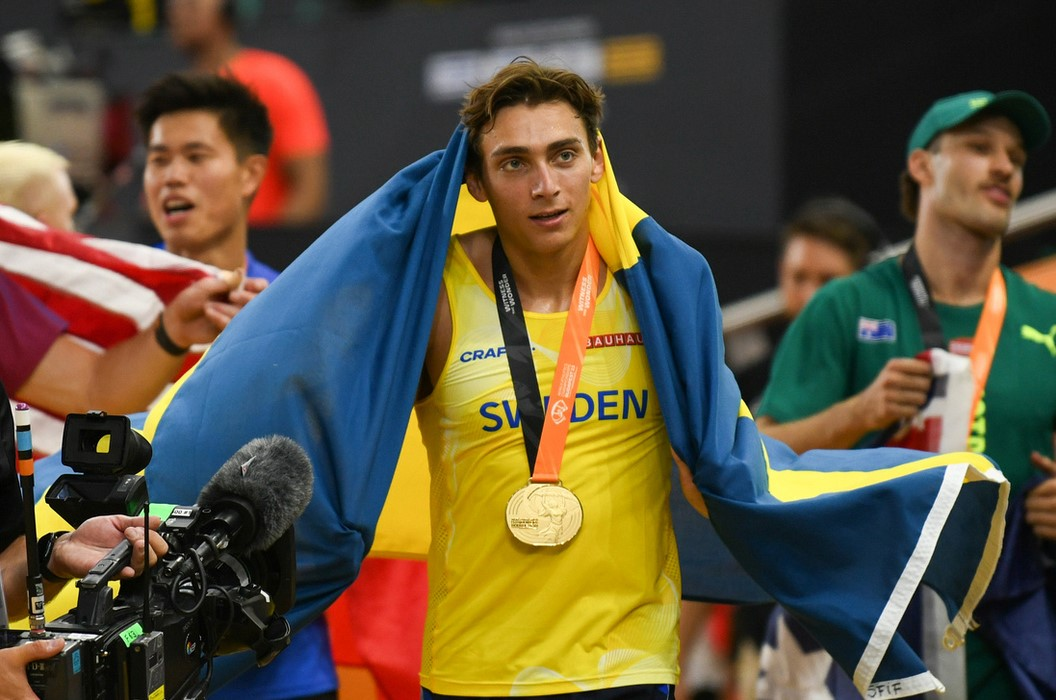
Duplantis with his gold medal at the 2023 World Championships in Budapest, Hungary

On 25 February at the All Star Perche indoor meeting in Clermont-Ferrand, France, Duplantis broke the world record again, clearing 6.22 m (20 ft 5 in) to increase the number of his career six-metre-plus jumps to 60. On 26 August 2023, Duplantis defended his world title at the 2023 World Athletics Championships in Budapest, Hungary with a winning jump of 6.10 m (20 ft 0 in).

On 17 September, he broke his own world record when he cleared 6.23 m (20 ft 5 1/4 in) at the Prefontaine Classic in Eugene, Oregon.

On 11 December, Duplantis emerged as the first recipient of the World Athlete of the Year (Men's field) award from World Athletics. Although this is Duplantis's third senior award from World Athletics having previously won the World Athlete of the Year award in 2020 and 2022, the 2023 award "World Athlete of the Year (Men's field)" is considered an inaugural award because World Athletics Awards changed from crowning a sole male and female winner to issuing three separate awards for men and three separate ones for women across three event categories: track, field, and out of stadia.

=== 2024: Second world indoor title, third European title, second Olympic title in Paris and three more world records (eighth to tenth) ===
At the 2024 World Athletics Indoor Championships in Glasgow, in March, Duplantis made a vault of 6.05 m, winning the gold medal.

On 26 February, for a second year in a row and a third time in his career, Duplantis was nominated, along with Lionel Messi, Novak Djokovic, Erling Haaland, Noah Lyles, and Max Verstappen, for the prestigious Laureus World Sportsman of the Year award for 2024 (Djokovic won).

On 20 April, at the Xiamen Diamond League meeting in Xiamen, China, the first stage of the 2024 Diamond League, Duplantis improved his world record by one centimeter, clearing 6.24 m on his first attempt.

On 12 June, he won the 2024 European Championships in Rome, being the only competitor to clear the six-meter mark. Assured of the title, he set a new European Championships record of 6.10 meters on his first attempt before failing in his three attempts to break the world record. With his 6.10 m clearance, Duplantis achieved his 60th six metres plus competition so far. The next best in history is Sergey Bubka at 44.

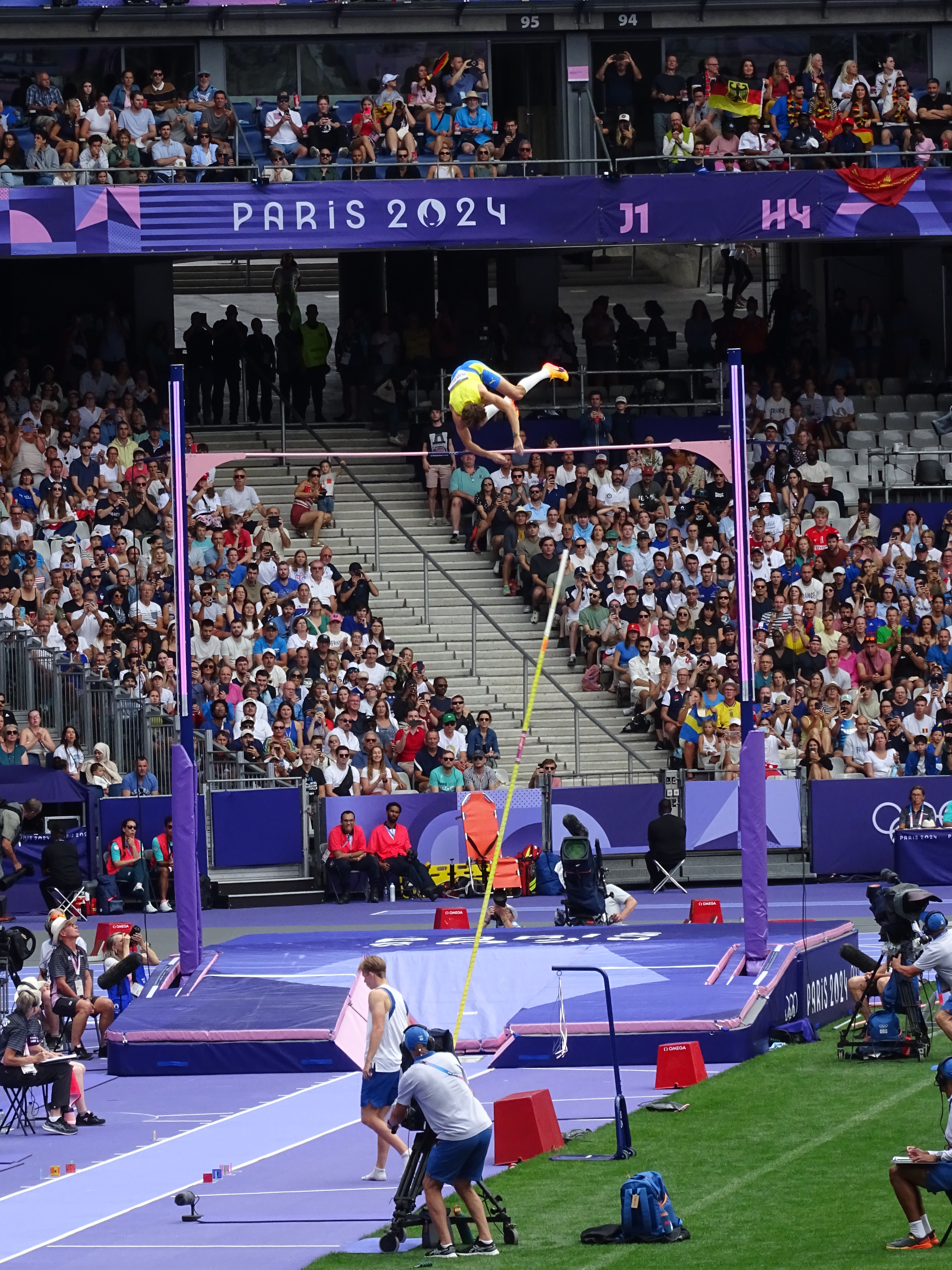
Armand Duplantis, pole vaulting qualification, 3 August 2024, Paris 2024 Olympics

On 5 August, at the Paris Olympics, Duplantis retained his Olympic title from 2020. He won with a jump of 6.00 m, after Sam Kendricks failed to clear higher than 5.95 m. He then jumped 6.10 m to break the Olympic record set by Thiago Braz at the 2016 Olympics and finally jumped 6.25 m, on his third attempt at that height, setting a new world record. In a repeat of the 2024 European Championships, Duplantis was the only competitor to clear 6.00 m when he cleared both 6.00 m and 6.10 m on his first try and again attempted to break his own world record of 6.24 m. He both created a world record and broke his own Olympic record, set 20 minutes earlier.

With his title at the Paris Olympics, the 24-year-old Duplantis became the first back-to-back Olympic champion in men's pole vault since American Bob Richards, who won in the 1952 Helsinki Games and the 1956 Melbourne Games. Duplantis and Richards are the only men's pole vaulters with two Olympic golds in the event.

Duplantis's ability to perform under pressure and to continually improve and break world records have solidified his status as a once-in-a-generation talent in athletics. His accomplishments representing Sweden at major global and continental championships are unparalleled. As of August 2024, he has set a total of 9 championships records and an Olympic record collectively at youth, junior and senior level competitions including rewriting the world record on three occasions when he won global titles: a 6.20 m clearance at the 2022 World Athletics Indoor Championships in Belgrade, a 6.21 m clearance at the 2022 World Athletics Championships in Oregon and his latest 6.25 m clearance at the 2024 Paris Olympics.

His dominance in the event has drawn comparison to legends in other sports. The New York Times reported that Duplantis is to pole vaulting what Usain Bolt was to sprinting; Michael Phelps to swimming; Simone Biles to gymnastics. Duplantis's supremacy in the pole vault is so overwhelming that he often wins meets by almost 1 foot (30 cm), in a sport where medals are often won by margins of a centimeter. He has won all of his competition events since the 2023 Herculis, a Diamond League event in Monaco. By winning a second straight Olympic gold medal and breaking the record for the ninth time — each time by one centimeter — Duplantis has been called the greatest pole vaulter of all time. Prior to the Paris Olympics, retired Ukrainian pole vaulter Sergey Bubka had been considered the sport's all-time greatest.

On 25 August, at the Kamila Skolimowska Memorial in Chorzów, Poland, the twelfth stop on the 2024 Diamond League, Duplantis improved his world record for the tenth time in his career and the third time in 2024 by one centimeter, increasing the world record to 6.26 m. The men's pole vault event at the Silesian Stadium saw two other jumpers (Sam Kendricks of the US and Greece's Emmanouil Karalis) cleared six metres besides Duplantis making it the first time in history that three pole vaulters broke the 6.00 m barrier in a single competition.

At the Silesia Diamond League's pre-competition press conference, meet organisers announced a historic award for the most valuable athlete of the meet, as judged by World Athletics points system. Jakob Ingebrigtsen broke the longest-standing men's athletics world record in an individual event, clocking 7:17.55 min for the 3000 m, taking more than three seconds off the mark of 7:20.67 min set by Kenya's Daniel Komen in 1996. He was expected to win the inaugural MVP award. However, after converting all results into World Athletics points, Ingebrigtsen running 7:17 min for 3000 m was not enough to win. Mondo's 6.26 m pole vault world record was worth 1339 points to 1320 for Ingebrigtsen's 3000 m world record time of 7:17.55 min. Duplantis turned out to be the first MVP of the meeting and took home a sparkling 14-carat gold diamond-encrusted 'Champion Ring' worth $10,000, along with a cheque for the same amount. This was on top of the $50,000 bonus he received for breaking the world record.

On 4 September, the day before the Zürich Diamond League, Duplantis competed in an exhibition 100 m event against 400 m hurdles world record holder Karsten Warholm. Duplantis won in a new personal best of 10.37 seconds, while Warholm finished second in 10.47 seconds, also a personal best.

On 13 September, Duplantis rounded off his 2024 campaign with a fourth consecutive Diamond League trophy at the 2024 final in Brussels, winning the competition with a meet record of 6.11 m.

On 26 Oct, Duplantis was crowned men's European Athlete of the Year for the first time outright having previously shared the award with Jakob Ingebrigtsen in 2022.

On 6 November, Duplantis joined a network of sports stars such as Brazilian footballer Neymar Jr and Norwegian hurdler Karsten Warholm to become global ambassabor for the Wings for Life World Run charity event to be held on 4 May 2025 to raise funds for spinal cord injury research.

=== 2025: Multiple new world records, 3rd outdoor and indoor world titles, century mark, Laureus award, 5th diamond league title and 6.30 m ===
On 28 February, Duplantis broke his own world record for the 11th time at the All Star Perche in Clermont-Ferrand, France. After securing victory at the competition with a 6.07 m clearance, Duplantis raised the bar to 6.27 m and cleared it in his first attempt. His debut song "Bop", released just in time for the pole vault meeting, was being played at the arena when he made the world record jump.

In a conversation with Puma's CEO Arne Freundt, released on 18 March as a part of the sports company's annual report, Duplantis indicated he believed he can push the pole vault world record to 6.40 m in the next few years while 6.30 m is his target in the near future.

On 22 March, Duplantis won the World Athletics Indoor Championships in Nanjing with a winning height of 6.15 m to register a hat-trick of world indoor titles. Duplantis was pushed all the way by Greece's Emmanouil Karalis, who cleared a height of 6.05 m. In another era, Karalis would have comfortably been crowned a world champion indoors. However, at Nanjing, he became the only man in a championship final to clear a height of 6.05 m and not win gold.

Going into the defence of his world indoor title at Nanjing, Duplantis had a total of 98 clearances over six meters. With four clearances of six meters or higher at Nanjing, Duplantis surpassed the century mark to register an aggregate total of 102 jumps over six meters. In comparison, the next best was former world record holder Sergey Bubka with a career total of 46 clearances of six metres or more.

On 21 April, Duplantis won the 2025 Laureus World Sportsman of the Year to become only the second track-and-field athlete to win the award, after Usain Bolt, and the only field athlete to do so. The award came after a third consecutive nomination and fourth nomination overall, having been previously nominated for the award in 2021, 2023 and 2024.

On 15 June, Duplantis set a further world record, his 12th overall and his fourth in a Diamond League meeting, with a first time clearance of 6.28 m at the home Diamond League meeting held in Stockholm Olympic Stadium. He previously broke the world record twice in Poland, twice in Belgrade, Serbia, twice in Eugene, Oregon, once in Scotland and China, and three times in France, including the 2024 Paris Olympics. This is the first time he has set a world record in his home country, Sweden, fulfilling a missing piece of achievement in his list of accolades.

Duplantis's 12th world record at the historic Stockholm Olympic Stadium, once the venue of the 1912 Summer Olympics, was the first time a world record in pole vault has been set at the stadium. The stadium has seen more athletic world records broken than any other stadium in the world, with a total of 83 set between 1912 and 2008 but none of the 83 previous world records set at the stadium were in pole vault. The last Swedish athlete who broke a world record at the BAUHAUS-galan meet within the stadium ground was Patrik Sjöberg, who set the high jump world record in 1987. Then Duplantis's mother was present in the stadium's stands too.

As a tradition of the Stockholm Olympic Stadium, Duplantis's name was etched onto the walls of the "Stadion Walk of Fame" to commemorate his achievement of breaking world record within its grounds.

With this Diamond League victory on home soil, Duplantis has won 37 out of 41 Diamond League outings since 2020, making him one of the greatest serial winner of the Diamond League circuit. Overall, he has notched up a total of 39 Diamond League meet wins since his Diamond League debut in 2017, surpassing Renand Lavillenie's total of 37 wins. He has competed in 93 events since 2020, losing only 4 times, none of which have come outside of Diamond League meets.

On 11 July, Duplantis won at the Monaco Diamond League in a new meet record of 6.05 m, erasing the previous record of 6.02 m set in 2019 by Poland's Piotr Lisek. With another Diamond League meet record under his belt, Duplantis moved closer to a clean sweep, as he now holds the meet records in 13 out of the 15 different stops of the 2025 edition of the Diamond League series. The remaining two stops are Rabat's meet record of 5.86 m, held by Sam Kendricks, and London's meet record of 6.03 m, held by Renaud Lavillenie.

On 12 August, Duplantis set his 13th world record with a 6.29 m clearance at Gyulai István Memorial – a World Athletics Continental Tour Gold meeting – in Budapest. This was the first world record ever set in the 15-year history of the Gyulai István Memorial. The 6.29 m mark erased the Hungarian all-comers' record of 6.10 m Duplantis set at the same stadium where he won his second world title at the 2023 World Championships. In a light hearted moment, Puma, Duplantis's main sponsor which pays him a bonus for each of his world records, reacted to his 13th world record with a sarcastic comment on Instagram: 'Please give us a rest'.

On 13 August, Duplantis was appointed by World Athletics as the inaugural Ultimate Star to the first edition of World Athletics Ultimate Championship slated to be held in Budapest 11–13 September 2026. The new global event would be an exclusive, biennial season-ending track and field meet for even years when a World Outdoor Championships is not held. World Athletics later named Usain Bolt as its Ultimate Legend Duplantis, along with Bolt, would help promote the inaugural championship in their respective roles.

On 27 August, Duplantis won the Diamond League crown for the fifth time in a row at the 2025 Zürich Diamond League final meeting, inching closer to the seven titles won by French pole vaulter Renaud Lavillenie and American triple-jumper Christian Taylor. Duplantis's winning height of 6.00 m was his 118th clearance at 6 m and above.

On 15 September at the 2025 World Athletics Championships in Tokyo, Duplantis won his third consecutive world title in pole vault. He sealed his title with a 6.15 m clearance in the highest quality men's pole vault final in a global championship ever where seven men cleared 5.90 m or higher in a single competition, then continued to set a new world record of 6.30 m. He soared to his 14th world record of his career on his final attempt. The 6.30 m mark is Duplantis's fourth world record in 2025, the most number of times he has improved the mark during a single year in his career.

Duplantis made two tweaks that made the difference after two initial failed attempts at 6.30 m. First, he changed the standards of the crossbar moving it five centimeters closer to the box where the pole is planted into which allowed him to change the angle of clearance. Duplantis also revealed later that his dad and coach Greg Duplantis had made the call for him to use a stiffer pole for the third attempt at 6.30 m to optimise his elevation. His earlier attempts at 6.30 m were made using the same pole he had used for his previous world records from 6.20 m to 6.29 m.

On 26 October, Duplantis was named 2025 European Athlete of the Year; his third time winning the award, a feat which has only previously been achieved by Great Britain's Mo Farah.

On 30 November, Duplantis was named World Athlete of the Year. He was unbeaten in 16 competitions and became the first men's pole vaulter in modern history to go undefeated for two successive years. He was the first field event athlete to win three men's athlete of the year awards, and only the third to win three or more, joining Usain Bolt (who won six) and Hicham El Guerrouj (who also won three).

=== 2026: 15th consecutive world record, 4th consecutive world indoor title & European title, first defeat in three years & withdrawal from diamond league final ===
On 12 March, Duplantis added another centimetre to his own world record at the Mondo Classic held in Uppsala, Sweden by jumping 6.31 m. This is his 15th world record and the second time he has set a world record in Sweden. After his 6.31 m clearance, Duplantis has surpassed Sergey Bubka's tally of 14 consecutive world records. That was also his 38th consecutive victory in competition, dating back to August 2023.

Duplantis made two technical adjustments behind his latest world record: a longer run up from 20 to 22 steps and a stiffer pole. For years, he experimented with a stiffer pole but struggled to make it work. He believed the extra momentum from the longer approach adopted in recent months enable him to bend the stiffer pole more effectively.

On 21 March, Duplantis become the first man to win four consecutive world indoor pole vault titles, after he claimed gold in the men's event at the 2026 World Athletics Indoor Championships in Toruń with a new championship record of 6.25 m. This was Duplantis's ninth senior global title. The last time he was beaten at a global or continental championships was back in 2019. Since then, he has won 12 major titles. With this latest indoor global title, he equalled Sergey Bubka's record haul of four world indoor titles.

After securing victory with a 6.25 m jump, Duplantis called it a night and did not attempt a new world record leaving World Athletics president Sebastian Coe to breathe a sigh of relief. Coe recounted telling Duplantis jokingly in Tokyo after he pocketed a bonus payment of $100,000 for his 14th world record that 'One more World Record, World Athletics loses its Christmas party, two more World Records, we lose the summer party.'

On 17 May, Duplantis cleared 6.12 m to set a meeting record and took victory at the Shanghai Diamond League.

On 27 May, a new dedicated children's ticket named after Mondo was released for the 14 August session of the Birmingham 2026 European Athletics Championships featuring the pole vault qualifying round. The 'Mondo Ticket', priced at just £6.31 to match the height of the current world record jump, was aimed at inspring young fans by offering them a chance to experience the championship and to see Mondo up close in action.

Duplantis had a busy year off the track having to balance marriage and a move to Monaco amid competitions. This has led to performance not quite to his usual levels. On 7 June, Duplantis registered his first defeat in nearly three years when he was edged out by Australian Kurtis Marschall in his home stadium at the Stockholm Diamond League. The defeat ended his 40 event winning streak that started since August 2023.

On 28 June, Duplantis bounced back to win Paris Diamond League with a new meeting record of 6.13 m. The competition was Duplantis' first event as a married man after his nuptials the week before.

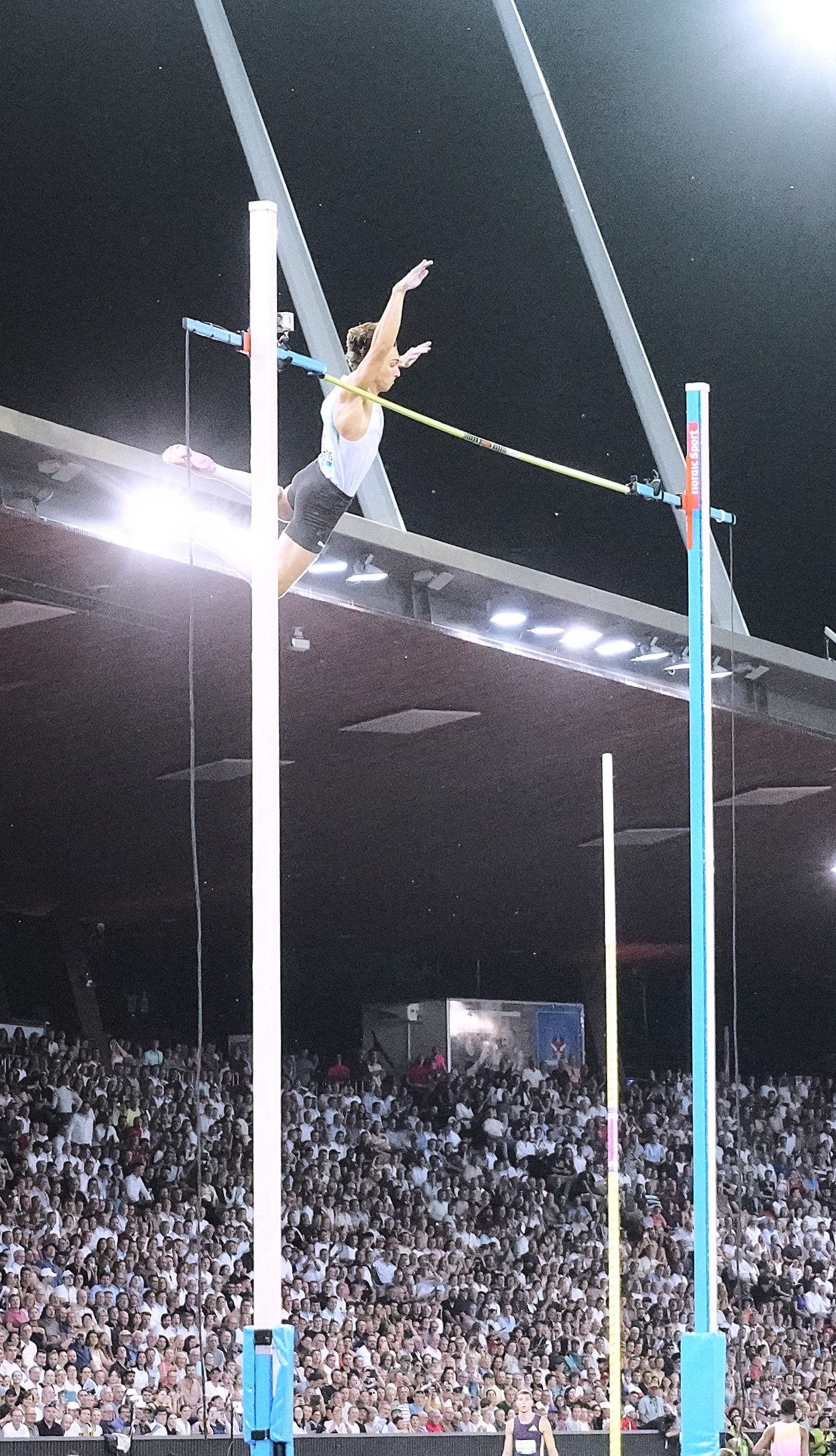
Armand Duplantis at 2026 Weltklasse Zürich on 27 August 2026.

On 10 July, Duplantis won the Monaco Diamond League with a clearance at 6.07 m, bettering his own meet record by 2 cm. In doing so, he registered his first victory as a resident of the Principality having relocated to Monaco from living in United States and Sweden in early 2026. Duplantis had persuaded the meet organisers to add men's pole vault event to his new home turf diamond league program that originally featured just the women's pole vault.

On 17 July, Duplantis had to retire from the London Diamond League competition early after clearing 5.95 m due to a thigh injury. He came in second to Sam Kendricks who won the meet with the same 5.95 m clearance but with zero failures.

On 16 August, Duplantis won the Birmingham 2026 European Athletics Championships with a clearance of 6.15 m, beating the championship record of 6.10 m. In doing so, Duplantis won his 14th senior gold medal and a fourth European title.

On 20 August, Duplantis cleared a meeting-record of 6.21 m to defeat Emmanouil Karalis in one of the greatest men's pole vault competitions in history at the Lausanne Diamond League city event. The competition saw unprecedented result with two athletes clearing 6.16 m or higher in the same competition for the first time.

On 21 August, World Athletics released 'Gold' the official anthem of 2026 World Athletics Ultimate Championship. 'Gold', an original song, written and performed by Duplantis with accompanying music video was launched globally ahead of the inaugural championship to be held in Budapest from 11 to 13 September.

On 27 August, Duplantis won the men's pole vault at 2026 Weltklasse Zürich with a meeting record 6.25 m, ahead of Emmanouil Karalis who set a new personal best of 6.20 m, the highest non-winning vault in history until then. The Zürich Diamond League witnessed for the first time two athletes (Karalis & Duplantis) attempting the world record 6.32 m in the same competition.

On 5 September, Duplantis pulled out of the Diamond League Brussels Final when an old leg injury he picked up from London flared up during warm up. This ended his bid for a sixth straight title after a strong 2026 campaign.

== Recognition ==
In July 2020, Duplantis received the Victoria Award, Sweden's highest sporting accolade. In December that year, he was awarded the Svenska Dagbladet Gold Medal or Bragdguldet for "the most significant Swedish sports achievement of the year," and in early 2021, the Jerring Award, recognizing him as the most popular athlete in Sweden that year; Duplantis expressed relief that the Swedish public had accepted and embraced him.

At the 2021 Swedish Sports Awards Gala held on 18 January, Duplantis received a total of four awards. Besides the Bragdguldet announced earlier in December 2020, Duplantis also took away the Radiosporten's Jerring Award and the Swedish Sports Academy's Sportsman of the Year and the Performance of the Year awards, his second for both awards. The awards came on the back of a watershed season in 2020 when he set his first two world records: 6.17 m and 6.18 m indoors and a world outdoor best: 6.15 m. On top of that, he was undefeated in 2020. Duplantis's parents Greg and Helena Duplantis also received the Coach of the Year award from the academy that evening at the gala.

Duplantis has won a number of awards from World Athletics. They included a Rising Star of the Year (Men) award in 2018 as well as four Athlete of the Year awards including three outright World Athlete of the Year awards in 2020, 2022 and 2023 (Men's field) and a Field Athlete of the Year award in 2024. The overall World Athlete of the Year in 2024 was won by Letsile Tebogo of Botswana. He has also won similar accolades from European Athletics Association. They included a Rising Star of the Year award in 2018 and three-time Athlete of the Year award in 2022, 2024 and 2025. Duplantis was named 2024 BBC Sports Personality World Sport Star of the Year. Duplantis was the recipient of the inaugural Sports Journalists' Association (SJA) International Sportsperson of the Year award in November 2025.

== Personal life ==
Encouraged by his mother, Duplantis took extensive lessons over Skype in order to improve his Swedish language fluency, and by 2020, felt that he understood native speech much better and faster than he could in the past. His mother claimed at the same time that while Duplantis felt shy about speaking Swedish in public, he was very happy to do so in private, where there was less pressure. By 2021, after winning Olympic gold in Tokyo, his knowledge of the language had improved to the point that he felt comfortable giving interviews fully in Swedish. Previously, Duplantis had lamented that improving his Swedish had been somewhat hampered by the high level of English skills in Sweden, which has led to native speakers preferring to speak English when talking with him.

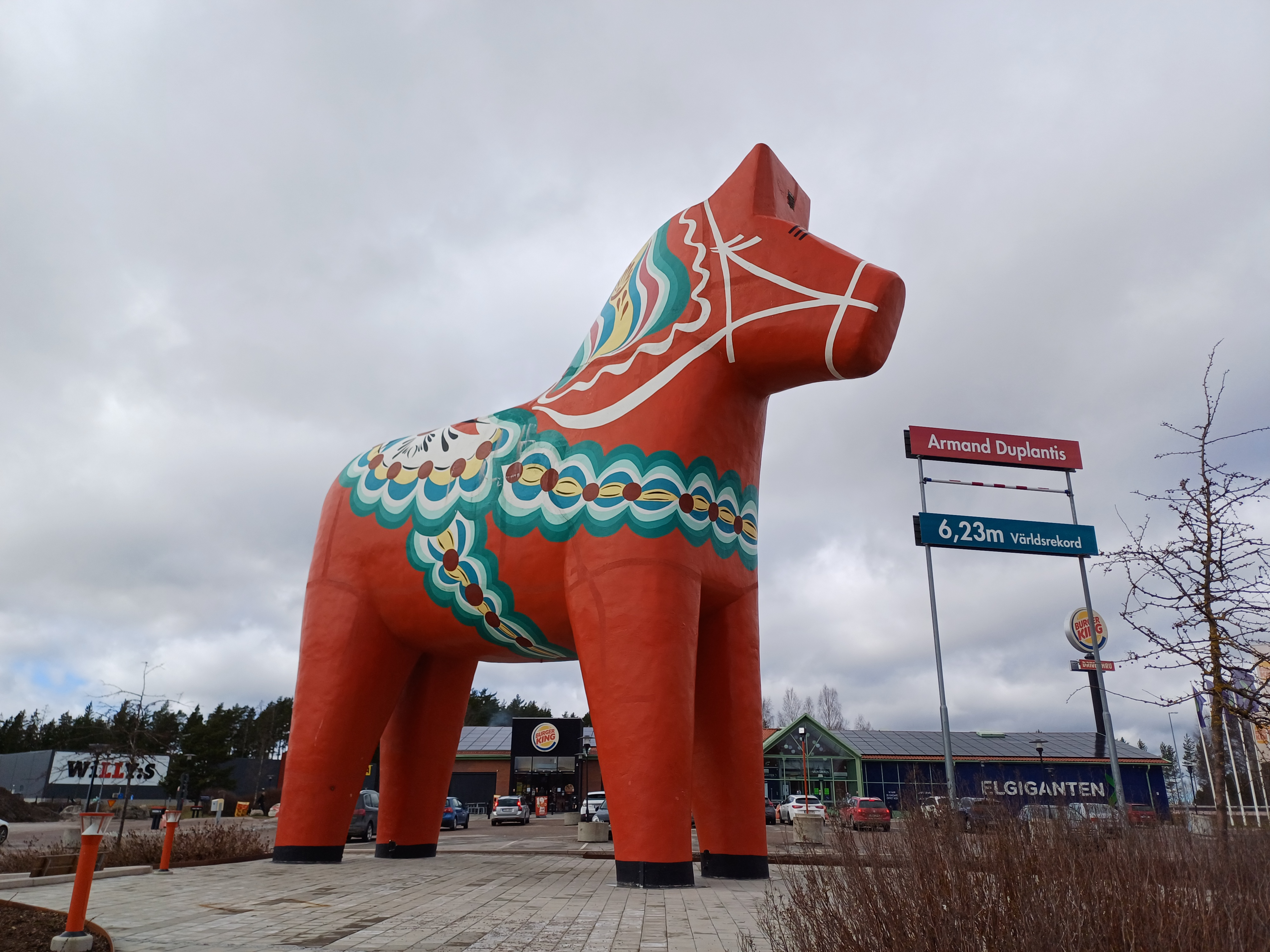
The bar next to the Dala horse in Avesta, Sweden, is raised every time Duplantis breaks his world record. (photo from April 2024)

Duplantis usually divides his year between winters in Louisiana and summers in Uppsala in Sweden, adapted for when the two climates offer the best possibilities for training. The municipality of Avesta, where Duplantis's mother was raised, erected a pole vault bar beside the gigantic Dala horse monument to showcase the height of his world record, something that made Duplantis "break down in tears" over the significance of what he had accomplished when he heard about it. In October 2025, Stockholm Arlanda Airport added Duplantis to its iconic "Welcome to my hometown" portrait gallery, a feature in the airport's baggage halls that has greeted travellers for since its launch in 2005. The gallery honours people who have made outstanding contributions to the Stockholm and Uppsala regions in areas such as sport, culture, innovation, and business.

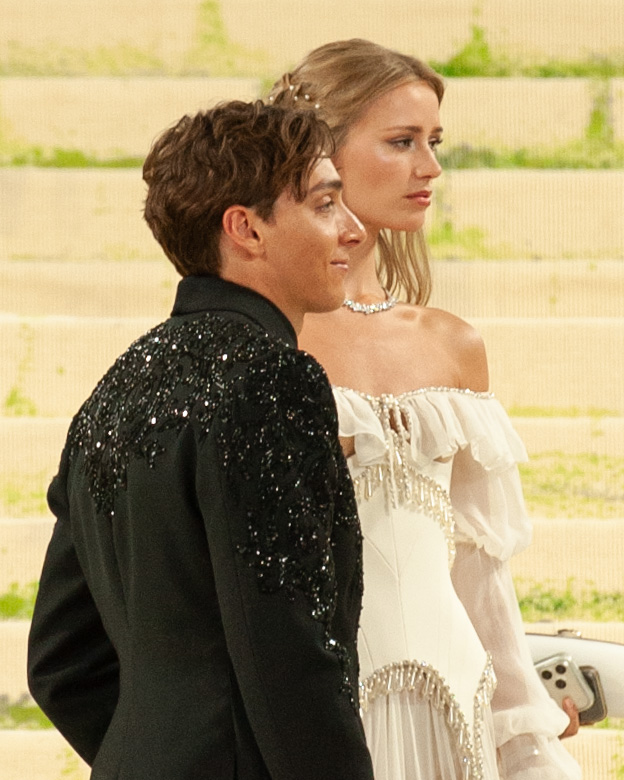
Duplantis and Inglander at the 2026 Met Gala

Duplantis married Swedish model and content creator Desiré Inglander in 2026. They had met at a midsummer party in Sweden in 2020 and announced their engagement in 2024 after a surprise proposal by Duplantis to Inglander during a photo shoot for Vogue Scandinavia in the seaside resort The Hamptons in New York. After his marriage, Duplantis sold his apartment in Stockholm and took up residency in Monaco after living in the United States and Sweden.

Duplantis released his first single, "Bop", under the name Mondo on 28 February 2025, which he wrote with Emil Berg and Rasmus Wahlberg. The three have written around 30 songs together, with two or three additional singles planned for release later in the year. "Bop" charted at number 31 on the singles chart in Sweden. He released numerous other singles following his debut including "4L" in June 2025, "Feelin' Myself" in February 2026 and "Location" in April 2026. In March 2026, World Athletics appointed Duplantis to create an official anthem for the inaugural 2026 World Athletics Ultimate Championship.

== Achievements ==
Information from World Athletics profile.

=== International competitions ===
Representing Sweden
Year	Competition	Venue	Position	Result	Notes
2015	World U18 Championships	Cali, Colombia	1st	5.30 m	CR
2016	World U20 Championships	Bydgoszcz, Poland	3rd	5.45 m	
2017	European U20 Championships	Grosseto, Italy	1st	5.65 m	CR
2017	World Championships	London, United Kingdom	9th	5.50 m	
2018	World Indoor Championships	Birmingham, United Kingdom	7th	5.70 m i	
2018	World U20 Championships	Tampere, Finland	1st	5.82 m	CR
2018	European Championships	Berlin, Germany	1st	6.05 m	CR WU20R
2019	World Championships	Doha, Qatar	2nd	5.97 m	
2021	European Indoor Championships	Toruń, Poland	1st	6.05 m i	CR
2021	Olympic Games	Tokyo, Japan	1st	6.02 m	
2022	World Indoor Championships	Belgrade, Serbia	1st	6.20 m i	WR CR
2022	World Championships	Eugene, United States	1st	6.21 m	WR CR
2022	European Championships	Munich, Germany	1st	6.06 m	CR
2023	World Championships	Budapest, Hungary	1st	6.10 m	
2024	World Indoor Championships	Glasgow, United Kingdom	1st	6.05 m i	
2024	European Championships	Rome, Italy	1st	6.10 m	CR
2024	Olympic Games	Paris, France	1st	6.25 m	WR OR
2025	World Indoor Championships	Nanjing, China	1st	6.15 m i	
2025	World Championships	Tokyo, Japan	1st	6.30 m	WR CR
2026	World Indoor Championships	Toruń, Poland	1st	6.25 m i	CR
2026	European Championships	Birmingham, United Kingdom	1st	6.15 m	CR
2026	World Ultimate Championships	Budapest, Hungary	1st	6.20 m	CR

=== Circuit wins and titles ===
- Diamond League - Exclude Promotional Events
  Pole vault champion (5): 2021, 2022, 2023, 2024, 2025
  - 2018 (1): Stockholm
  - 2019 (1): Palo Alto
  - 2021 (5): Oslo (MR), Stockholm (MR), Paris (MR), Brussels (MR), Zürich (MR)
  - 2022 (5): Doha, Eugene, Oslo (WL MR), Stockholm (MR DLR), Zürich (MR)
  - 2023 (6): Oslo, Stockholm, Chorzów Silesia, Zürich, Brussels (MR), Eugene (WR DLR MR)
  - 2024 (7): Xiamen (WR DLR MR), Shanghai, Stockholm, Paris, Lausanne (MR), Chorzów Silesia (WR DLR MR), Brussels (MR)
  - 2025 (7): Xiamen, Shanghai(MR), Olso (MR), Stockholm (WR DLR MR), Monaco (MR), Chorzów Silesia, Zürich
  - 2026 (3): Shanghai (MR), Paris (MR), Lausanne (MR)
- Diamond League - Promotional Events
  - 2020 (7): Olso, Monaco, Stockholm (WL MR), Lausanne (WL MR DLR), Brussels (MR), Rome (MR DLR), Doha (=MR)
  - 2022 (2): Lausanne (MR), Chorzów Silesia
  - 2024 (1): Zürich
  - 2025 (1): Eugene
  - 2026 (3): Monaco (MR), Chorzów Silesia, Zürich (MR)

=== World records and other milestones ===
World records and other milestones
Year	Age	Height	World age best	Notes	Meeting	Location	Date
2006	6	1.67			No data		
2007	7	2.33	X		No data		
2008	8	2.89	X		No data		
2009	9	3.20	X		No data		
2010	10	3.86	X		No data		
2011	11	3.91	X		No data		
2012	12	3.97 i	X		No data		
2013	13	4.15			No data		
2014	14	4.75 i			No data		
2015	15	5.30			World Youth Championships	Cali, Colombia	19 July
2016	16	5.51			SM-Veckan Sommar	Norrköping, Sweden	13 July
2017	17	5.90	X	WU20R	Texas Relays	Austin, Texas, United States	1 April
2018	18	6.05	X	WU20R	European Championships	Berlin, Germany	12 August
2019	19	6.00		CR	SEC Outdoor Track & Field Championships	Fayetteville, Arkansas, United States	11 May
2019	19	6.00			Finnkampen	Stockholm, Sweden	24 August
2020	20	6.17 i		WR #1 WU23B WITR	Copernicus Cup	Toruń, Poland	8 February
2020	20	6.18 i	X	WR #2 WU23B WITR	Müller Indoor Grand Prix	Glasgow, United Kingdom	15 February
2020	20	6.15		DLR WU23B	Golden Gala	Rome, Italy	17 September
2021	21	6.10 i			Serbian Open Indoor Meeting	Belgrade, Serbia	24 February
2021	21	6.10			Fanny Blankers-Koen Games	Hengelo, Netherlands	6 June
2022	22	6.19 i		WR #3	Belgrade Indoor Meeting	Belgrade, Serbia	7 March
2022	22	6.20 i		WR #4 CR	World Indoor Championships	Belgrade, Serbia	20 March
2022	22	6.16		DLR	BAUHAUS-galan	Stockholm, Sweden	30 June
2022	22	6.21	X	WR #5 CR	World Championships	Eugene, Oregon, United States	4 July
2023	23	6.22 i		WR #6 WITR	All Star Perche	Clermont-Ferrand, France	25 February
2023	23	6.23	X	WR #7 DLR	Prefontaine Classic	Eugene, Oregon, United States	17 September
2024	24	6.24		WR #8 DLR	Xiamen Diamond League	Xiamen, China	20 April
2024	24	6.25		WR #9 OR	Olympic Games	Saint-Denis, France	5 August
2024	24	6.26	X	WR #10 DLR	Kamila Skolimowska Memorial	Chorzów, Poland	25 August
2025	25	6.27 i		WR #11 WITR	All Star Perche	Clermont-Ferrand, France	28 February
2025	25	6.28		WR #12 DLR	BAUHAUS-galan	Stockholm, Sweden	15 June
2025	25	6.29		WR #13	Gyulai István Memorial	Budapest, Hungary	12 August
2025	25	6.30	X	WR #14 CR	World Championships	Tokyo, Japan	15 September
2026	26	**6.31**i	X	WR #15 WITR	Mondo Classic	Uppsala, Sweden	12 March

Key: Lifetime best (in bold)

=== Honours and awards ===
- Laureus World Sports Awards
  - Sportsman of the Year (Winner): 2025
  - Sportsman of the Year (Nominee): 2021, 2023, 2024 2026
- International Sports Press Association (AIPS) Best Athlete of the Year (Men)
  - 2022 (2nd), 2023 (2nd), 2024 (Winner), 2025 (Winner)
- Sports Journalists' Association International Sportsperson of the Year Award
  - 2025
- BBC Sports Personality of the Year Awards
  - BBC World Sport Star of the Year: 2024, 2025
- L'Équipe Champion of Champions
  - Internarional Male Athlete of the Year: 2024 (2nd), 2025 (2nd)
- PAP European Sportsperson of the Year Award
  - 2020 (3rd), 2022 (2nd), 2023 (3rd), 2024 (3rd), 2025 (Winner)
- Forbes 30 Under 30
  - North America List - Sports (2025)
- Time's 100 Most Influential People in Sports 2026
- The Swedish Victoria Award (2020)
- Swedish Sports Academy Awards (See: Svenska idrottsgalan)
  - Newcomer of the Year: 2018
  - Sportsman of the Year: 2019, 2021, 2022, 2024, 2025, 2026
  - Performance of the Year: 2019, 2021, 2025
- The Swedish Jerring Award: 2020 (Note: Award is depicted as a 2020 award in the award's Wikipedia page. However, it is presented by Swedish Sports Academy in January 2021 at a Swedish Sports Awards gala and is depicted as a 2021 award in the gala's website.)
- The Swedish Svenska Dagbladet Gold Medal: 2020, (Note: The award was announced in December 2020 but presented in January 2021 at the Swedish Sports Awards gala.) 2024
- World Athletics Awards
  - Rising Star of the Year (Men): 2018
  - World Athlete of the Year (Men's Overall Winner): 2020, 2022, 2023 (Men's field), 2025
  - World Athlete of the Year (Men's Field): 2023, 2024, 2025
- European Athletics Awards
  - Rising Star of the Year (Men): 2018
  - European Athlete of the Year (Men): 2022, 2024, 2025
  - European Athlete of the Month (Men): Apr 2017, Apr 2019, Feb 2020, Sep 2021, Jun 2022, Jul 2022
- Swedish Athletics Association Awards
  - Stora grabbars märke (or Big Boys Badge): 2019
- Athletics Weekly Readers' Choice Awards
  - International Male Athlete of the Year: 2022, 2023, 2024, 2025
  - Mel Watman Award for Performance of the Year: 2024, 2025
- Track & Field News Awards
  - World Men's Athlete of the Year: 2020 (MVP), 2022, 2024
- U.S. Track & Field and Cross Country Coaches Association (USTFCCCA) Award
  - The Bowerman: 2019 (Finalist)
  - Indoor South Central Field Athlete of the Year: 2019
- 2019 SEC Indoor Track & Field Awards
  - Men's Field Athlete of the Year
  - Men's Freshman Field Athlete of the Year
- 2019 SEC Outdoor Track & Field Awards
  - Men's Field Athlete of the Year
  - Men's Freshman Field Athlete of the Year

== Discography ==
=== Singles ===
Title	Year	Peak chart positions	Album
Title	Year	SWE	Album
"Bop"	2025	31	Non-album singles
"Feelin' Myself"	2026	43	Non-album singles

== Notes ==
Records
Preceded by Renaud Lavillenie	Men's pole vault world record holder 8 February 2020 –	Succeeded by Incumbent
Awards
Preceded by Karsten Warholm	Men's Track & Field Most Valuable Performer; 2020	Succeeded by Ryan Crouser
Preceded by Ryan Crouser	Men's Track & Field Most Valuable Performer; 2022	Succeeded by Ryan Crouser
Preceded by Tove Alexandersson	Svenska Dagbladet Gold Medal; 2020	Succeeded by Team Sweden (Malin Baryard-Johnsson, Henrik von Eckermann, and Peder Fredricson), show jumping
Preceded by Daniel Ståhl	Svenska Dagbladet Gold Medal; 2024	Succeeded by Incumbent
