= Lavillenie =

Lavillenie ([la.vi.lə.ni] or [la.vil.ni]) is a French surname. Notable people with the surname include:

- Renaud Lavillenie (born 1986), French pole vaulter
- Valentin Lavillenie (born 1991), French pole vaulter, brother of Renaud
