= 2022 World Athletics Championships – Men's pole vault =

Men's pole vault at the 2022 World Championships
- Venue: Hayward Field
- Dates: 22 July (qualification); 24 July (final)
- Competitors: 33 from 20 nations
- Winning height: 6.21 WR

Medalists
gold medal	Armand Duplantis	Sweden
silver medal	Chris Nilsen	United States
bronze medal	Ernest John Obiena	Philippines

Video on YouTube Official Video

The men's pole vault at the 2022 World Athletics Championships was held at the Hayward Field in Eugene on 22 and 24 July 2022. The winning margin was 0.27 metres which as of 2024 is the only time the men's pole vault has been won by more than 0.2 metres at these championships.

== Summary ==
The script was written 15 years before 2020 Olympic Champion and World Record holder Armand Duplantis was born. At the time, Sergey Bubka was the dominant pole vaulter. He would go to meets offering large bonuses for a world record, or a major championship. Step 1) get the feel of the runway while the other competitors max out. 2) set the bar to one centimeter above the world record. 3) fly over the bar. 4) collect the money and go home. During that period, Armand's father and coach (along with his mother Helena), Greg Duplantis was sometimes one of those other vaulters, watching. Years later, Yelena Isinbayeva made a career of doing the same thing. The world never got to articulate how good these athletes were at their best, only how good they needed to be to collect the bonus.

There was a $100,000 bonus for setting a World Record at these Championships. It took 5.75m to get into the final. There, 7 got over 5.80m with Duplantis and 2012 Olympic Champion / former World Record holder Renaud Lavillenie both passing. At 5.87m it was down to 7, with Duplantis and Chris Nilsen missing their first attempts, putting first attempt clearance by Ernest John Obiena and 2016 Olympic Champion Thiago Braz into a tie for the lead. At 5.94m, Duplantis and Nilsen cleared on their first attempts to take back the lead after Obiena missed his first attempt before clearing on his second to improve his own Asian record. Braz missed his first two and passed to try to make one last attempt at 6 metres. Duplantis cleared 6 with ease, the others had maxed out, Nilsen left with silver, Obiena bronze. Competition over, next Duplantis had to deal with records, first the Championship record, formerly 6.05m by Dmitri Markov from 2001. He flew over that one. With his name cemented into the record book, the next step, a big step, was the World Record. Duplantis had the bar set at 6.21 m (20 ft 4 1/4 in). His first time down the runway, it wasn't right. He aborted the remains of the attempt going under the bar. On his second attempt, he flew over the bar. It was time to celebrate, collect the medal and the paycheck. Duplantis took no further attempts.

The World Record bettered his own world record set indoors by winning the Indoor World Championships on the same script. It also bettered his own outdoor world record of 6.16m set at the Bauhausgalan meet in Stockholm less than a month earlier.

== Records ==
Before the competition records were as follows:

Record	Athlete & Nat.	Perf.	Location	Date
World record	Armand Duplantis (SWE)	6.20 m (i)	Belgrade, Serbia	20 March 2022
Championship record	Dmitri Markov (AUS)	6.05 m	Edmonton, Canada	9 August 2001
World Leading	Armand Duplantis (SWE)	6.16 m	Stockholm, Sweden	30 June 2022
African Record	Okkert Brits (RSA)	6.03 m	Cologne, Germany	18 August 1995
Asian Record	Ernest John Obiena (PHI)	5.93 m	Innsbruck, Austria	11 September 2021
North, Central American and Caribbean record	Sam Kendricks (USA)	6.06 m	Des Moines, United States	27 July 2019
South American Record	Thiago Braz (BRA)	6.03 m	Rio de Janeiro, Brazil	15 August 2016
European Record	Armand Duplantis (SWE)	6.20 m (i)	Belgrade, Serbia	20 March 2022
Oceanian record	Steven Hooker (AUS)	6.06 m (i)	Boston, United States	7 February 2009

== Qualification standard ==
The standard to qualify automatically for entry was 5.80 m.

== Schedule ==
The event schedule, in local time (UTC−7), was as follows:

Date	Time	Round
22 July	17:05	Qualification
24 July	17:25	Final

== Results ==
=== Qualification ===
The heats will start on 22 July at 17:05. Qualification: 5.80 m (Q) or at least 12 best performers (q).

Rank	Group	Name	Nationality	5.30	5.50	5.65	5.75	5.80	Mark	Notes
1	A	Armand Duplantis	Sweden	–	–	o	o		5.75	q
1	A	Chris Nilsen	United States	–	o	o	o		5.75	q
1	B	Oleg Zernikel	Germany	–	o	o	o		5.75	q
4	A	Thiago Braz	Brazil	–	o	xxo	o		5.75	q
5	B	Ben Broeders	Belgium	–	o	o	xo		5.75	q
6	B	Ernest John Obiena	Philippines	–	xo	o	xo		5.75	q
6	B	Ersu Şaşma	Turkey	o	o	xo	xo		5.75	q
8	A	Renaud Lavillenie	France	–	–	xxo	xo		5.75	q
9	A	Bo Kanda Lita Baehre	Germany	–	o	xo	xxo		5.75	q
9	B	Menno Vloon	Netherlands	o	xo	o	xxo		5.75	q
9	A	Pål Lillefosse	Norway	–	o	xo	xxo		5.75	q
9	B	Sondre Guttormsen	Norway	–	–	xo	xxo		5.75	q
13	A	Rutger Koppelaar	Netherlands	–	o	o	xxx		5.65	
14	A	Hussain Al-Hizam	Saudi Arabia	xo	o	o	xxx		5.65	SB
15	B	Seito Yamamoto	Japan	o	o	xo	xxx		5.65	
15	B	Simen Guttormsen	Norway	o	o	xo	xxx		5.65	
17	B	Luke Winder	United States	xo	o	xo	xxx		5.65	
18	A	Thibaut Collet	France	–	o	xxo	xxx		5.65	
19	A	Harry Coppell	Great Britain & N.I.	o	o	xxx			5.50	
19	B	Mikko Paavola	Finland	o	o	xxx			5.50	
19	A	Piotr Lisek	Poland	–	o	xxx			5.50	
22	A	Emmanouil Karalis	Greece	–	xo	xxx			5.50	
22	A	Tommi Holttinen	Finland	o	xo	xxx			5.50	SB
24	B	Huang Bokai	China	–	xxo	xxx			5.50	
24	B	Robert Sobera	Poland	–	xxo	xxx			5.50	
24	A	Kurtis Marschall	Australia	–	xxo	xxx			5.50	
27	A	Robert Renner	Slovenia	xo	xxo	xxx			5.50	
28	A	Germán Chiaraviglio	Argentina	xo	xxx				5.30	
	B	Andrew Irwin	United States	xxx					NM	
	B	Augusto Dutra	Brazil	–	xxx				NM	
	A	Torben Blech	Germany	xxx					NM	
	B	Valentin Lavillenie	France	–	xxx				NM	

=== Final ===
The final was started on 24 July at 17:25.

Rank	Name	Nationality	5.55	5.70	5.80	5.87	5.94	6.00	6.06	6.21	Mark	Notes
1st place, gold medalist(s)	Armand Duplantis	Sweden	–	o	–	xo	o	o	o	xo	6.21	WR
2nd place, silver medalist(s)	Chris Nilsen	United States	o	o	o	xo	o	xxx			5.94	
3rd place, bronze medalist(s)	Ernest John Obiena	Philippines	o	xo	o	o	xo	xxx			5.94	AR
4	Thiago Braz	Brazil	o	o	xo	o	xx–	x			5.87	
5	Oleg Zernikel	Germany	o	o	o	xo	xxx				5.87	PB
5	Renaud Lavillenie	France	–	o	–	xo	xxx				5.87	SB
7	Bo Kanda Lita Baehre	Germany	xo	xo	xxo	xxo	xxx				5.87	
8	Ersu Şaşma	Turkey	xo	xo	o	xxx					5.80	=NR
9	Pål Lillefosse	Norway	o	–	xo	xxx					5.80	
10	Sondre Guttormsen	Norway	o	o	xxx						5.70	
11	Ben Broeders	Belgium	xxo	o	xxx						5.70	
	Menno Vloon	Netherlands	xxx								NM	
