= Bop (Mondo song) =

2025 song by Mondo

Single by Mondo
- Released: 28 February 2025
- Genre: Pop
- Length: 2:30
- Label: Hoss, Sony Music Sweden
- Songwriters: Armand Duplantis; Emil Berg; Rasmus Wahlgren
- Producers: Wahlgren; Tobias Danielsson

Mondo singles chronology
"Bop" (2025)	"4L" (2025)

"Bop" is the debut single by Swedish and American pole vaulter Armand Duplantis under the name Mondo. It was released on 28 February 2025 through Sony Music Sweden under exclusive license by Hoss. It was written by Mondo, Emil Berg, and Rasmus Wahlgren, and produced by Wahlgren and Tobias Danielsson.

Mondo started recording songs to cope with stress during the lead-up to the 2024 Summer Olympics. Before 2025, he recorded demos of his music for a possible debut single and eventually chose "Bop". It mainly contains elements of rhythm and blues, pop, and Afrobeats. The song charted in Sweden, peaking at 31st.

== Background ==
Around 2023 in Stockholm, Swedish and American pole vaulter Armand Duplantis met songwriters Emil Berg and Rasmus Wahlgren and eventually formed a friendship with them. Duplantis wrote and recorded around 30 songs with Berg and Wahlgren to cope with stress during the lead-up to the 2024 Summer Olympics. He initially did not talk much about this songwriting as he was unsure whether he would release any of the songs.

A few months before 2025, Duplantis recorded demos of his music for a possible debut single and eventually chose "Bop". His family and fiancée Desiré Inglander supported his career in music, with Inglander telling him to release his chosen song. In January of the same year, Duplantis and Inglander appeared in the music video for "Chasing Paradise" by Kygo and OneRepublic as his first endeavor into released music. On 25 February 2025, Duplantis announced on social media that he would be releasing the single, uploading a clip of the song alongside the announcement.

== Release and composition ==
Using his nickname Mondo, Duplantis released "Bop" on 28 February 2025 through Sony Music Sweden under exclusive license by Hoss as his first single. During an interview with Agence France-Presse, he stated that he rushed to make and release the song in order for it to be played while he competed in the All Star Pole Vault competition in Clermont-Ferrand, France. At the competition, he placed first with a mark of 6.27 metres (20.6 ft), setting a world record in the men's pole vault.

"Bop" is two minutes and 30 seconds long. It was written by Duplantis, Berg, and Wahlgren, and produced by Wahlgren and Tobias Danielsson. During an interview with SVT Nyheter, Duplantis said he named the song "Bop" in reference to the American English terms of bop as a dance and a popular song. The song contains elements of rhythm and blues, pop, and Afrobeats, with influences from Swedish hip-hop and Swedish pop.

== Reception and commercial performance ==
Writing for Vogue Scandinavia, Linnéa Pesonen stated that the song was met with praise from fans upon its release, calling it an affirmation that the song "is, indeed, a bop." Also of Vogue Scandinavia, Allyson Shiffman named it "a breezy, catchy, nod-your-head type of tune". The song charted in Sweden, peaking at 31st on Sverigetopplistan.

2025 weekly chart performance
Chart (2025)	Peak position
Sweden (Sverigetopplistan)	31

== Personnel ==
Credits adapted from Apple Music:

- Mondo (Armand Duplantis) – vocals and songwriter
- Emil Berg – songwriter
- Rasmus Wahlgren – songwriter and producer
- Tobias Danielsson – producer
