= 2022 European Athletics Championships – Men's pole vault =

Men's pole vault at the 2022 European Athletics Championships
- Venue: Olympiastadion
- Location: Munich
- Dates: 18 August (qualification); 20 August (final)
- Competitors: 25 from 15 nations
- Winning height: 6.06 CR

Medalists
gold medal	Armand Duplantis	Sweden
silver medal	Bo Kanda Lita Baehre	Germany
bronze medal	Pål Haugen Lillefosse	Norway

The men's pole vault at the 2022 European Athletics Championships took place at the Olympiastadion on 18 and 20 August.

== Records ==
Standing records prior to the 2022 European Athletics Championships
World record	Armand Duplantis (SWE)	6.21 m	Eugene, Oregon, United States	24 July 2022
European record	Armand Duplantis (SWE)	6.21 m	Eugene, Oregon, United States	24 July 2022
Championship record	Armand Duplantis (SWE)	6.05 m	Berlin, Germany	12 August 2018
World Leading	Armand Duplantis (SWE)	6.21 m	Eugene, Oregon, United States	24 July 2022
Europe Leading	Armand Duplantis (SWE)	6.21 m	Eugene, Oregon, United States	24 July 2022

== Schedule ==
Date	Time	Round
16 August 2022	10:50	Qualification
18 August 2022	20:05	Final

All times are local times (UTC+2)

== Results ==
=== Qualification ===
Qualification: 5.80 m (Q) or best 12 performances (q)

Rank	Group	Name	Nationality	5.30	5.50	5.65	Result	Notes
1	A	Thibaut Collet	France	–	o	o	5.65	q
1	A	Rutger Koppelaar	Netherlands	–	o	o	5.65	q
1	B	Bo Kanda Lita Baehre	Germany	–	o	o	5.65	q
1	B	Oleg Zernikel	Germany	–	o	o	5.65	q
1	B	Torben Blech	Germany	o	xo	o	5.65	q
6	A	Armand Duplantis	Sweden	–	–	xo	5.65	q
6	A	Renaud Lavillenie	France	–	o	xo	5.65	q
6	B	Pål Haugen Lillefosse	Norway	–	o	xo	5.65	q
9	A	Sondre Guttormsen	Norway	–	xo	xo	5.65	q
9	B	Menno Vloon	Netherlands	xo	o	xo	5.65	q
11	B	Dominik Alberto	Switzerland	o	o	xxo	5.65	q, SB
12	B	Urho Kujanpää	Finland	o	xo	xxo	5.65	q, SB
13	A	Simen Guttormsen	Norway	o	o	xxx	5.50	
13	B	Emmanouil Karalis	Greece	o	o	xxx	5.50	
15	A	Ben Broeders	Belgium	–	xo	xxx	5.50	
15	B	Tommi Holttinen	Finland	o	xo	xxx	5.50	=SB
15	A	Piotr Lisek	Poland	o	xo	xxx	5.50	
15	B	Robert Sobera	Poland	o	xo	xxx	5.50	
19	A	Ersu Şaşma	Turkey	o	xxo	xxx	5.50	
20	A	Robert Renner	Slovenia	o	xxx		5.30	
21	A	Juho Alasaari	Finland	xxo	xxx		5.30	
21	B	Riccardo Klotz	Austria	xxo	xxx		5.30	
	A	Harry Coppell	Great Britain	xxr			NM	
	B	Valentin Lavillenie	France	–	xxx		NM	
	A	Max Mandusic	Italy	xxx			NM	

=== Final ===
Rank	Name	Nationality	5.50	5.65	5.75	5.85	5.90	5.95	6.06	Result	Notes
1st place, gold medalist(s)	Armand Duplantis	Sweden	–	o	–	o	o	o	or	6.06	CR
2nd place, silver medalist(s)	Bo Kanda Lita Baehre	Germany	o	xo	xo	xo	x-	xx		5.85	
3rd place, bronze medalist(s)	Pål Haugen Lillefosse	Norway	o	o	o	xxx				5.75	
4	Rutger Koppelaar	Netherlands	o	o	xo	xxx				5.75	SB
5	Thibaut Collet	France	o	xo	xo	xxx				5.75	
6	Sondre Guttormsen	Norway	xo	xo	xo	xxx				5.75	
7	Renaud Lavillenie	France	–	o	–	xxx				5.65	
8	Torben Blech	Germany	o	xxx						5.50	
9	Urho Kujanpää	Finland	xo	xxx						5.50	
9	Oleg Zernikel	Germany	xo	xxx						5.50	
	Dominik Alberto	Switzerland	xxx							NM	
	Menno Vloon	Netherlands	xxx							NM	
