= Oleg Zernikel =

German pole vaulter (born 1995)

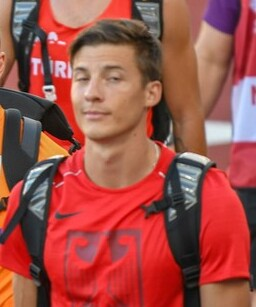
- Zernikel in 2022

Personal information
- Born: 16 April 1995 (age 31) Almaty, Kazakhstan
- Height: 1.85 m (6 ft 1 in)

Sport
- Sport: Athletics
- Event: Pole vault
- Club: ASV Landau
- Coached by: Jochen Wetter; Andrei Tivontchik
Medal record
Men's athletics
Representing Germany
European Championships
Bronze medal – third place	2024 Rome	Pole vault

Oleg Zernikel (born 16 April 1995) is a German athlete specialising in the pole vault. He represented his country at the 2021 European Indoor Championships finishing fourth. Earlier he won a bronze medal at the 2014 World Junior Championships.

His personal bests in the event are 5.80 metres outdoors (Braunschweig 2021) and 5.81 metres indoors (Berlin 2022).

At the age of eleven, Zernikel came with his family from Kazakhstan to Landau in the Palatinate. His father was a long and high jumper.

== International competitions ==
Year	Competition	Venue	Position	Notes
Representing Germany
2011	World Youth Championships	Lille, France	4th	4.80 m
2013	European Junior Championships	Rieti, Italy	6th	5.15 m
2014	World Junior Championships	Eugene, United States	3rd	5.50 m
2017	European U23 Championships	Bydgoszcz, Poland	5th	5.40 m
2021	European Indoor Championships	Toruń, Poland	4th	5.70 m
2021	Olympic Games	Tokyo, Japan	9th	5.70 m
2022	World Indoor Championships	Belgrade, Serbia	9th	5.75 m
2022	World Championships	Eugene, United States	5th	5.87 m
2022	European Championships	Munich, Germany	9th	5.50 m
2023	World Championships	Budapest, Hungary	14th (q)	5.70 m
2024	European Championships	Rome, Italy	3rd	5.82 m
2024	Olympic Games	Paris, France	9th	5.70 m
2025	European Indoor Championships	Apeldoorn, Netherlands	9th	5.60 m
2025	World Championships	Tokyo, Japan	23rd (q)	5.55 m
