= All Star Perche =

Annual indoor pole vaulting meeting

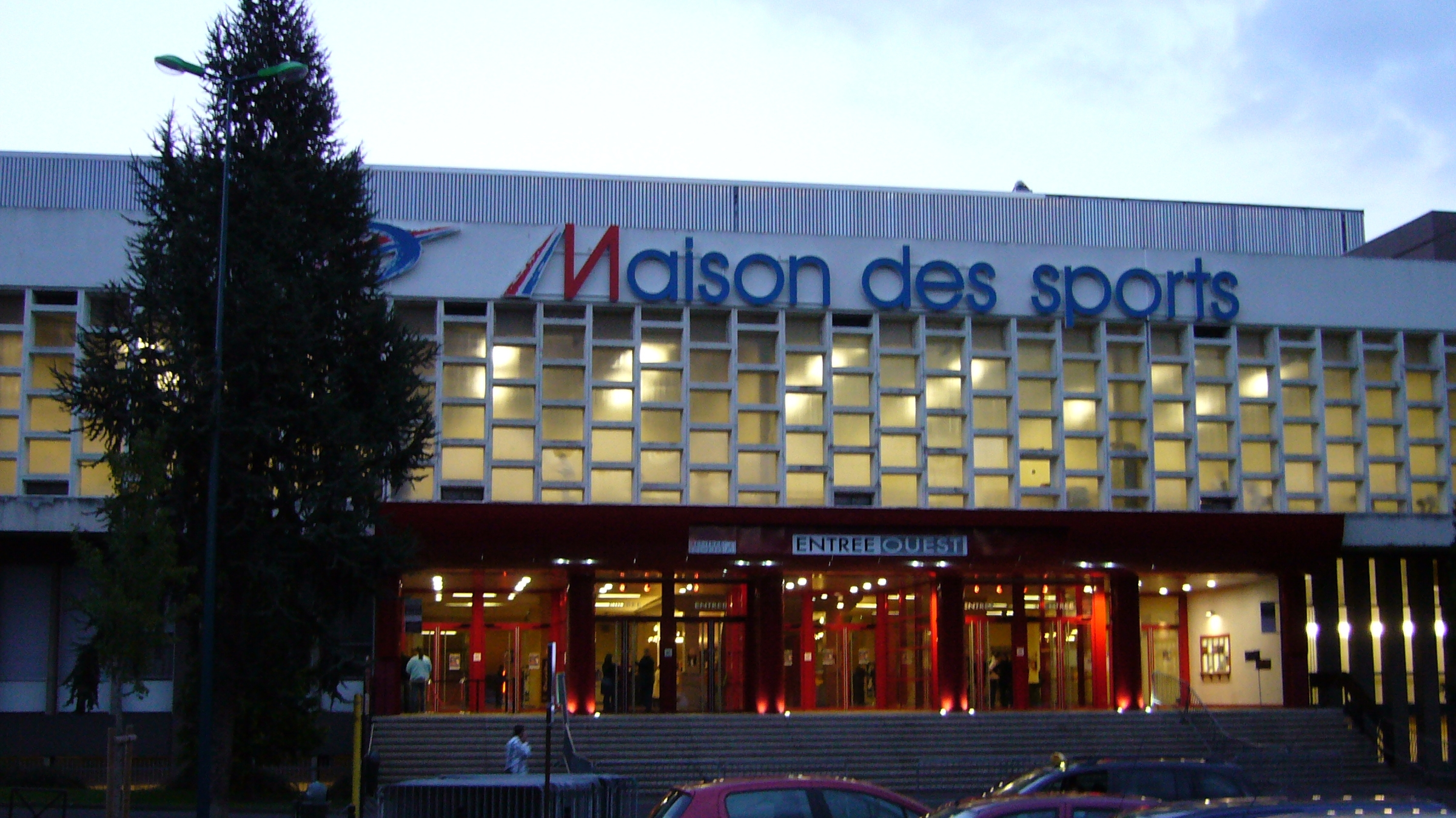
- The host venue
- Date: February
- Location: Clermont-Ferrand Sports Hall, Clermont-Ferrand, France
- Event type: Pole vault
- Established: 2016
- Website: All Star Perche

All Star Perche is an annual indoor pole vaulting meeting which is typically held in February at the Clermont-Ferrand Sports Hall in Clermont-Ferrand, France. The meeting was founded by world record-breakers Sergey Bubka and Renaud Lavillenie in 2016. Its creation was a response to the cessation of the annual Pole Vault Stars meeting in Donetsk (also organised by Bubka) due to the War in Donbas.

Organiser Lavillenie was the first men's winner at the competition, setting a meet record of 6.02 m (19 ft 9 in), which was the second best indoor mark that year. Two national records were also set at the first edition: Konstantinos Filippidis set a Greek record of 5.84 m while Robeilys Peinado set a Venezuelan record of 4.53 m. The 2017 edition was attended by around 4700 spectators and the meet was given European Athletics Indoor Permit Meeting status. The 2018 meeting showed strength in depth in the men's competition, with seven men clearing 5.88 m, which included a world under-20 record for Sweden's Armand Duplantis. Katie Nageotte won the women's competition on countback, with both her and Anzhelika Sidorova setting a meet record of 4.86 m, while Ninon Guillon-Romarin set a French record of 4.76 m. Piotr Lisek of Poland won the 2019 meet with a world leading performance of 5.93 m while Anzhelika Sidorova and Angelica Bengtsson shared the women's title with clearances of 4.81 m (a Swedish record for Bengtsson).

In 2022 Anzhelika Sidorova set a new meet record on the women's side with a 4.87 m jump. In 2023 Armand Duplantis beat the world record and therefore set a new meet record, with a 6.22 m jump. Duplantis repeated a world record performance in 2025 with 6.27 m.

== Meeting records ==
Division	Mark	Athlete	Country	Date
Men's	6.27 m	Armand Duplantis	Sweden (SWE)	28 February 2025
Women's	4.87 m	Anzhelika Sidorova	Russia (RUS)	19 February 2022

== Winners ==
Year	Men	Mark	Women	Mark
2016	Renaud Lavillenie (FRA)	6.02 m	Fabiana Murer (BRA)	4.71 m
2017	Shawnacy Barber (CAN)	5.83 m	Sandi Morris (USA)	4.71 m
2018	Sam Kendricks (USA)	5.93 m	Katie Nageotte (USA)	4.86 m
2019	Piotr Lisek (POL)	5.93 m	Angelica Bengtsson (SWE) Anzhelika Sidorova (RUS)	4.81 m
2020	Armand Duplantis (SWE)	6.01 m	Sandi Morris (USA)	4.80 m
2021	Renaud Lavillenie (FRA)	6.06 m	Holly Bradshaw (GBR)	4.78 m
2022	Menno Vloon (NED)	5.87 m	Anzhelika Sidorova (RUS)	4.87 m
2023	Armand Duplantis (SWE)	6.22 m	Amálie Švábíková (CZE)	4.66 m
2024	Armand Duplantis (SWE)	6.02 m	Alysha Newman (CAN)	4.83 m
2025	Armand Duplantis (SWE)	6.27 m	Angelica Moser (SUI)	4.76 m
2026	Armand Duplantis (SWE)	6.06 m	Amálie Švábíková (CZE)	4.76 m
