= Du swipa höger =

Single by Emil Berg
- Released: 12 June 2015
- Genre: pop
- Label: Giant Records

Emil Berg singles chronology
"Du swipa höger" (2015)	"Jag kommer aldrig kunna dö med dig" (2015)

"Du swipa höger" is the debut single by Swedish singer Emil Berg, which was released on 12 June 2015 by Giant Records. The song peaked at number two on the Swedish Singles Chart.

== Music video ==
The music video for the song was directed by Gustav Andersson and Martin Hultgren and uploaded by Emil Berg on 15 July 2015.

== Charts ==
=== Weekly charts ===
Chart (2015)	Peak position
Sweden (Sverigetopplistan)	2

=== Year-end charts ===
Chart (2015)	Position
Sweden (Sverigetopplistan)	46

== Certifications ==
Region	Certification	Certified units/sales
Sweden (GLF)	3× Platinum	24,000,000^{†}
^{†} Streaming-only figures based on certification alone.

== Release history ==
Region	Date	Format	Label
Sweden	12 Jun 2015	Digital download	Giant Records
