= Pål Haugen Lillefosse =

Norwegian pole vaulter

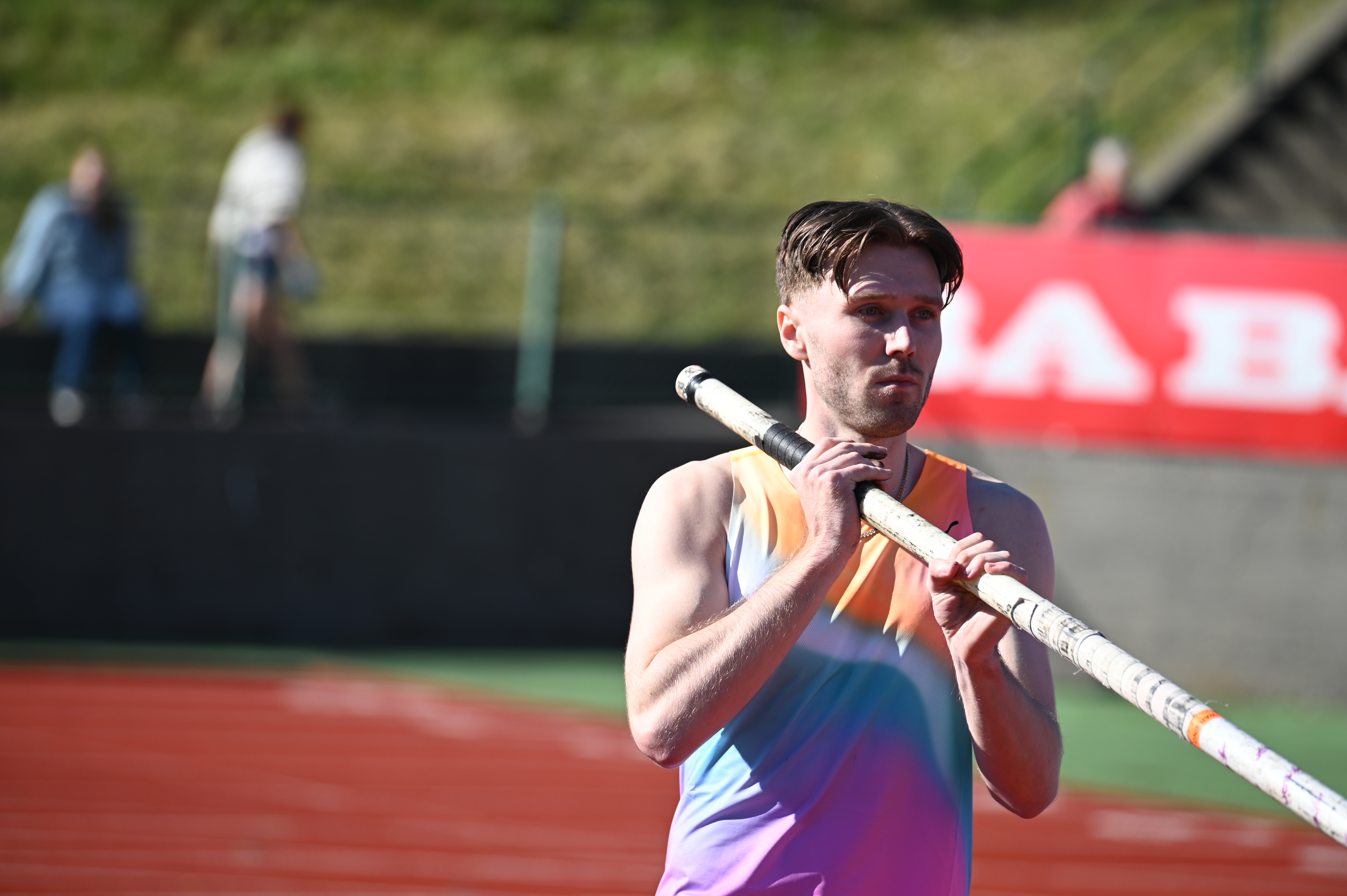
- Lillefosse in 2026

Personal information
- Born: 4 June 2001 (age 25)
- Height: 1.81 m (5 ft 11 in)

Sport
- Sport: Athletics
- Event: Pole vault
- Club: Fana IL
Medal record
European Championships
Bronze medal – third place	2022 Munich	Pole vault

Pål Haugen Lillefosse (born 4 June 2001) is a Norwegian athlete specialising in the pole vault. He won a gold medal at the 2019 European U20 Championships.

His personal bests are 5.86 metres outdoors (Stjørdal 2022) and 5.83 metres indoors (Uppsala 2022).

== International competitions ==
Year	Competition	Venue	Position	Event	Notes
Representing Norway
2017	European Youth Olympic Festival	Győr, Hungary	2nd	4 × 100 m relay	41.79
2017	European Youth Olympic Festival	Győr, Hungary	1st	Pole vault	5.00 m
2018	European U18 Championships	Győr, Hungary	3rd	100 m	10.72 s
2018	European U18 Championships	Győr, Hungary	11th (h)	Medley relay	1:59.58
2018	European U18 Championships	Győr, Hungary	1st	Pole vault	5.46 m
2019	European U20 Championships	Borås, Sweden	1st	Pole vault	5.41 m
2021	European U23 Championships	Tallinn, Estonia	5th	Pole vault	5.60 m
2022	World Indoor Championships	Belgrade, Serbia	10th	Pole vault	5.60 m
2022	World Championships	Eugene, United States	9th	Pole vault	5.80 m
2022	European Championships	Munich, Germany	3rd	Pole vault	5.75 m
2023	European Indoor Championships	Istanbul, Turkey	7th	Pole vault	5.60 m
2023	European U23 Championships	Espoo, Finland	3rd	Pole vault	5.60 m
2023	World Championships	Budapest, Hungary	–	Pole vault	NM
