= 2021 European Athletics Indoor Championships – Men's pole vault =

Men's pole vault event

The men's pole vault event at the 2021 European Athletics Indoor Championships was held on 6 March at 10:04 (qualification) and 7 March at 17:05 (final) local time.

== Medalists ==
Gold	Silver	Bronze
Armand Duplantis; Sweden	Valentin Lavillenie; France	Piotr Lisek; Poland

== Records ==
Standing records prior to the 2021 European Athletics Indoor Championships
World record	Armand Duplantis (SWE)	6.18	Glasgow, United Kingdom	15 February 2020
European record	Armand Duplantis (SWE)	6.18	Glasgow, United Kingdom	15 February 2020
Championship record	Renaud Lavillenie (FRA)	6.04	Prague, Czech Republic	7 March 2015
World Leading	Armand Duplantis (SWE)	6.10	Belgrade, Serbia	24 February 2021
European Leading	Armand Duplantis (SWE)	6.10	Belgrade, Serbia	24 February 2021

== Results ==
=== Qualification ===
Qualification: Qualifying performance 5.75 (Q) or at least 8 best performers (q) advance to the final.

Rank	Athlete	Nationality	5.20	5.35	5.50	5.60	5.70	5.75	Result	Note
1	Menno Vloon	Netherlands	–	o	xo	o	o		5.70	q
2	Oleg Zernikel	Germany	–	o	o	o	xo		5.70	q
3	Piotr Lisek	Poland	–	–	o	xo	xo		5.70	q
4	Armand Duplantis	Sweden	–	–	–	o	–		5.60	q
4	Valentin Lavillenie	France	–	–	o	o	–		5.60	q
4	Bo Kanda Lita Bähre	Germany	–	–	o	o	xxx		5.60	q
4	Ersu Şaşma	Turkey	–	o	–	o	–		5.60	q
4	Robert Sobera	Poland	–	o	o	o	xxx		5.60	q
9	Torben Blech	Germany	–	o	o	xo	xxx		5.60	
10	Ethan Cormont	France	–	xxo	o	xo	xxx		5.60	
11	Konstadinos Filippidis	Greece	xo	o	o	xxx			5.50	
12	Urho Kujanpää	Finland	–	o	xxx				5.35	
13	Charlie Myers	Great Britain	–	xo	xxx				5.35	
13	Paweł Wojciechowski	Poland	–	xo	xxx				5.35	
	Renaud Lavillenie	France							DNS	

=== Final ===
Rank	Athlete	Nationality	5.30	5.50	5.60	5.70	5.80	5.85	6.05	6.19	Result	Note
1st place, gold medalist(s)	Armand Duplantis	Sweden	–	–	o	–	o	o	xo	xxx	6.05	CR
2nd place, silver medalist(s)	Valentin Lavillenie	France	–	xo	o	xxo	o	xxx			5.80	=PB
3rd place, bronze medalist(s)	Piotr Lisek	Poland	–	o	–	o	xxo	xxx			5.80	=SB
4	Oleg Zernikel	Germany	o	o	o	o	xxx				5.70	
5	Ersu Şaşma	Turkey	o	–	o	xo	xxx				5.70	
5	Menno Vloon	Netherlands	o	o	–	xo	xxx				5.70	
7	Robert Sobera	Poland	o	o	xx–	x					5.50	
	Bo Kanda Lita Bähre	Germany	–	xxx							NM	
