= Turkey at the 2022 World Athletics Championships =

- WA code: TUR

in Eugene, United States 15 July 2022 – 24 July 2022
- Competitors: 7 (3 men and 4 women) in 7 events
- Medals: Gold 0 Silver 0 Bronze 0 Total 0

World Athletics Championships appearances (overview)
- 1983; 1987; 1991; 1993; 1995; 1997; 1999; 2001; 2003; 2005; 2007; 2009; 2011; 2013; 2015; 2017; 2019; 2022; 2023; 2025

Turkey competed at the 2022 World Athletics Championships in Eugene, United States, from 15 to 24 July 2022.

== Results ==
Tunisia entered 4 athletes.

Key

- Q = Qualified for the next round
- q = Qualified for the next round as a fastest loser or, in field events, by position without achieving the qualifying target
- NR = National record
- PB = Personal best
- SB = Season best
- N/A = Round not applicable for the event

=== Men ===
Track and road events

Athlete	Event	Heat		Semi-final		Final	
Athlete	Event	Result	Rank	Result	Rank	Result	Rank
Mikdat Sevler	110 m hurdles	13.61	26	Did not advance			
Yasmani Copello	400 m hurdles	49.83	19 q	51.49	22	Did not advance	

Field events

Athlete	Event	Qualification		Final	
Athlete	Event	Distance	Position	Distance	Position
Ersu Şaşma	Pole vault	5.75	6 q	5.80 =NR	8

=== Women ===
Track and road events

Athlete	Event	Heat		Semi-final		Final	
Athlete	Event	Result	Rank	Result	Rank	Result	Rank
Şilan Ayyildiz	1500 m	4:12.67	38	Did not advance			
Meryem Bekmez	20 km walk	—N/a				1:33:27 SB	18

Field events

Athlete	Event	Qualification		Final	
Athlete	Event	Distance	Position	Distance	Position
Tuğba Danışmaz	Triple jump	13.63	23	Did not advance	
Eda Tuğsuz	Javelin throw	NM		Did not advance	
