= Torben Blech =

German athlete

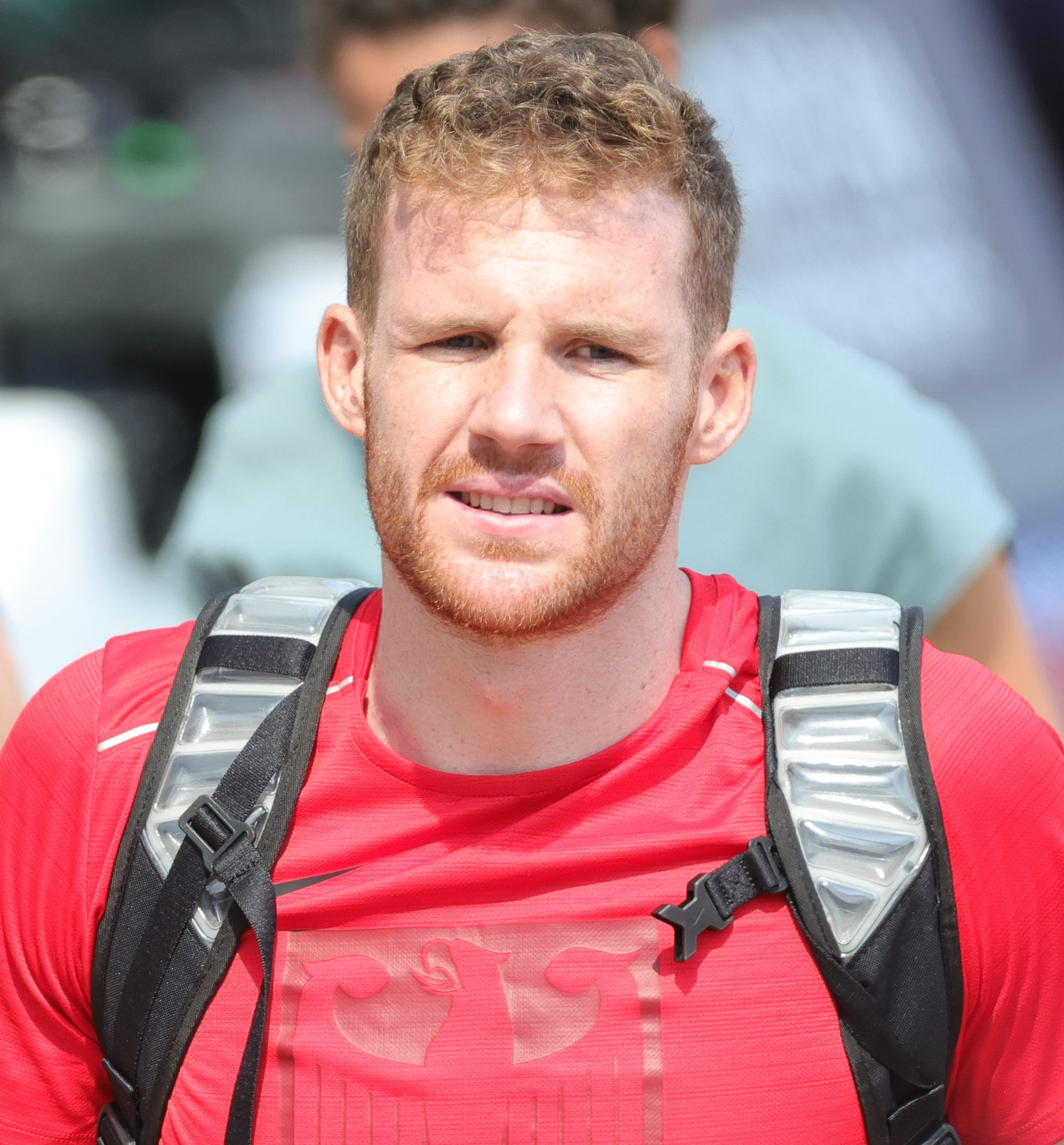
- Torben Blech in 2022

Personal information
- Born: 12 February 1995 (age 31)
- Education: University of Cologne
- Height: 1.93 m (6 ft 4 in)
- Weight: 84 kg (185 lb)

Sport
- Sport: Athletics
- Event: Pole vault
- Club: TSV Bayer 04 Leverkusen

Torben Blech (born 12 February 1995) is a German pole vaulter and former decathlete. He won a silver medal at the 2019 Summer Universiade.

His personal bests in the pole vault are 5.82 metres outdoors (Leverkusen 2023) and 5.86 metres indoors (Düsseldorf 2021).

== International competitions ==
Year	Competition	Venue	Position	Event	Notes
Representing Germany
2017	European U23 Championships	Bydgoszcz, Poland	9th	Decathlon	7675 pts
2019	Universiade	Naples, Italy	2nd	Pole vault	5.76 m
2019	World Championships	Doha, Qatar	23rd (q)	Pole vault	5.45 m
2021	European Indoor Championships	Toruń, Poland	9th (q)	Pole vault	5.60 m
2021	Olympic Games	Tokyo, Japan	25th (q)	Pole vault	5.30 m
2022	World Indoor Championships	Belgrade, Serbia	13th	Pole vault	5.60 m
2022	World Championships	Eugene, United States	–	Pole vault	NM
2022	European Championships	Munich, Germany	8th	Pole vault	5.50 m
2023	European Indoor Championships	Istanbul, Turkey	4th	Pole vault	5.80 m
2024	European Championships	Rome, Italy	6th	Pole vault	5.75 m
2024	Olympic Games	Paris, France	23rd (q)	Pole vault	5.40 m
2025	European Indoor Championships	Apeldoorn, Netherlands	12th (q)	Pole vault	5.65 m
2025	World Championships	Tokyo, Japan	30th (q)	Pole vault	5.40 m
