= Rutger Koppelaar =

Dutch pole vaulter (born 1993)

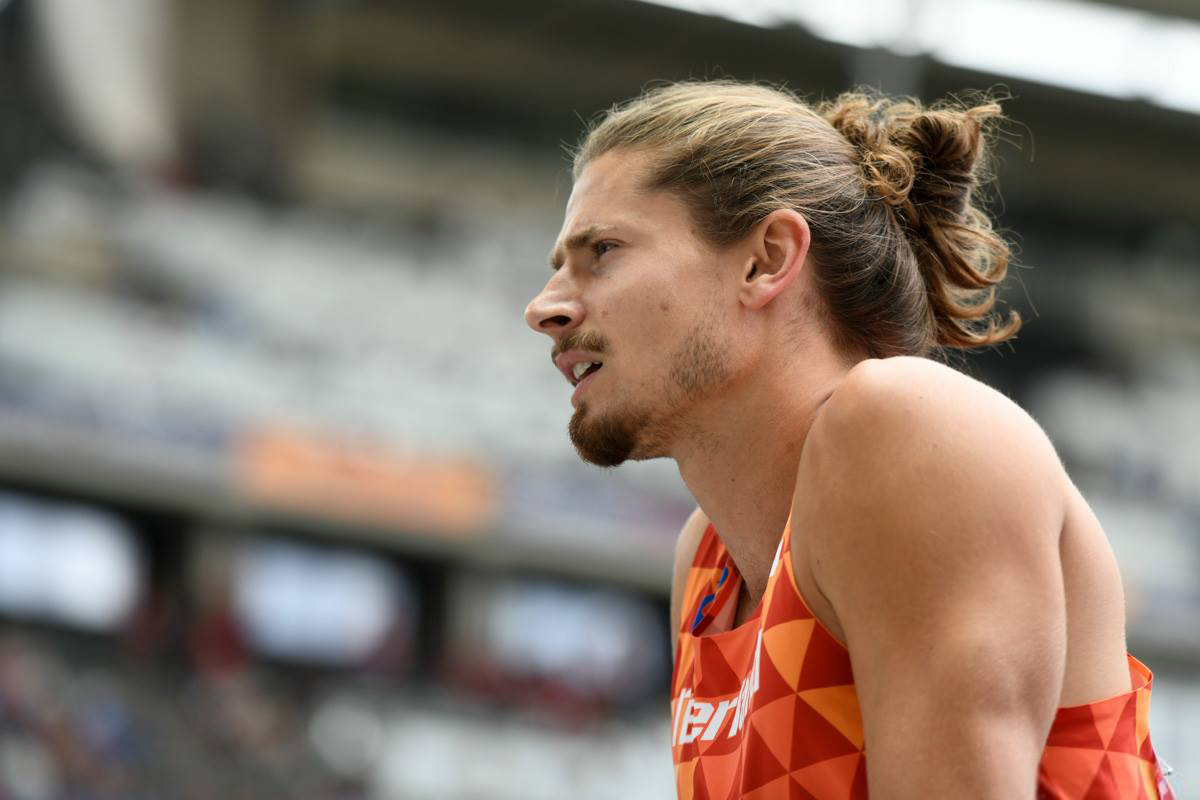
- Koppelaar at the 2018 European Championships

Personal information
- Born: 1 May 1993 (age 33) Dordrecht, the Netherlands

Sport
- Sport: Athletics
- Event: Pole vault
- Club: ARV Ilion
- Coached by: Robbert-Jan Jansen

Achievements and titles
- Personal bests: 5.81m (outdoors), 5.82m (indoors)

Rutger Koppelaar (Dutch: [ˈrʏtxər ˈkɔpəlaːr]; born 1 May 1993) is a Dutch athlete specialising in the pole vault. He represented his country at the 2019 World Championships in Doha without qualifying for the final. He qualified for the finals at the Europeans (Münich) in 2022 and got a 4th place with a height of 5.75m.

His personal bests in the event are 5.81m (outdoors, 2022) and 5.82m (indoors, 2023).

Koppelaar served a two-year competition ban ending in July 2016 in relation to an anti-doping rule violation after testing positive for excessive testosterone at an event in Germany in May 2014. Koppelaar appealed the ruling, but was unsuccessful.

== International competitions ==
Year	Competition	Venue	Position	Notes
Representing the Netherlands
2012	World Junior Championships	Barcelona, Spain	20th (q)	4.95 m
2013	European U23 Championships	Tampere, Finland	19th (q)	5.20 m
2018	European Championships	Berlin, Germany	31st (q)	5.16 m
2019	World Championships	Doha, Qatar	23rd (q)	5.45 m
2022	World Championships	Eugene, United States	13th (q)	5.65 m
2022	European Championships	Munich, Germany	4th	5.75 m
