= 2022 World Athletics Indoor Championships – Men's pole vault =

Men's pole vault at the 2022 World Athletics Indoor Championships
- Venue: Štark Arena
- Dates: 20 March
- Competitors: 13 from 9 nations
- Winning height: 6.20 WR

Medalists
gold medal	Armand Duplantis	Sweden
silver medal	Thiago Braz	Brazil
bronze medal	Christopher Nilsen	United States

The men's pole vault at the 2022 World Athletics Indoor Championships took place on 20 March 2022.

== Summary ==
Only 8th place Armand Duplantis and 12th place Thiago Braz da Silva returned from 2018. That statement belied their credentials. Braz was the 2016 Olympic Champion. Duplantis was an up and coming 18 year old, who has since won the 2020 Olympics and had set 4 world records in the event.

All 13 finalists were still in at 5.60m, which Duplantis used as his opening height. 8 cleared 5.75m while Duplantis passed. At 5.85m, only 4 would clear with Christopher Nilsen and Duplantis remaining clean. Only Nilsen cleared 5.90m, a height that eliminated Valentin Lavillenie, the younger brother of the defending champion Renaud Lavillenie, who had won this championship three times. Duplantis and Braz passed the height. In only his third attempt of the competition, Duplantis cleared 5.95m. It took Braz until his third attempt to redeem his passing at the lower height. That jump also improved upon his own South American record set six years earlier. Nilsen's third failure left him in bronze medal position. The next height was 6.05m, a height only six men had ever cleared. Duplantis cleared it easily to continue his clean round. The Championship was determined when Braz could not get over the bar.

Duplantis was not done. He asked for the bar to be set at 6.20 m (20 ft 4 in) which would be an improvement on the world record he had set in this same facility just 12 days earlier. Duplantis pulled out a new, stiffer pole. His first attempt was getting the feel of the new pole as he went under the bar. After an agonizing 15 minute delay for the men's 4x400 relay, his second attempt also met with similar results. After another 9 minute delay for the women's 4x400 relay, he quickly came down the runway after his name was called. His first legitimate attempt at the height got his hips well over the bar, but he brushed it on the way back down. The bar stayed up and it was a new world record.

== Results ==
The final was started at 16:35.

Rank	Athlete	Nationality	5.45	5.60	5.75	5.85	5.90	5.95	6.05	6.20	Result	Notes
1st place, gold medalist(s)	Armand Duplantis	Sweden	–	o	–	o	–	o	o	xxo	6.20	WR
2nd place, silver medalist(s)	Thiago Braz	Brazil	–	o	o	xo	–	xxo	xxx		5.95	AR
3rd place, bronze medalist(s)	Christopher Nilsen	United States	o	o	o	o	xo	xxx			5.90	
4	Valentin Lavillenie	France	o	o	xo	xo	xxx				5.85	SB
5	Ben Broeders	Belgium	o	o	o	xx–	x				5.75	SB
5	Menno Vloon	Netherlands	o	o	o	xxx					5.75	
7	Kurtis Marschall	Australia	xo	o	o	xxx					5.75	
8	Sondre Guttormsen	Norway	o	xxo	o	xxx					5.75	
9	Oleg Zernikel	Germany	xo	o	xxo	xxx					5.75	
10	Pål Haugen Lillefosse	Norway	o	o	xxx						5.60	
10	KC Lightfoot	United States	o	o	xxx						5.60	
12	Thibaut Collet	France	o	xo	xxx						5.60	
13	Torben Blech	Germany	o	xxo	xxx						5.60	
