= Johanna Duplantis =

Swedish athlete (born 2002)

Personal information
- Born: 24 July 2002 (age 24)

Sport
- Sport: Athletics
- Event: Pole vault

Achievements and titles
- Personal bests: Pole vault: 4.39m (Eugene, 2025)

Johanna Duplantis (born 24 September 2002) is a Swedish pole vaulter. She is the sister of fellow pole vaulter Armand Duplantis.

== Biography ==
Duplantis grew up in Lafayette, Louisiana in the United States of Swedish descent. Her parents Greg and Helene were also athletes who competed in pole vault and heptathlon, respectively. The youngest of four siblings, her old brothers Andrea and Armand also compete in pole vault. Her older brother Antoine competed in college baseball. She started in pole vault at a young age using facilities in the garden of her family home, and her mother acted as her physical trainer. She attended Lafayette High School where she competed in soccer as well as athletics.

As well as growing up in the United States she would regularly visit Sweden with her family and committed to compete internationally for Sweden. She was Swedish junior champion in the pole vault as well as a multiple-time Louisiana state age-group champion. She later attended Louisiana State University. She qualified for the final of the 2025 NCAA Division I Outdoor Track and Field Championships in June 2025, competing for the LSU Tigers, placing eleventh overall with a clearance of 4.39 metres.

She made the decision to turn professional and be based in Europe for the remainder of the 2025 season and placed fourth overall at the senior Swedish Athletics Championships in Karlstad. In August 2025, she signed a professional contract with Puma. She made her professional debut at the Istvan Gyulai Memorial, on a World Athletics Continental Tour Gold meeting, in Budapest, Hungary later that month. She competed for Sweden for the first time at the Finnkampen tournament in Stockholm in August 2025, placing sixth.
