= Valentin Lavillenie =

French pole vaulter (born 1991)

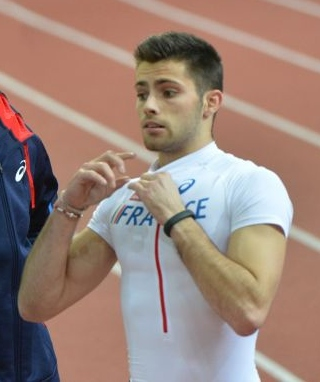
- Lavillenie at the 2015 European Indoor Championships

Personal information
- Born: 16 July 1991 (age 35) Barbezieux-Saint-Hilaire, France
- Agent: Benjamin Soreau
- Height: 1.71 m (5 ft 7 in)
- Weight: 66 kg (146 lb)

Sport
- Country: France
- Sport: Athletics
- Event: Pole vault
- Club: Clermont Athlétisme Auvergne; SCO Ste Marguerite Athlétisme
- Coached by: Sébastien Reisdorffer

Achievements and titles
- Personal bests: Outdoor: 5.82 m (2019); Indoor: 5.80 m (2015, 2021)
Medal record
Men's athletics
Representing France
European Indoor Championships
Silver medal – second place	2021 Toruń	Pole vault

Valentin Lavillenie (French pronunciation: [valɑ̃tɛ̃ la.vi.lə.ni] or [valɑ̃tɛ̃ la.vil.ni]; born 16 July 1991) is a French athlete specialising in the pole vault. He won the gold medal at the 2013 Jeux de la Francophonie. Lavillenie is the younger brother of another pole vaulter, a former world record holder, Renaud Lavillenie.

== Competition record ==
Year	Competition	Venue	Position	Notes
Representing France
2013	Mediterranean Games	Mersin, Turkey	5th	5.40 m
2013	European U23 Championships	Tampere, Finland	3rd	5.50 m
2013	World Championships	Moscow, Russia	11th (q)	5.55 m (Note: No mark in the final)
2013	Jeux de la Francophonie	Nice, France	1st	5.50 m
2015	European Indoor Championships	Prague, Czech Republic	6th	5.65 m
2017	World Championships	London, United Kingdom	14th (q)	5.60 m
2019	World Championships	Doha, Qatar	6th	5.70 m
2021	European Indoor Championships	Toruń, Poland	2nd	5.80 m
2021	Olympic Games	Tokyo, Japan	17th (q)	5.65 m
2022	World Indoor Championships	Belgrade, Serbia	4th	5.85 m
2022	World Championships	Eugene, United States	–	NM
2022	European Championships	Munich, Germany	–	NM
2023	European Indoor Championships	Istanbul, Turkey	15th (q)	5.40 m
