= Emil Berg =

Swedish singer-songwriter

Emil Berg is a Swedish singer-songwriter from Linköping. He had a debut hit with "Du swipa höger" making it to number 2 on the Swedish Singles Chart. His follow-up release was the single "Jag kommer aldrig kunna dö med dig".

== Discography ==
Adapted from Spotify.

=== Singles ===
Year	Title	Peak positions	Certification
Year	Title	SWE	Certification
2015	"Du swipa höger"	2	SWE: 2× Platinum
2015	"Jag kommer aldrig kunna dö med dig"	—	
2016	"Britney"	—	
2017	"Borde kanske dra"	—	
2017	"Flashiga liv"	—	
2017	"Kyss mig hårt"	—	
2017	"Allt e bra nu"	—	
