= 2023 European Athletics U23 Championships – Men's pole vault =

Men's pole vault at the 2023 European Athletics U23 Championships
- Venue: Leppävaara Stadium
- Location: Espoo, Finland
- Dates: 15 July (qualification); 16 July (final)
- Competitors: 25 from 16 nations
- Winning height: 5.71 m

Medalists
gold medal	Juho Alasaari	Finland
silver medal	Robin Emig	France
bronze medal	Pål Haugen Lillefosse	Norway

The men's pole vault event at the 2023 European Athletics U23 Championships was held in Espoo, Finland, at Leppävaara Stadium on 15 and 16 July.

== Records ==
Prior to the competition, the records were as follows:

European U23 record	Armand Duplantis (SWE)	6.18	Glasgow, Scotland	15 February 2020
Championship U23 record	Romain Mesnil (FRA)	5.93	Gothenburg, Sweden	1 August 1999

== Results ==
=== Qualification ===
Qualification rule: 5.45 (Q) or the 12 best results (q) qualified for the final.

Rank	Group	Name	Nationality	4.90	5.05	5.20	5.35	Results	Notes
1	B	Robin Emig	France	–	–	–	o	5.35 m	q
1	A	Pedro Buaró	Portugal	–	o	o	o	5.35 m	q
1	A	Baptiste Thiery	France	–	–	–	o	5.35 m	q
4	A	Valters Kreišs	Latvia	–	xo	o	o	5.35 m	q
4	A	Matteo Oliveri	Italy	–	–	xo	o	5.35 m	q
6	A	Anthony Ammirati	France	–	–	–	xo	5.35 m	q
6	B	Juho Alasaari	Finland	–	–	o	xo	5.35 m	q
6	B	Pål Haugen Lillefosse	Norway	–	–	–	xo	5.35 m	q
9	B	Juan Luis Bravo	Spain	xo	xo	xo	xxo	5.35 m	q
10	B	Ivan Paravac	Croatia	–	o	o	xxx	5.20 m	q
11	A	Fabio Wünsche	Germany	–	xxo	o	xxr	5.20 m	q
12	A	Ander Martinez	Spain	xo	xxo	o	xxx	5.20 m	q
13	B	Oleksandr Onufriyev	Ukraine	–	–	xo	xxx	5.20 m	
13	A	Albin Lundberg	Finland	o	o	xo	xxx	5.20 m	
13	A	Louis Pröbstle	Germany	–	o	xo	xxx	5.20 m	
16	A	Nicolas Pfrommer	Switzerland	o	o	xxx		5.05 m	
16	B	Francesco Pugno	Italy	o	o	xxx		5.05 m	
18	A	Evgeni Enev	Bulgaria	–	xo	xxx		5.05 m	
19	B	Oliver Latzelsberger	Austria	xo	xo	xxx		5.05 m	
20	A	Marcell Nagy	Hungary	xxo	xo	xxx		5.05 m	
21	B	Luke Zenker	Germany	o	xxo	xxx		5.05 m	
22	B	Antonio Santas	Greece	o	xxx			4.90 m	
22	A	Bartosz Marciniewicz	Poland	o	xxx			4.90 m	
24	B	Márton Böndör	Hungary	xxo	xxx			4.90 m	
	B	Artur Coll	Spain	–	x–	–	r	NM	
	B	Eerik Haamer	Estonia	DNS					

=== Final ===
Rank	Name	Nationality	5.00	5.20	5.35	5.50	5.60	5.66	5.71	5.76	Result	Notes
1st place, gold medalist(s)	Juho Alasaari	Finland	–	–	o	xo	o	xxo	o	xxr	5.71 m	=NU23R
2nd place, silver medalist(s)	Robin Emig	France	–	–	xo	o	o	xo	x–	xx	5.66 m	
3rd place, bronze medalist(s)	Pål Haugen Lillefosse	Norway	–	–	xo	o	o	xxo	x-	xx	5.60 m	
4	Valters Kreišs	Latvia	–	o	o	xo	xo	xxx			5.60 m	PB
5	Anthony Ammirati	France	–	–	xxo	o	xx–	x			5.50 m	
6	Baptiste Thiery	France	–	–	o	xo	xxx				5.50 m	
7	Matteo Oliveri	Italy	–	–	o	xxx					5.35 m	
8	Ander Martinez de Rituerto	Spain	o	xo	xxx						5.20 m	
9	Ivan Paravac	Croatia	xo	xxo	xxx						5.20 m	
10	Fabio Wünsche	Germany	o	xxx							5.00 m	
11	Juan Luis Bravo	Spain	xo	xxx							5.00 m	
—	Pedro Buaró	Portugal	–	xx–	x						NM	
