= 2026 European Athletics Championships – Men's pole vault =

Men's pole vault at the 2026 European Athletics Championships
- Venue: Alexander Stadium
- Location: Birmingham, United Kingdom
- Dates: 14 August 2026 (qualification); 16 August 2026 (final)
- Competitors: 30 (target)

Medalists
gold medal	Armand Duplantis	Sweden
silver medal	Emmanouil Karalis	Greece
bronze medal	Baptiste Thiery	France

The men's pole vault at the 2026 European Athletics Championships took place over two rounds at the Alexander Stadium in Birmingham, United Kingdom, on 14 and 16 August 2026.

== Background ==
Records before the 2026 European Athletics Championships
Record	Athlete (nation)	Height	Location	Date
World record	Armand Duplantis (SWE)	6.31 m	Uppsala, Sweden	12 March 2026
European record	Armand Duplantis (SWE)	6.31 m	Uppsala, Sweden	12 March 2026
World leading	Armand Duplantis (SWE)	6.31 m	Uppsala, Sweden	12 March 2026
European leading	Armand Duplantis (SWE)	6.31 m	Uppsala, Sweden	12 March 2026
Championship record	Armand Duplantis (SWE)	6.10 m	Rome, Italy	12 June 2024

== Qualification ==
For the men's pole vault, the qualification period was from 27 July 2025 to 26 July 2026. Athletes qualified by achieving the entry standard of 5.82 m or better, by wildcard for the 2024 European Athletics Champion, or by their position on the World Athletics Rankings for the event. The target number was 30 athletes.

Qualification standings per 31 July 2026
QP	CP	Country	Athlete	Status	Details
1	1	Sweden	Armand Duplantis	Qualified by Wild Card	Defending European Champion
2	1	Greece	Emmanouil Karalis	Qualified by Entry Standard	6.17 - Olympic Sports Complex of Paiania, Athina (GRE) (i) - 28 FEB 2026
3	1	Norway	Sondre Guttormsen	Qualified by Entry Standard	6.06 - Complexe Kindarena, Rouen (FRA) (i) - 07 MAR 2026
4	1	France	Baptiste Thiery	Qualified by Entry Standard	5.93 - Stade Charléty, Paris (FRA) - 28 JUN 2026
5	1	Turkey	Ersu Şaşma	Qualified by Entry Standard	5.92 - Olympiastadion, Berlin (GER) - 27 JUL 2025
6	1	Netherlands	Menno Vloon	Qualified by Entry Standard	5.92 - Olympiastadion, Berlin (GER) - 27 JUL 2025
7	2	France	Robin Emig	Qualified by Entry Standard	5.92 - Piazza Zanardelli, Chiari (ITA) - 01 SEP 2025
8	3	France	Thibaut Collet	Qualified by Entry Standard	5.91 - Pl. Panathinaikou Stadiou, Athina (GRE) - 05 JUL 2026
9	1	Germany	Bo Kanda Lita Baehre	Qualified by Entry Standard	5.90 - Estadio Vallehermoso, Madrid (ESP) - 16 JUL 2026
10	1	Portugal	Pedro Buaró	Qualified by Entry Standard	5.85 - Estadio Vallehermoso, Madrid (ESP) - 16 JUL 2026
reserve	4	France	Mathieu Collet	Qualified by Entry Standard	5.82 - Stadium Municipal, Albi (FRA) - 26 JUL 2026
11	1	Belgium	Ben Broeders	Qualified by World Rankings	10th - 1266 points
12	1	Poland	Piotr Lisek	Qualified by World Rankings	12th - 1255 points
13	1	Czech Republic	David Holý	Qualified by World Rankings	18th - 1226 points
14	1	Latvia	Valters Kreišs	Qualified by World Rankings	19th - 1226 points
15	1	Great Britain & N.I.	Owen Heard	Qualified by World Rankings	21st - 1213 points
16	2	Greece	Ioannis Rizos	Qualified by World Rankings	22nd - 1212 points
17	1	Italy	Matteo Oliveri	Qualified by World Rankings	25th - 1207 points
18	1	Finland	Juho Alasaari	Qualified by World Rankings	27th - 1206 points
19	1	Ukraine	Oleksandr Onufriyev	Qualified by World Rankings	28th - 1204 points
20	2	Belgium	Ylio Philtjens	Qualified by World Rankings	29th - 1199 points
21	2	Sweden	William Asker	Qualified by World Rankings	34th - 1191 points
22	1	Croatia	Ivan Geronimo Šerić	Qualified by World Rankings	37th - 1189 points
23	2	Germany	Gillian Ladwig	Qualified by World Rankings	38th - 1188 points
24	2	Ukraine	Vladislav Malykhin	Qualified by World Rankings	40th - 1187 points
25	2	Italy	Simone Bertelli	Qualified by World Rankings	41st - 1187 points
26	3	Sweden	Oliver Sandberg	Qualified by World Rankings	44th - 1177 points
27	2	Czech Republic	Dan Bárta	Qualified by World Rankings	47th - 1168 points
28	1	Estonia	Robert Kompus	Qualified by World Rankings	48th - 1167 points
29	2	Estonia	Henri Apri	Qualified by World Rankings	49th - 1160 points
30	1	Switzerland	Justin Fournier	Qualified by World Rankings	52nd - 1151 points
reserve	1	Austria	Riccardo Klotz	Next best by World Rankings	58th - 1141 points
reserve	2	Norway	Pål Haugen Lillefosse	Next best by World Rankings	60th - 1137 points
reserve	1	Cyprus	Dimitris Christofi	Next best by World Rankings	89th - 1098 points
reserve	2	Cyprus	Christos Tamanis	Next best by World Rankings	98th - 1088 points

Bye to semi-finals	Reserve activated	Withdrawal / reserve unused

== Schedule ==
Date	Time	Round
14 August 2026	11:05	Qualification.
16 August 2026	19:30	Final

All times are local times (UTC+1)

== Results ==
=== Qualification ===
The qualification round was held on 14 August 2026, at 11:05 in the morning. All athletes meeting the Qualification Standard (Q) of 5.80 m or at least 12 best performers (q) advanced to the final.

==== Group A ====
Place	Athlete	Nation	5.25	5.45	5.60	5.70	Result	Notes
1	Armand Duplantis	Sweden	-	-	o		5.60 m	q
1	Emmanouil Karalis	Greece	-	-	o		5.60 m	q
1	Bo Kanda Lita Baehre	Germany	-	-	o		5.60 m	q
4	Baptiste Thiery	France	-	xxo	o		5.60 m	q
5	Sondre Guttormsen	Norway	-	o	xo		5.60 m	q
6	Pedro Buaró	Portugal	-	xo	xo		5.60 m	q
7	Juho Alasaari	Finland	o	o	xxo		5.60 m	q
8	Ben Broeders	Belgium	-	xxo	xxo		5.60 m	q
9	Gillian Ladwig	Germany	o	o	xxx		5.45 m	q
10	Valters Kreišs	Latvia	-	xxo	xxx		5.45 m	
11	David Holý	Czech Republic	o	xxx			5.20 m	
—	Henri Apri	Estonia	xxx				NM	
—	Thibaut Collet	France	-	-	xxx		NM	

==== Group B ====
Place	Athlete	Nation	5.25	5.45	5.60	5.70	Result	Notes
1	Ylio Philtjens	Belgium	o	o	o		5.60 m	q
2	Mathieu Collet	France	-	o	xxo		5.60 m	q
3	Matteo Oliveri	Italy	xo	xo	xxo		5.60 m	q
4	Owen Heard	Great Britain & N.I.	o	o	xxx		5.45 m	q
4	Oleksandr Onufriyev	Ukraine	o	o	xxx		5.45 m	q
6	William Asker	Sweden	o	xo	xxx		5.45 m	
7	Robert Kompus	Estonia	xxo	xo	xxx		5.45 m	
8	Justin Fournier	Switzerland	xo	xxo	xxx		5.45 m	
9	Dan Bárta	Czech Republic	o	xxx			5.20 m	
10	Vladislav Malykhin	Ukraine	xo	xxx			5.20 m	
—	Ioannis Rizos	Greece	xxx				NM	
—	Ersu Şaşma	Turkey	-	xxx			NM	
—	Ivan Geronimo Šerić	Croatia	xxx				NM	
—	Menno Vloon	Netherlands	-	x-	-	xr	NM	

=== Final ===
The final was held on 16 August 2026, at 19:30 in the evening.

Place	Athlete	Nation	5.55	5.70	5.85	5.95	6.00	6.05	6.10	6.15	6.20	6.25	Result	Notes
1st place, gold medalist(s)	Armand Duplantis	Sweden	o	-	o	-	xo	-	o	o	-	r	6.15 m	CR
2nd place, silver medalist(s)	Emmanouil Karalis	Greece	o	-	o	o	xo	-	x-	x-	x		6.00 m	
3rd place, bronze medalist(s)	Baptiste Thiery	France	o	o	o	xxx							5.85 m	
4	Mathieu Collet	France	o	o	xxx								5.70 m	
5	Oleksandr Onufriyev	Ukraine	xo	o	xxx								5.70 m	=PB
6	Pedro Buaró	Portugal	o	xo	xxx								5.70 m	
6	Sondre Guttormsen	Norway	o	xo	xx-	x							5.70 m	
8	Ben Broeders	Belgium	xo	xo	xxx								5.70 m	
9	Bo Kanda Lita Baehre	Germany	o	xxo	x-	xx							5.70 m	
10	Ylio Philtjens	Belgium	xxo	xxo	xxx								5.70 m	=PB
11	Owen Heard	Great Britain & N.I.	o	xxx									5.55 m	
11	Gillian Ladwig	Germany	o	xxx									5.55 m	
13	Juho Alasaari	Finland	xo	xxx									5.55 m	
13	Matteo Oliveri	Italy	xo	xxx									5.55 m	
