= 2021 World Athletics U20 Championships – Men's pole vault =

Men's pole vault at the 2021 World Athletics U20 Championships
- Venue: Kasarani Stadium
- Dates: 20 August
- Competitors: 13 from 11 nations
- Winning height: 5.45 m

Medalists
gold medal	Matvei Volkov	Belarus
silver medal	Juho Alasaari	Finland
bronze medal	Kyle Rademeyer	South Africa

The men's pole vault at the 2021 World Athletics U20 Championships was held at the Kasarani Stadium on 20 August.

== Records ==
Standing records prior to the 2021 World Athletics U20 Championships
World U20 Record	Armand Duplantis (SWE)	6.05	Berlin, Germany	12 August 2018
Championship Record	Armand Duplantis (SWE)	5.82	Tampere, Finland	14 July 2018
World U20 Leading	Anthony Ammirati (FRA)	5.72	Salon-de-Provence, France	6 June 2021

== Results ==
=== Final ===
The final was held on 20 August at 10:05.

Rank	Name	Nationality	4.85	5.05	5.20	5.30	5.35	5.40	5.45	5.50	Mark	Notes
1st place, gold medalist(s)	Matvei Volkov	Belarus	–	–	–	o	–	–	xxo	–	5.45	
2nd place, silver medalist(s)	Juho Alasaari	Finland	–	o	o	–	xxo	–	xx-	x	5.35	
3rd place, bronze medalist(s)	Kyle Rademeyer	South Africa	–	–	o	o	–	xx-	x		5.30	
4	Oihan Etchegaray	France	o	o	o	xo	xxx				5.30	PB
5	Matteo Oliveri	Italy	–	o	xo	xxx					5.20	PB
5	Nikita Strohalyev	Ukraine	o	o	xo	xxx					5.20	PB
7	Aleksandr Solovyov	Authorised Neutral Athletes	o	o	xxx						5.05	
8	Marcell Nagy	Hungary	o	xxx							4.85	
9	Ameer Falih Abdulwahid	Iraq	xo	xxx							4.85	
10	Sedat Cacim	Turkey	xxo	xxx							4.85	
	Anthony Ammirati	France	–	–	–	xxx					NM	
	Sotirios Chytas	Greece	xxx								NM	
	Oleksandr Onufriyev	Ukraine	xxx								NM	
