= 2022 World Athletics U20 Championships – Men's pole vault =

Men's pole vault at the 2022 World Athletics U20 Championships
- Venue: Estadio Olímpico Pascual Guerrero
- Dates: 2 August (qualification); 4 August (final)
- Competitors: 24 from 18 nations
- Winning height: 5.75

Medalists
gold medal	Anthony Ammirati	France
silver medal	Juho Alasaari	Finland
bronze medal	Michał Gawenda	Poland

The men's pole vault at the 2022 World Athletics U20 Championships was held at the Estadio Olímpico Pascual Guerrero on 2 and 4 August.

== Records ==
U20 standing records prior to the 2022 World Athletics U20 Championships were as follows:

Record	Athlete & Nationality	Mark	Location	Date
World U20 Record	Armand Duplantis (SWE)	6.05	Berlin, Germany	12 August 2018
Championship Record	Armand Duplantis (SWE)	5.82	Tampere, Finland	14 July 2018
World U20 Leading	Anthony Ammirati (FRA)	5.70	Caen, France	26 June 2022

== Results ==
=== Qualification ===
The qualification round took place on 2 August, in two groups, both starting at 9:00 Athletes attaining a mark of at least 5.35 metres ( Q ) or at least the 12 best performers ( q ) qualified for the final.

Rank	Group	Name	Nationality	4.60	4.75	4.90	5.05	5.20	Mark	Notes
1	A	Ander Martinez de Rituerto	Spain	–	–	o	o	o	5.20	q, PB
1	B	Anthony Ammirati	France	–	–	–	–	o	5.20	q
1	B	Austin Ramos	Ecuador	–	o	o	o	o	5.20	q
1	A	Garrett Brown	United States	–	o	o	o	o	5.20	q
1	A	Juho Alasaari	Finland	–	–	–	o	o	5.20	q
6	B	Atsushi Haraguchi	Japan	–	–	–	xo	o	5.20	q
7	B	Michał Gawenda	Poland	–	–	–	o	xxo	5.20	q
8	B	Marec Metzger	Germany	–	o	o	xo	xxo	5.20	q
9	A	Till Marburger	Germany	–	o	xo	o	xxx	5.05	q
9	B	Justin Rogers	United States	–	o	xo	o	xxx	5.05	q
11	A	Sloan Petiphar	France	–	–	–	xo	xxx	5.05	q
12	A	József Bánovics	Hungary	o	o	xo	xxo	xxx	5.05	q
12	B	Pierre Straet	Belgium	xo	o	o	xxo	xxx	5.05	q
14	B	Juan Luis Bravo Recio	Spain	o	xxo	o	xxo	xxx	5.05	
15	A	Lazarus Benjamin	Great Britain	–	–	o	xxx		4.90	
15	A	Simone Bertelli	Italy	–	–	o	xxx		4.90	
15	A	Tsubasa Mizutani	Japan	–	–	o	xxx		4.90	
18	B	Liam Georgilopoulos	Australia	–	xo	o	xxx		4.90	
19	A	Alexander Auer	Austria	–	o	xxx			4.75	
19	B	Josué Daniel García	Mexico	–	o	xxx			4.75	
	B	Federico Bonanni	Italy	–	xxx				NM	
	B	Miguel Ángel Cervantes	Colombia	xxx					NM	
	A	Philip Andreas Kubon	Norway	–	xxx				NM	
	B	William Asker	Sweden	–	xxx				NM	
	A	Ricardo Montes de Oca	Venezuela	DNS						

=== Final ===
The final was held on 4 August at 15:07.

Rank	Name	Nationality	4.90	5.05	5.15	5.25	5.35	5.40	5.45	5.50	5.55	5.60	5.65	5.70	5.75	5.83	Mark	Notes
1st place, gold medalist(s)	Anthony Ammirati	France	–	–	–	–	o	–	o	–	o	–	o	x–	o	xxx	5.75	WU20L
2nd place, silver medalist(s)	Juho Alasaari	Finland	–	–	o	–	xo	–	–	o	–	o	x–	xx			5.60	NU20R
3rd place, bronze medalist(s)	Michał Gawenda	Poland	–	o	–	o	o	x–	o	x–	xx						5.45	PB
4	Garrett Brown	United States	o	xo	xo	o	xxx										5.25	
5	Ander Martinez de Rituerto	Spain	xo	o	o	xo	xx–	x									5.25	PB
6	Till Marburger	Germany	xxo	o	o	xxx											5.15	
7	Atsushi Haraguchi	Japan	–	–	xo	–	xxx										5.15	
8	Austin Ramos	Ecuador	xo	o	xo	xxx											5.15	
9	Marec Metzger	Germany	o	xxo	xo	xxx											5.15	
9	Justin Rogers	United States	o	xxo	xo	xxx											5.15	
11	József Bánovics	Hungary	xo	xxo	xxo	xxx											5.15	PB
12	Sloan Petiphar	France	–	xxo	–	xxx											5.05	
13	Pierre Straet	Belgium	o	xxx													4.90	
