= Athletics at the 2025 Summer World University Games – Men's pole vault =

Men's pole vault at the 2025 Summer World University Games
- Venue: Lohrheidestadion
- Location: Bochum, Germany
- Dates: 25 July (qualification); 27 July (final)
- Winning height: 5.75 m PB

Medalists
gold medal	Simen Guttormsen	Norway
silver medal	Valters Kreiss	Latvia
bronze medal	Márton Böndör	Hungary

The men's pole vault event at the 2025 Summer World University Games was held in Bochum, Germany, at Lohrheidestadion on 25 and 27 July.

== Records ==
Prior to the competition, the records were as follows:

Record	Athlete (nation)	Distance (m)	Location	Date
Games record	István Bagyula (HUN)	5.80 m	Sheffield, United Kingdom	21 July 1991

== Results ==
=== Qualification ===
All athletes over 5.55 m (Q) or at least the 12 best performers (q) advance to the final.

==== Group A ====
Place	Athlete	Nation	4.85	5.05	5.25	5.40	Result	Notes
1	Márton Böndör	Hungary	-	o	o	o	5.40 m	q
1	Matteo Oliveri	Italy	-	o	o	o	5.40 m	q
3	Filip Kempski	Poland	-	o	xo	o	5.40 m	q
4	Valters Kreišs	Latvia	-	-	xxo	o	5.40 m	q
5	Dev Meena	India	-	o	o	xo	5.40 m	q, PB, NR
6	Felix Eichenberger	Switzerland	-	o	xo	xo	5.40 m	q, =SB
7	Valko van Wyk	South Africa	-	xo	xxo	xo	5.40 m	q, =SB
8	Maddox Hamm	United States	-	o	o	xxx	5.25 m	q
9	Illia Bobrovnyk	Ukraine	-	xxo	o	xxx	5.25 m	
10	Robert Kompus	Estonia	-	-	xxo	xxx	5.25 m	
11	Mark Mellor	Great Britain	o	o	xxx		5.05 m	
11	Ben Conacher	Australia	-	o	xxx		5.05 m	
13	Tsung-Hsien Lin	Chinese Taipei	-	xo	xxx		5.05 m	
14	Adam Antalec	Slovakia	o	xxx			4.85 m	
15	Ivan Paravac	Croatia	xo	xxx			4.85 m	
—	Arian Milicija	Bosnia and Herzegovina	xxx				NM	

==== Group B ====
Place	Athlete	Nation	4.85	5.05	5.25	5.40	Result	Notes
1	Artur Coll	Spain	-	o	o	o	5.40 m	q
2	Aiden Princena-White	Australia	-	o	o	xo	5.40 m	q
2	Simen Guttormsen	Norway	-	-	o	xo	5.40 m	q
4	Atsushi Haraguchi	Japan	-	o	o	xxx	5.25 m	q
5	Owen Heard	Great Britain	-	xo	o	xxx	5.25 m	
6	Carlos Pitra	Portugal	-	o	xo	xxx	5.25 m	
7	Yong-Fu Huang	Chinese Taipei	xo	xo	xo	xxx	5.25 m	
8	Justin Fournier	Switzerland	xo	o	xxo	xxx	5.25 m	
9	Bartosz Marciniewicz	Poland	-	o	xxx		5.05 m	
9	Conner McClure	United States	-	o	xxx		5.05 m	
11	Muhammad Naufal Bin Shahrul	Malaysia	xxo	o	xxx		5.05 m	
12	Erdem Tilki	Turkey	o	xxo	xxx		5.05 m	
13	Low Jun Yu	Singapore	xo	xxo	xxx		5.05 m	
14	G. Reegan	India	xxo	xxx			4.85 m	
—	Marcell Nagy	Hungary	xxx				NM	

=== Final ===
Place	Athlete	Nation	5.05	5.25	5.35	5.45	5.50	5.55	5.60	5.65	5.70	5.75	5.80	5.85	Result	Notes
1st place, gold medalist(s)	Simen Guttormsen	Norway	-	-	o	-	o	o	o	o	-	xxo	xxx		5.75 m	PB
2nd place, silver medalist(s)	Valters Kreišs	Latvia	-	xo	-	xxo	-	o	-	o	-	xx-	-	x	5.65 m	
3rd place, bronze medalist(s)	Márton Böndör	Hungary	o	o	o	o	-	o	x-	x-	x				5.55 m	
4	Matteo Oliveri	Italy	-	o	-	xo	-	xxx							5.45 m	
5	Dev Meena	India	xxo	o	xo	xxx									5.35 m	
6	Aiden Princena-White	Australia	o	xo	xxo	xxx									5.35 m	
7	Felix Eichenberger	Switzerland	xo	o	xxx										5.25 m	
8	Filip Kempski	Poland	-	xo	-	xxx									5.25 m	
—	Artur Coll	Spain	-	xxx											NM	
—	Valko van Wyk	South Africa	-	xxx											NM	
—	Maddox Hamm	United States	-	xxx											NM	
—	Atsushi Haraguchi	Japan	-	xxx											NM	
