= 2025 European Athletics U23 Championships – Men's pole vault =

Men's pole vault at the 2025 European Athletics U23 Championships
- Venue: Fana Stadion
- Location: Bergen, Norway
- Dates: 17 July (qualification); 19 July (final)
- Competitors: 34 from 21 nations
- Winning height: 5.70 m PB

Medalists
gold medal	Simone Bertelli	Italy
silver medal	Tristan Despres	France
bronze medal	Valters Kreišs	Latvia

The men's pole vault event at the 2025 European Athletics U23 Championships was held in Bergen, Norway, at Fana Stadion on 17 and 19 July.

== Records ==
Prior to the competition, the records were as follows:

Record	Athlete (nation)	Height (m)	Location	Date
European U23 record	Armand Duplantis (SWE)	6.18 m	Glasgow, Scotland	15 February 2020
Championship U23 record	Romain Mesnil (FRA)	5.93 m	Gothenburg, Sweden	1 August 1999

== Results ==
=== Qualification ===
All athletes over 5.50 m (Q) or at least the 12 best performers (q) advance to the final.

==== Group A ====
Place	Athlete	Nation	5.00	5.15	5.30	Result	Notes
1	Juho Alasaari	Finland	–	–	o	5.30	q
1	Alexander Auer	Germany	o	o	o	5.30	q
1	Valters Kreišs	Latvia	–	–	o	5.30	q
4	Ismaila Sawaneh	France	–	o	xo	5.30	q
5	Justin Fournier	Switzerland	xo	o	xxo	5.30	q
6	Georgios Papanastasiou	Greece	o	xxo	xxo	5.30	q
6	Jak Rovan	Slovenia	xo	xo	xxo	5.30	q, PB
8	Rodrigo Alcobia	Portugal	o	o	xxx	5.15	
8	Robert Kompus	Estonia	–	o	xxx	5.15	
8	Valentyn Loboda	Ukraine	o	o	xxx	5.15	
11	Mario Hajzler	Czech Republic	o	xo	xxx	5.15	
12	Federico Bonanni	Italy	xo	xxx		5.00	
12	Martí Serra	Spain	xo	xxx		5.00	
—	Teodor Borgius	Sweden	xxx			NM	
—	Juan Luis Bravo	Spain	–	xxx		NM	
—	Philip Andreas Kubon	Norway	xxx			NM	
—	Arian Milicija	Bosnia and Herzegovina	xxx			NM	

==== Group B ====
Place	Athlete	Nation	5.00	5.15	5.30	Result	Notes
1	Simone Bertelli	Italy	–	–	o	5.30	q
1	Tristan Despres	France	–	–	o	5.30	q
3	Ladislav Sedláček	Czech Republic	o	xo	o	5.30	q
4	Anthony Ammirati	France	–	–	xo	5.30	q
5	Illia Bobrovnyk	Ukraine	xxo	o	xo	5.30	q
6	Hendrik Müller	Germany	xo	o	xxx	5.15	
6	Luka Zupanc	Slovenia	xo	o	xxx	5.15	
8	Dimitris Christofi	Cyprus	o	xxo	xxx	5.15	
8	Ander Martinez de Rituerto	Spain	o	xxo	xxx	5.15	
10	Oskari Henttinen	Finland	o	xxx		5.00	
10	Nikodemas Laurynas	Lithuania	o	xxx		5.00	
10	Erdem Tilki	Turkey	o	xxx		5.00	
13	Andrea Demontis	Italy	xo	xxx		5.00	
13	Nikodem Pochopień	Poland	xo	xxx		5.00	
15	William Asker	Sweden	xxo	xxx		5.00	
15	Linus Jönsson	Sweden	xxo	–	xxx	5.00	
—	Julius Haansbæk Mortensen	Denmark	xxx			NM	

=== Final ===
Place	Athlete	Nation	5.10	5.30	5.45	5.60	5.70	5.76	Result	Notes
1st place, gold medalist(s)	Simone Bertelli	Italy	-	o	xo	o	xxo	xxx	5.70 m	PB
2nd place, silver medalist(s)	Tristan Despres	France	-	-	o	o	xxx		5.60 m	
3rd place, bronze medalist(s)	Valters Kreišs	Latvia	-	xxo	xo	o	xxx		5.60 m	
4	Anthony Ammirati	France	-	o	xxo	xo	xxx		5.60 m	
5	Justin Fournier	Switzerland	o	xxo	o	xxx			5.45 m	PB
6	Ismaila Sawaneh	France	-	o	xxo	xxx			5.45 m	
7	Georgios Papanastasiou	Greece	-	o	xxx				5.30 m	
7	Juho Alasaari	Finland	o	o	xxx				5.30 m	
7	Alexander Auer	Austria	o	o	xxx				5.30 m	
10	Ladislav Sedláček	Czech Republic	o	xo	xxx				5.30 m	
11	Illia Bobrovnyk	Ukraine	o	xxx					5.10 m	
12	Jak Rovan	Slovenia	xo	xxx					5.10 m	
