= Thomas Walley (pole vaulter) =

Welsh athlete (born 1998)

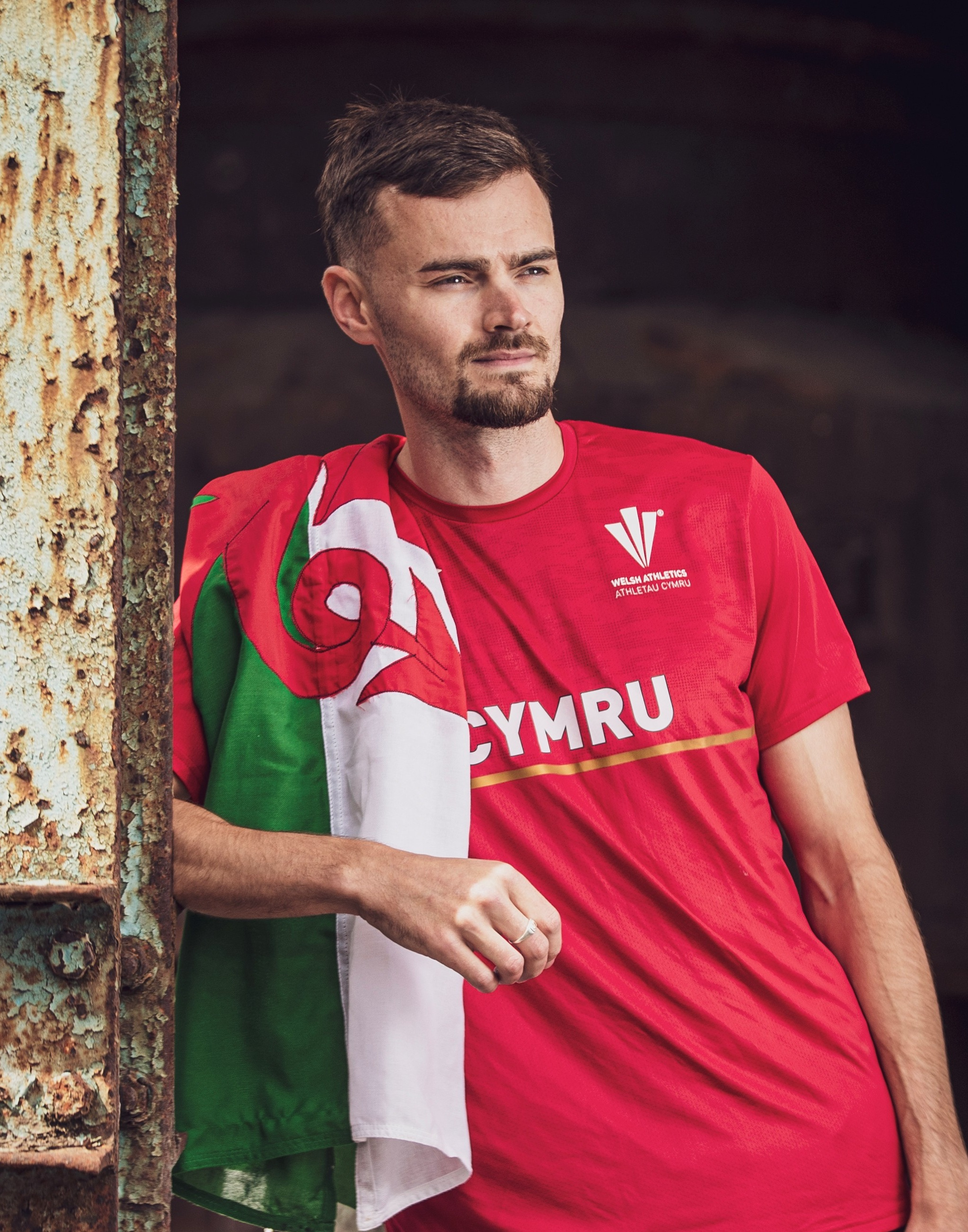

Personal information
- Nationality: British (Welsh)
- Born: 18 March 1998 (age 28)

Sport
- Sport: Athletics
- Event: Pole Vault

Achievements and titles
- Personal bests: Pole Vault: 5.35m (Manchester, 2026)

Thomas Walley (born 18 March 1998) is a British pole vaulter from Wales.

== Biography ==
From Wrexham, and a member of Wrexham AAC, Walley initially competed as a multi-event athlete before specialising in the pole vault.

Walley won the pole vault at the 2025 England Athletics Championships in July 2025. The following month, he placed third behind Owen Heard and Adam Hague at the 2025 British Athletics Championships.

On 14 February, he placed third overall at the 2026 British Indoor Championships behind Owen Heard and Jax Thoirs, with 5.25 metres. Competing in the United States in April, Walley cleared a personal best 5.30 metres to win the Rafer Johnson/JJK Invitational Meeting at UCLA. Walley set another new personal best clearance of 5.35 metres in Manchester in May 2026. In June, he was runner-up to Heard at the 2026 UK Athletics Championships, clearing 5.30 metres.

Walley was selected as part of the Welsh team, and placed fifth overall, in the pole vault at the 2026 Commonwealth Games in Glasgow, Scotland.
