= Ukraine at the 2026 European Athletics Championships =

- Flag of Ukraine
- WA code: UKR

in Birmingham, United Kingdom 10–16 August 2026
- Competitors: 25 (15 men and 10 women)
- Medals Ranked 11th: Gold 1 Silver 1 Bronze 2 Total 4

European Athletics Championships appearances
- 1994; 1998; 2002; 2006; 2010; 2012; 2014; 2016; 2018; 2022; 2024; 2026

Other related appearances
- Soviet Union (1946–1990)

Ukraine competed at the 2026 European Athletics Championships in Birmingham, United Kingdom from 10–16 August 2026.

== Medallists ==
| Medal | Name | Event | Date |
|---|---|---|---|
| Gold | Yaroslava Mahuchikh | Women's high jump | 15 August |
| Silver | Oleh Doroshchuk | Men's high jump | 14 August |
| Bronze | Mykhaylo Kokhan | Men's hammer throw | 11 August |
| Bronze | Lyudmyla Olyanovska | Women's marathon race walk | 15 August |

== Results ==
Ukraine entered the following athletes.

Key

- Q = Qualified for the next round
- q = Qualified for the next round as a fastest loser or, in field events, by position without achieving the qualifying target
- NR = National record
- PB = Personal best
- SB = Season best
- N/A = Round not applicable for the event

=== Men ===
Track and road events

| Athlete | Event | Heat | | Semifinal | | Final | |
| Athlete | Event | Result | Rank | Result | Rank | Result | Rank |
|---|---|---|---|---|---|---|---|
| Oleksandr Pohorilko | 400 m | 46.55 | 20 | Did not advance | | | |
| Dmytro Bahinskyi | 110 m hurdles | 13.80 | 6 q | DNF | | Did not advance | |
| Oleh Kukota | 110 m hurdles | 14.02 | 14 | Did not advance | | | |
| Roman Horbachov | Half marathon walk | —N/a | | | | 1:33:44 | 23 |
| Mukola Rushchak | Half marathon walk | —N/a | | | | 1:24:12 | 4 |
| Ivan Banzeruk | Marathon walk | —N/a | | | | 3:18:30 | 22 |
| Serhii Svitlychnyi | Marathon walk | —N/a | | | | 3:05:56 | 12 |
| Maryan Zakalnytskyy | Marathon walk | —N/a | | | | 3:04:38 | 10 |

Field events

| Athlete | Event | Qualification | | Final | |
| Athlete | Event | Distance | Position | Distance | Position |
|---|---|---|---|---|---|
| Oleh Doroshchuk | High jump | 2.23 | 5 q | 2.30 | 2nd place, silver medalist(s) |
| Dmytro Nikitin | High jump | 2.15 | 17 | Did not advance | |
| Roman Petruk | High jump | 2.10 | 20 | Did not advance | |
| Vladislav Malykhin | Pole vault | 5.25 | 21 | Did not advance | |
| Oleksandr Onufriyev | Pole vault | 5.45 | 12 q | 5.70 | 5 |
| Mykhaylo Kokhan | Hammer throw | 77.40 | 4 q | 79.49 | 3rd place, bronze medalist(s) |
| Artur Felfner | Javelin throw | 76.37 | 22 | Did not advance | |

=== Women ===
Track and road events

| Athlete | Event | Heat | | Semifinal | | Final | |
| Athlete | Event | Result | Rank | Result | Rank | Result | Rank |
|---|---|---|---|---|---|---|---|
| Alina Kyshkina | 400 m hurdles | 56.12 | 9 q | DNF | | Did not advance | |
| Viktoriya Tkachuk | 400 m hurdles | 55.60 | 4 q | 54.95 SB | 4 | Did not advance | |
| Lyudmyla Olyanovska | Half marathon walk | —N/a | | | | 1:31:07 | 3rd place, bronze medalist(s) |
| Mariia Sakharuk | Half marathon walk | —N/a | | | | 1:34:28 | 8 |
| Hanna Shevchuk | Marathon walk | —N/a | | | | 3:26:02 | 6 |

Field events

| Athlete | Event | Qualification | | Final | |
| Athlete | Event | Distance | Position | Distance | Position |
|---|---|---|---|---|---|
| Iryna Herashchenko | High jump | 1.91 | 1 Q | 1.92 | 5 |
| Yaroslava Mahuchikh | High jump | 1.91 | 1 Q | 1.97 | 1st place, gold medalist(s) |
| Maryna Kylypko | Pole vault | 4.25 | 24 | Did not advance | |
| Iryna Budzynska | Long jump | NM | | Did not advance | |
| Iryna Klymets | Hammer throw | 67.38 | 15 | Did not advance | |
