= 2021 European Athletics U23 Championships – Men's pole vault =

Men's pole vault at the 2021 European Athletics U23 Championships
- Venue: Kadriorg Stadium, Tallinn
- Dates: 8 and 10 July
- Competitors: 19 from 11 nations
- Winning mark: 5.80

Medalists
gold medal	Ethan Cormont	France
silver medal	Emmanouil Karalis	Greece
bronze medal	Sondre Guttormsen	Norway
bronze medal	Ersu Şaşma	Turkey

The men's pole vault event at the 2021 European Athletics U23 Championships was held in Tallinn, Estonia, at Kadriorg Stadium on 8 and 10 July.

== Records ==
Prior to the competition, the records were as follows:

European U23 record	Armand Duplantis (SWE)	6.18	Glasgow, Great Britain	15 February 2020
Championship U23 record	Romain Mesnil (FRA)	5.93	Gothenburg, Sweden	1 August 1999

== Results ==
=== Qualification ===
Qualification rule: 5.45 (Q) or the 12 best results (q) qualified for the final.

Rank	Group	Name	Nationality	4.90	5.05	5.20	5.35	Results	Notes
1	B	Ethan Cormont	France	–	–	–	o	5.35	q
1	A	Sondre Guttormsen	Norway	–	–	o	o	5.35	q
1	B	Eerik Haamer	Estonia	–	o	o	o	5.35	q
1	A	Emmanouil Karalis	Greece	–	–	o	o	5.35	q
1	A	Pål Haugen Lillefosse	Norway	–	–	o	o	5.35	q
1	B	Ersu Şaşma	Turkey	–	–	–	o	5.35	q
7	A	Thibaut Collet	France	–	–	–	xo	5.35	q
8	B	Riccardo Klotz	Austria	–	o	o	x	5.20	q
9	A	Illya Kravchenko	Ukraine	–	x–	o	xxx	5.20	q
10	B	Carlos Pitra	Portugal	o	o	xo	x	5.20	q
11	B	Alex Gracia	Spain	xo	xo	xo	x	5.20	q
12	B	Ioannis Rizos	Greece	o	xo	xxo	x	5.20	q
13	A	Ivan De Angelis	Italy	–	o	xxx		5.05	
14	B	Artur Bortnikov	Ukraine	x	xo	xxx		5.05	SB
15	A	Felix Eichenberger	Switzerland	xo	xxx			4.90	
16	B	Andrea Marin	Italy	xxo	xxx			4.90	
	A	Nicolò Fusaro	Italy	xxx				NM	
	B	Simen Guttormsen	Norway	–	–	xxx		NM	
	A	Antonios Santas	Greece	xxx				NM	

=== Final ===
Rank	Name	Nationality	5.00	5.20	5.30	5.40	5.50	5.60	5.65	5.70	5.75	5.80	5.85	Result	Notes
1st place, gold medalist(s)	Ethan Cormont	France	–	–	o	–	o	o	–	xxo	o	o	r	5.80	=PB
2nd place, silver medalist(s)	Emmanouil Karalis	Greece	–	–	o	–	o	–	xo	–	x–	xx		5.65	
3rd place, bronze medalist(s)	Sondre Guttormsen	Norway	–	–	–	o	–	o	–	x–	x–	x		5.60	
3rd place, bronze medalist(s)	Ersu Şaşma	Turkey	–	–	–	–	o	o	–	xxx				5.60	
5	Pål Haugen Lillefosse	Norway	–	–	–	xo	o	o	xxx					5.60	=SB
6	Thibaut Collet	France	–	–	o	–	o	xxx						5.50	
7	Eerik Haamer	Estonia	–	o	o	o	xo	xxx						5.50	
8	Alex Gracia	Spain	o	o	xxo	xxo	xxx							5.40	
9	Carlos Pitra	Portugal	o	xxo	xo	xxx								5.30	PB
10	Ioannis Rizos	Greece	xxo	o	xxx									5.20	
11	Riccardo Klotz	Austria	xo	xxx										5.00	
	Illya Kravchenko	Ukraine	–	xxx										NM	
