= 2024 World Athletics U20 Championships – Men's pole vault =

Men's pole vault at the 2024 World Athletics U20 Championships
- Venue: Estadio Atlético de la VIDENA
- Dates: 28 August 2024 (qualification); 30 August 2024 (final)
- Competitors: 30 from 21 nations
- Winning height: 5.45 m

Medalists
gold medal	Hendrik Müller	Germany
silver medal	Rikuya Yoshida	Japan
bronze medal	Jan Krček	Czech Republic

The men's pole vault at the 2024 World Athletics U20 Championships was held at the Estadio Atlético de la VIDENA in Lima, Peru on 28 and 30 August 2024.

== Records ==
U20 standing records prior to the 2022 World Athletics U20 Championships were as follows:

Record	Athlete & Nationality	Mark	Location	Date
World U20 Record	Armand Duplantis (SWE)	6.05	Berlin, Germany	12 August 2018
Championship Record	Armand Duplantis (SWE)	5.82	Tampere, Finland	14 July 2018
World U20 Leading	Seifeldin Heneida Abdesalam (QAT)	5.55	Tehran, Iran	18 February 2024
World U20 Leading	Hendrik Müller (GER)	5.55	Dortmund, Germany	24 February 2024

== Results ==
=== Qualification ===
The qualification round took place on 27 August, in two groups, with both scheduled to start at 16:00. Athletes attaining a mark of at least 5.30 metres (Q) or at least the 12 best performers (q) qualified for the final.

==== Group A ====
Rank	Athlete	Nation	4.60	4.80	4.95	5.10	5.25	5.30	Mark	Notes
1	Jan Krček	Czech Republic	–	o	o	o	o		5.25	q
2	Ricardo Montes de Oca	Venezuela	–	–	–	o	xo		5.25	q, SB
3	Augustin Becquet Perigon	France	–	–	xo	o	xxo		5.25	q
4	Hendrik Müller	Germany	–	–	o	o	xxx		5.10	q
5	Bryce Barkdull	United States	–	xo	o	o	xxx		5.10	q
5	Rikuya Yoshida	Japan	–	xo	o	o	xxx		5.10	q
7	Seif Heneida	Qatar	–	–	–	xo	xxx		5.10	q
7	Linus Jönsson	Sweden	–	–	o	xo	xx–		5.10	q
9	Ylio Philtjens	Belgium	–	–	xo	xxo	xxx		5.10	
9	Adria Ripolles	Spain	–	o	xo	xxo	xxx		5.10	
11	Illia Bobrovnyk	Ukraine	–	o	o	xxx			4.95	
11	Robert Kompus	Estonia	–	o	o	xxx			4.95	
11	William Lane	Great Britain	o	o	o	xxx			4.95	
14	Brenden Vanderpool	Bahamas	xxo	xo	xxx				4.80	
15	Maj Bizjak	Slovenia	xo	xxx					4.60	
–	Valentin Imsand	Switzerland							DNS	

==== Group B ====
Rank	Athlete	Nation	4.60	4.80	4.95	5.10	5.25	5.30	Mark	Notes
1	Gabin Mathe	France	–	–	o	o	xo		5.25	q
2	Victor Olesen	United States	xo	o	xo	o	xxx		5.10	q
3	Andrea Demontis	Italy	–	o	o	xo	xxx		5.10	q
4	Ryota Murakoso	Japan	–	o	xo	xo	xxx		5.10	q
5	Viktor Rahm	Sweden	–	o	o	xxo	xxx		5.10	
6	Arian Milcija	Bosnia and Herzegovina	o	o	xo	xxo	xxx		5.10	
7	Justin Fournier	Switzerland	–	xo	xxo	xxo	xxx		5.10	
8	Ladislav Sedláček	Czech Republic	–	xo	o	xxx			4.95	
9	Dev Meena	India	–	–	xo	xxx			4.95	
10	Tamer Ashraf Mohamed	Egypt	–	o	xxx				4.80	
10	Dimitris Christofi	Cyprus	o	o	xxx				4.80	
12	Martí Serra	Spain	o	xo	xxr				4.80	
13	Joshua Stallbaum	Germany	xo	xxx					4.60	
14	Jak Rovan	Slovenia	xxo	xxx					4.60	
–	Karl Pohlak	Estonia	xxx						NM	
–	Pavlos Kriaras	Greece							DNS	

=== Final ===
Rank	Athlete	Nation	4.85	5.05	5.20	5.30	5.35	5.40	5.45	Mark	Notes
1st place, gold medalist(s)	Hendrik Müller	Germany	–	o	xxo	xxo	xo	o	xxo	5.45	
2nd place, silver medalist(s)	Rikuya Yoshida	Japan	o	xxo	o	xo	o	o	xxx	5.40	PB
3rd place, bronze medalist(s)	Jan Krček	Czech Republic	o	xo	o	o				5.30	PB
4	Ryota Murakoso	Japan	o	o	xxo	xxx				5.20	SB
5	Bryce Barkdull	United States	xo	xxo	xxo	xxx				5.20	
6	Augustin Becquet Perigon	France	–	o	xxx					5.05	
6	Seif Heneida	Qatar	–	o	xxx					5.05	
6	Victor Olesen	United States	o	o	xxx					5.05	
9	Andrea Demontis	Italy	xo	o	xxx					5.05	
10	Gabin Mathe	France	–	o	xxx					5.05	
–	Ricardo Montes de Oca	Venezuela	–	–	xxx					NM	
–	Linus Jönsson	Sweden								DNS	
