= Athletics at the 2018 Summer Youth Olympics – Boys' pole vault =

Athletics event

Boys' pole vault at the III Summer Youth Olympic Games
- Venue: Parque Polideportivo Roca
- Date: 13, 16 October
- Competitors: 14 from 14 nations

Medalists
1st place, gold medalist(s)		Baptiste Thiery	France
2nd place, silver medalist(s)		Kazuki Furusawa	Japan
3rd place, bronze medalist(s)		Dmitriy Kachanov	Russia

The boys' pole vault competition at the 2018 Summer Youth Olympics was held on 13 and 16 October, at the Parque Polideportivo Roca.

== Schedule ==
All times are in local time (UTC-3).

Date	Time	Round
Saturday, 13 October 2018	14:40	Stage 1
Tuesday, 16 October 2018	14:00	Stage 2

== Results ==
=== Stage 1 ===
Rank	Athlete	Nationality	4.35	4.45	4.55	4.65	4.75	4.85	4.95	5.05	5.10	5.15	5.20	5.25	5.30	Result	Notes
1	Dmitriy Kachanov	Russia	–	–	–	–	–	o	o	o	–	o	xo	x-	xx	5.20	
2	Eerik Haamer	Estonia	–	–	o	–	o	o	o	o	xo	xo	xxx			5.15	PB
3	Kazuki Furusawa	Japan	–	–	–	o	o	o	o	o	o	xxx				5.10	PB
4	Baptiste Thiery	France	–	–	–	–	–	xo	xo	xo	–	xxx				5.05	
5	Nikolai van Huyssteen	South Africa	–	o	o	o	o	xo	o	xxx						4.95	
6	Pedro Buaró	Portugal	–	–	–	o	xo	xxo	xxx							4.85	
7	Antonios Santas	Greece	–	–	o	o	xxo	xxo	xxx							4.85	
8	Artur Coll	Spain	–	–	xo	xxo	o	xxx								4.75	
9	Ivan De Angelis	Italy	o	–	xo	–	xo	xxx								4.75	
10	Felix Eichenberger	Switzerland	xo	o	xo	xxx										4.55	
11	Adam Mihály	Hungary	–	o	xxx											4.45	
12	Yang Wei-yuan	Chinese Taipei	xxo	o	xxx											4.45	
13	Amal Hasanov	Israel	–	xo	–	xxx										4.45	
	Pablo Zaffaroni	Argentina	–	–	–	–	xxx									NM	
	Thulfiqar Al-Taie	Iraq														DNS	

=== Stage 2 ===
Rank	Athlete	Nationality	4.32	4.42	4.52	4.62	4.72	4.82	4.92	5.02	5.07	5.12	5.17	5.22	5.27	5.32	5.41	Result	Notes
1	Baptiste Thiery	France	–	–	–	–	–	o	o	–	o	–	xo	o	o	xxo	xxx	5.32	PB
2	Kazuki Furusawa	Japan	–	–	–	o	o	o	xo	xo	o	o	xo	xo	xxx			5.22	PB
3	Dmitriy Kachanov	Russia	–	–	–	–	–	o	o	o	–	o	xxx					5.12	
4	Eerik Haamer	Estonia	–	–	xo	–	o	–	o	xo	xxo	xo	xxx					5.12	
5	Pablo Zaffaroni	Argentina	–	–	–	o	–	xxo	o	xxx								4.92	
6	Antonios Santas	Greece	–	–	o	o	xo	o	xxx									4.82	
7	Pedro Buaró	Portugal	–	–	o	xo	o	xo	xxx									4.82	
8	Ivan De Angelis	Italy	–	xo	–	xo	o	xo	xxx									4.82	
9	Adam Mihály	Hungary	–	xo	o	o	xxo	xo	xxx									4.82	
10	Nikolai van Huyssteen	South Africa	–	–	o	o	xo	xxx										4.72	
11	Artur Coll	Spain	–	–	xo	–	xo	xxx										4.72	
12	Felix Eichenberger	Switzerland	o	xxo	xo	o	xxx											4.62	
13	Yang Wei-yuan	Chinese Taipei	o	o	o	xo	xxx											4.62	PB
14	Amal Hasanov	Israel	xo	o	xo	xxo	xxx											4.62	
	Thulfiqar Al-Taie	Iraq																DNS	

=== Final placing ===
Rank	Athlete	Nation	Stage 1	Stage 2	Total
1st place, gold medalist(s)	Baptiste Thiery	France	5.05	5.32	10.37
2nd place, silver medalist(s)	Kazuki Furusawa	Japan	5.10	5.22	10.32
3rd place, bronze medalist(s)	Dmitriy Kachanov	Russia	5.20	5.12	10.32
4	Eerik Haamer	Estonia	5.15	5.12	10.27
5	Nikolai van Huyssteen	South Africa	4.95	4.72	9.67
6	Pedro Buaró	Portugal	4.85	4.82	9.67
6	Antonios Santas	Greece	4.85	4.82	9.67
8	Ivan De Angelis	Italy	4.75	4.82	9.57
9	Artur Coll	Spain	4.75	4.72	9.47
10	Adam Mihály	Hungary	4.45	4.82	9.27
11	Felix Eichenberger	Switzerland	4.55	4.62	9.17
12	Amal Hasanov	Israel	4.45	4.62	9.07
12	Yang Wei-yuan	Chinese Taipei	4.45	4.62	9.07
14	Pablo Zaffaroni	Argentina	NM	4.92	4.92
	Thulfiqar Al-Taie	Iraq	DNS	DNS	
