= Athletics at the 2024 BRICS Games =

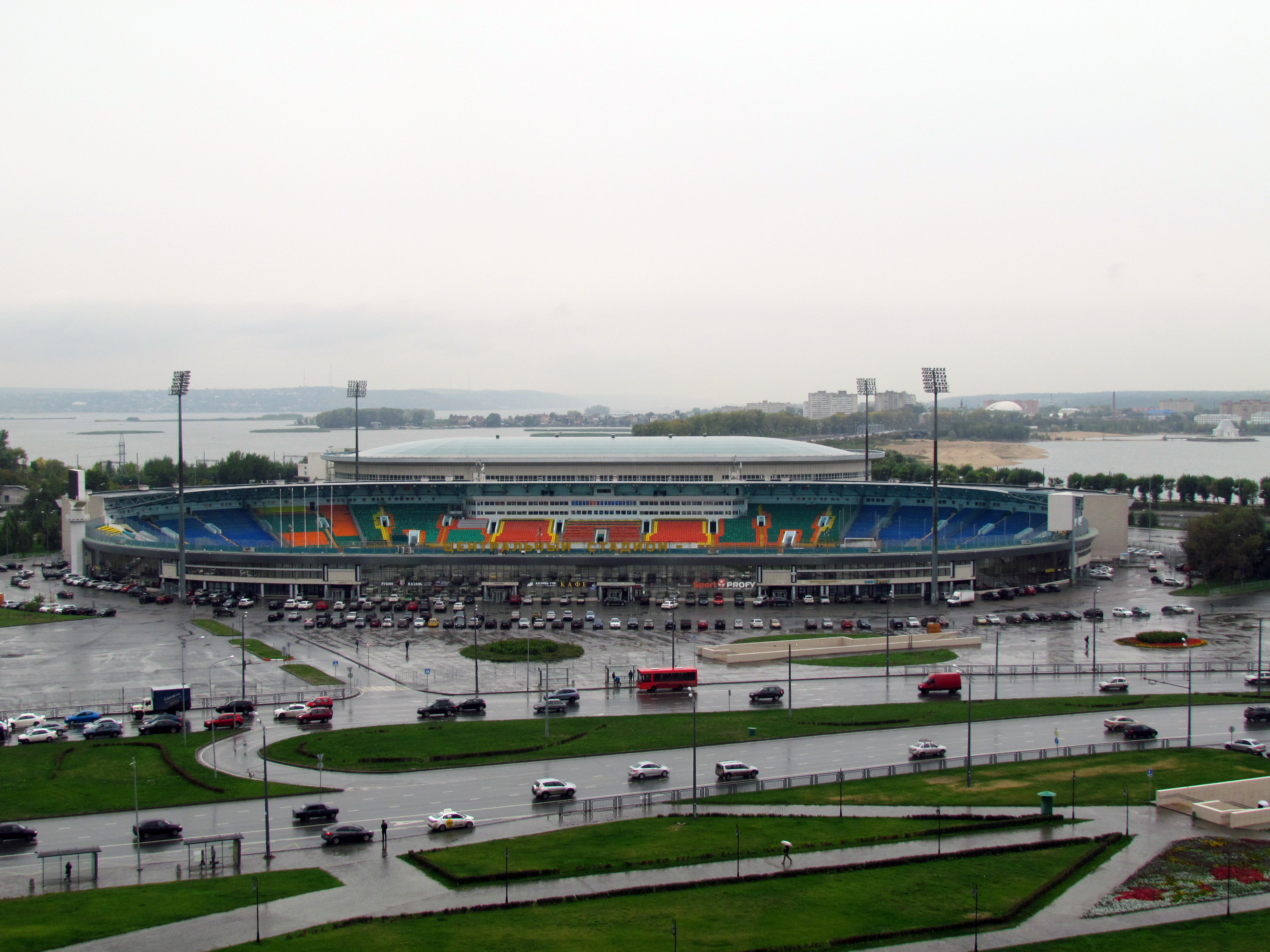
- Dates: 14–18 June
- Host city: Kazan, Russia
- Venue: Central Stadium (Kazan)

The athletics competitions at the 2024 BRICS Games took place between 15 and 18 June at the Central Stadium in Kazan, Russia. It was the first time that athletics was contested at the BRICS Games.

== Medal summary ==
=== Men ===
Event	Gold		Silver		Bronze	
100 m (Note: Multi-heat timed final)	Danila Ten; Russia	10.25 (±0.0 m/s)	Konstantin Krylov; Russia	10.32 (±0.0 m/s)	Mikita Zhyhar; Belarus	10.38 (+0.2 m/s)
200 m	Konstantin Krylov; Russia	20.63 (+0.1 m/s)	Letlhogonolo Moleyane; South Africa	20.69 (+0.1 m/s)	Animesh Kujur; India	20.79 (+0.1 m/s)
400 m	Saveliy Savlukov; Russia	45.52	Liang Baotang; China	45.65	Aleksandr Masyutenko; Russia	45.71
800 m	Dzmitry Savin; Belarus	1:48.50	Konstantin Kholmogorov; Russia	1:49.12	Somnath Chauhan; India	1:49.23
1500 m	Viachaslau Skudny; Belarus	3:45.86	Dzmitry Savin; Belarus	3:46.23	Yoonus Shah; India	3:46.60
5000 m	Vladimir Nikitin; Russia	13:20.60	Anatoliy Rybakov; Russia	13:33.62	Debessay Desale; Eritrea	13:52.18
10,000 m racewalk	Sergey Kozhevnikov; Russia	38:16.08	Vasiliy Mizinov; Russia	38:34.84	Sergey Shirobokov; Russia	39:23:44
110 m hurdles (wind: +0.6 m/s)	Artyom Makarenko; Russia	13.55	Sergey Shubenkov; Russia	13.70	Zhang Zijun; China	13.79
400 m hurdles	Fedor Ivanov; Russia	49.35	Vladimir Lysenko; Russia	50.27	Bienvenu Sawadogo; Burkina Faso	50.83
3000 m steeplechase	Konstantin Plokhotnikov; Russia	8:30.73	Dzmitry Ivanenka; Belarus	8:38.93	Nikita Kalganov; Russia	8:43.15
4 × 100 m relay	Russia; Danil Roslyakov; Danila Ten; Andrey Lukin; Konstantin Krylov	38.95	China; Chen Qiwei; Fang Fenghe; Huang Xuxin; Zhang Donghai	39.96	Brazil; Lucca Simões; João Henrique Cabral; Alex Andrade; Leonardo Santos	40.74
4 × 400 m relay	Russia; Dmitriy Razumov; Artem Araslanov; Saveliy Savlukov; Aleksandr Masyutenko	3:03.20	Belarus; Mark Patsei; Mikhail Mikhnouski; Ihar Zubko; Raman Valodzkin	3:04.87	Kyrgyzstan; Ivan Kuritsyn; Uulu Maisalbek Mukumbek; Musulman Dzholomanov; Ruslan Litovskiy	3:30.96
High jump	Danil Lysenko; Russia	2.30 m	Pavel Seliverstau; Belarus	2.30 m	Mikita Danilau; Belarus	2.27 m
Pole vault	Mikhail Shmykov; Russia	5.82 m	Aleksandr Solovev; Russia	5.82 m	Matvei Volkov; Belarus	5.50 m
Long jump	Artyom Chermoshanskiy; Russia	8.18 m	Yuriy Ozhgibesov; Russia	7.80 m	Uladzislau Bulakhau; Belarus	7.70 m
Triple jump	Dmitriy Chizhikov; Russia	16.80 m (−0.1 m/s)	Vitaliy Pavlov; Russia	16.75 m (−0.7 m/s)	Ilia Telkunov; Russia	16.74 m (−2.6 m/s)
Shot put	Aleh Tamashevich; Belarus	20.71 m	Maksim Afonin; Russia	20.28 m	Aleksandr Lesnoy; Russia	18.95 m
Discus throw	Aleksey Khudyakov; Russia	62.08 m	Aleksandr Dobrenkiy; Russia	58.62 m	Uladzislau Puchko; Belarus	58.40 m
Hammer throw	Valeriy Pronkin; Russia	78.13 m	Aliaksandr Shymanovich; Belarus	77.34 m	Andrey Romanov; Russia	74.51 m
Javelin throw	Boris Bezdolnyi; Russia	85.38 m	Aliaksei Katkavets; Belarus	78.86 m	Dmitriy Tarabin; Russia	78.00 m
Decathlon	Maksim Andraloits; Belarus	8279 pts	Aleksandr Komarov; Russia	8104 pts	Stepan Kekin; Russia	8061 pts

=== Women ===
Event	Gold		Silver		Bronze	
100 m (wind: ±0.0 m/s)	Kristina Makarenko; Russia	11.31	Natalya Kombarova; Russia	11.42 (.411)	Yuliya Karavaeva; Russia	11.42 (.416)
200 m	Natalya Kombarova; Russia	23.10 (−0.3 m/s)	Viktoria Maksimova; Russia	23.29 (−0.2 m/s)	Vera Filatova; Russia	23.55 (−0.2 m/s)
400 m	Polina Tkalich; Russia	50.16	Hanna Mikhailava; Belarus	51.65	Anna Sadovnicheva; Russia	51.89
800 m	Maria Prokhorets; Russia	2:02.68	Nigina Tukhtaeva; Russia	2:03.09	Ekaterina Samuylova; Russia	2:03.16
1500 m	Svetlana Aplachkina; Russia	4:12.06	Yana Perepelitsa; Russia	4:13.00	Yuliya Popova; Russia	4:13.91
5000 m	Lyubov Dubrovskaya; Russia	15:33.92	Olga Vovk; Russia	15:35.88	Mariia Ermakova; Russia	15:42.64
10,000 m racewalk	Reikhan Kagramanova; Russia	41:57.80	Elvira Khasanova; Russia	43:05.97	Anna Terlyukevich; Belarus	43:32.07
100 m hurdles	Elvira Hrabarenka; Belarus	12.81 (+0.2 m/s)	Viktoria Pogrebniak; Russia	13.13 (+0.2 m/s)	Sviatlana Parakhonka; Belarus	13.15 (+0.2 m/s)
400 m hurdles	Tangara Emiliya; Russia	55.66	Katsiaryna Belanovich; Belarus	56.42	Aliaksandra Khilmanovich; Belarus	56.50
3000 m steeplechase	Ekaterina Ivonina; Russia	9:28.16	Anna Tropina; Russia	9:36.11	Tatsiana Shabanava; Belarus	9:38.95
4 × 100 m relay	Belarus; Karyna Salauyova; Lizaveta Tratsiak; Yanina Lutsenka; Elvira Hrabarenka	44.28	Brazil; Andreza Reis; Gleyci Nascimento; Sarah Freitas; Pietra Simões	49.41	Only two finishing teams (Note: The Russian team was disqualified due to "WA Rule TR 24.7-passing of the baton outside of the takeover zone (late)".)	
4 × 400 m relay	Russia; Veronika Arkhipova; Antonina Krivoshapka; Anna Sadovnicheva; Polina Tkalich	3:23.95	Belarus; Aliaksandra Khilmanovich; Krystsina Muliarchyk; Katsiaryna Zhyvayeva; Hanna Mikhailava	3:25.62	Brazil; Pietra Simões; Gleyci Nascimento; Andreza Reis; Isabelle de Almeida	4:21.61
High jump	Mariia Kochanova; Russia	1.95 m	Yelizaveta Valuyeva; Belarus	1.95 m	Polina Parfenenko; Russia	1.95 m
Pole vault	Polina Knoroz; Russia	4.80 m	Aksana Gataullina; Russia	4.55 m	Tatiana Kalinina; Russia	4.45 m
Long jump	Elena Sokolova; Russia	6.71 m (−1.6 m/s)	Ekaterina Levitskaia; Russia	6.45 m (−1.5 m/s)	Ramilya Valitova; Russia	6.15 m (−1.8 m/s)
Triple jump	Viyaleta Skvartsova; Belarus	14.41 m (+0.7 m/s)	Daria Nidbaykina; Russia	14.22 m (+0.3 m/s)	Ekaterina Koneva; Russia	14.13 m (+0.1 m/s)
Shot put	Aliona Dubitskaya; Belarus	18.58 m	Alena Gordeeva; Russia	17.70 m	Olga Batyreva; Russia	17.32 m
Discus throw	Violetta Ignateva; Russia	59.96 m	Maria Ogritsko; Russia	57.15 m	Elena Panova; Russia	56.37 m
Hammer throw	Anastasiya Maslova; Belarus	72.26 m	Alena Sobaleva; Belarus	70.38 m	Elizaveta Tsareva; Russia	67.96 m
Javelin throw	Tatsiana Khaladovich; Belarus	61.10 m	Ella Kuznetsova; Russia	61.07 m	Maya Bogatyreva; Russia	58.27 m
Heptathlon	Elizaveta Slobodyanyuk; Russia	5863 pts	Yuliya Sokhatskaya; Russia	5826 pts	Svetlana Antoshina; Russia	5739 pts

== Medal table ==
Rank	Nation	Gold	Silver	Bronze	Total
1	Russia (RUS)	32	27	23	82
2	Belarus (BLR)	10	11	9	30
3	China (CHN)	0	2	1	3
4	Brazil (BRA)	0	1	2	3
5	South Africa (RSA)	0	1	0	1
6	India (IND)	0	0	3	3
7	Burkina Faso (BUR)	0	0	1	1
7	Eritrea (ERI)	0	0	1	1
7	Kyrgyzstan (KGZ)	0	0	1	1
Totals (9 entries)		42	42	41	125
