= Keaton Daniel =

American pole vaulter (born 2001)

Personal information
- Born: 8 April 2001 (age 25)

Sport
- Sport: Athletics
- Event: Pole vault

Achievements and titles
- Personal best: Pole vault: 5.82 m (2024)

Keaton Daniel (born 8 April 2001) is an American pole vaulter. He won 2024 NCAA Championship titles both Indoors and Outdoors.

== Early life ==
He was a two-time Nevada high school state champion before attending Fresno Pacific College. He later transferred to the University of Kentucky.

== Career ==
Competing for the University of Kentucky, he won NCAA outdoors silver and bronze medals in 2021 and 2022.

Daniel won the SEC Indoor Championships in February 2024. He then won the 2024 NCAA Division I Indoor Track and Field Championships in Boston, Massachusetts, clearing 5.70 metres, in March 2024 to win Kentucky's first-ever pole vault national championship.

He won the 2024 NCAA Division I Outdoor Track and Field Championships in Eugene, Oregon in June 2024, with a height of 5.67 metres. He cleared a personal best 5.82 metres to finish fourth in the pole vault at the 2024 US Olympic Trials in Eugene, Oregon in June 2024.

He cleared 5.70 metres to place fifth overall at the 2025 BAUHAUS-galan event in Stockholm, part of the 2025 Diamond League. He finished fourth at the 2025 Prefontaine Classic on 5 July.

A clearance of 5.60m was enough to defeat Simone Bertelli and Valentin Lavillenie on countback at the StarPerche World Athletics Indoor Tour Bronze meeting in Bordeaux in January 2026.
