= Dev Meena =

Indian pole vaulter (born 2005)

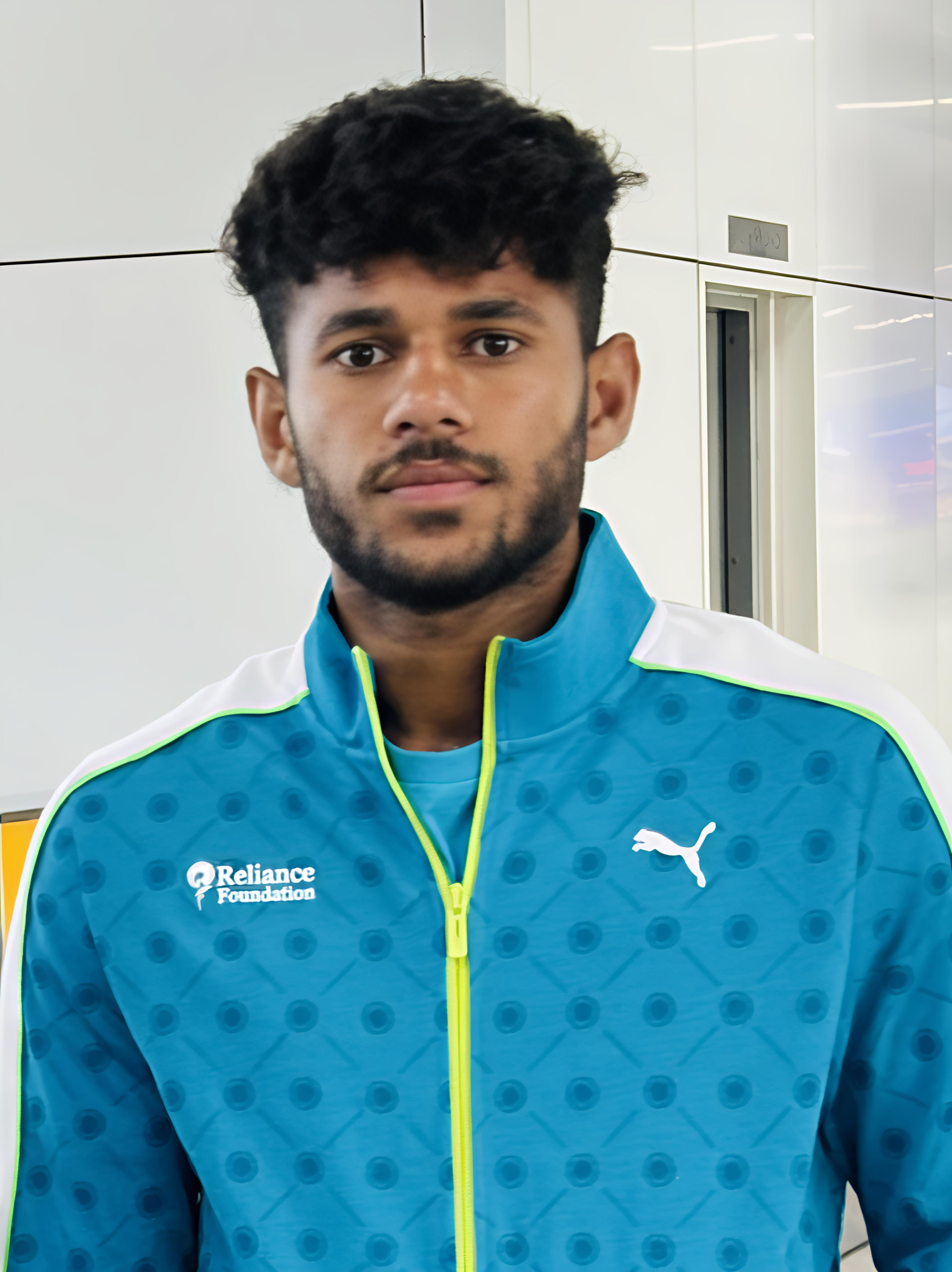
- Meena in 2025

Personal information
- Full name: Dev Kumar Meena
- Born: 7 May 2005 (age 21) Dewas, Madhya Pradesh, India

Sport
- Sport: Athletics
- Event: Pole vault
- Coached by: Ángel García

Achievements and titles
- Personal bests: 5.50 m NR (2026)
Medal record
Men's athletics
Representing India
Asian U20 Championships
| Bronze medal – third place | 2024 Dubai | Pole vault |

Dev Kumar Meena (born 7 May 2005) is an Indian pole vaulter.

== Early life ==
Meena was born on 7 May 2005 in Dewas in Madhya Pradesh, India. He initially competed as a 400 m runner before shifting to pole vaulting on the advice of coach Ghanshyam Yadav, who considered his physique suited to the event. He trains at the Madhya Pradesh Athletics Academy in Bhopal. He has also worked with international coach Ángel García while pursuing a Bachelor of Arts degree at Khalsa College, Amritsar.

== Career ==
Meena made his international debut at the 2023 Asian U20 Championships in Yecheon, where he failed to clear the opening height and did not record a valid mark.

At the 2024 Asian U20 Championships in Dubai, he won the bronze medal with a best effort of 5.10 m. Later at the 2024 World U20 Championships in Lima, he placed 22nd in the qualification round among 32 athletes with a clearance of 4.95 m and did not advance to the final.

He finished fifth at the 2025 World University Games in Bochum, with a vault of 5.35 m.

At the 2026 National Inter-State Championships in Bhubaneswar, he cleared 5.46 m to win the gold medal and set a new national record. He missed the podium with a fourth-place finish at the 2026 Commonwealth Games in Glasgow, clearing 5.30 m.

== International competitions ==
Representing India
| Year | Competition | Host | Position | Result |
|---|---|---|---|---|
| 2023 | Asian U20 Championships | Yecheon, South Korea | – | NM |
| 2024 | Asian U20 Championships | Dubai, UAE | 3rd | 5.10 m |
| 2024 | World U20 Championships | Lima, Peru | 22nd (Q) | 4.95 m |
| 2025 | World University Games | Bochum, Germany | 5th | 5.35 m |
| 2026 | Commonwealth Games | Glasgow, Scotland | 4th | 5.30 m |
