= Juho Alasaari =

Finnish pole vaulter (born 2003)

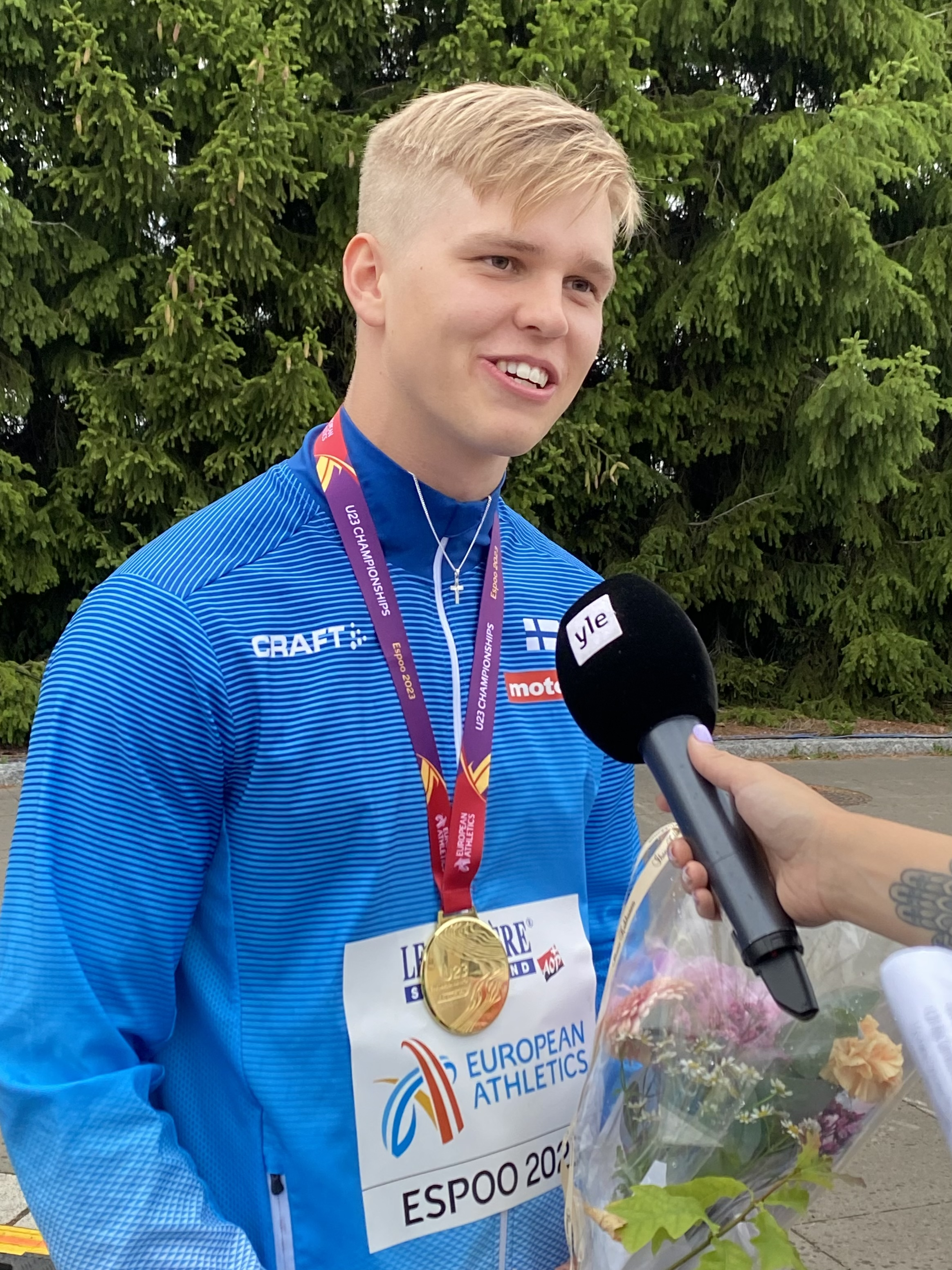
- Alasaari in 2023

Personal information
- Born: 29 September 2003 (age 22)

Sport
- Sport: Athletics
- Event: Pole vault
Medal record
Men's athletics
Representing Finland
European U23 Championships
Gold medal – first place	2023 Espoo	Pole vault
World U20 Championships
Silver medal – second place	2021 Nairobi	Pole vault
Silver medal – second place	2022 Cali	Pole vault
European Youth Olympic Festival
Silver medal – second place	2019 Baku	Pole vault

Juho Alasaari (born 29 September 2003) is a Finnish pole vaulter. He won silver medals at the World U20 Championships in 2021 and 2022 and the gold medal at the 2023 European U23 Championships.

== Biography ==
Competing at the 2019 European Youth Olympic Festival (EYOF) in Baku, Azerbaijan, he won the silver medal with a jump of 4.90 metres.

He won the silver medal at the 2021 World Athletics U20 Championships in Nairobi, Kenya, with a jump of 5.35 metres. The following year, he won another silver medal at the 2022 World Athletics U20 Championships in Cali, Colombia, with a jump of 5.60 metres, surpassing his personal best by 7 centimetres.

The Finnish senior champion in pole vault both indoors and outdoors in 2023, he won the gold medal at the 2023 European Athletics U23 Championships he won the gold medal in Espoo, Finland, with a new personal best clearance of 5.71 metres. He subsequently competed for Finland at the senior 2023 World Championship in Budapest, Hungary.

Competing at the 2024 European Athletics Championships in Rome, Italy, in June, he jumped 5.25 m and did not advance to the final, but retained his Finnish national title later that month.

In 2025, he won the Finnish indoor national title, and finished seventh at the 2025 European Athletics U23 Championships in Bergen, Norway, with a jump of 5.30 m.

In July 2026, he won the Finnish outdoor title again, and the following month competed at the 2026 European Athletics Championships in Birmingham, England, qualifying for the final and placing thirteenth overall.
