= Valters Kreišs =

Latvian athlete (born 2003)

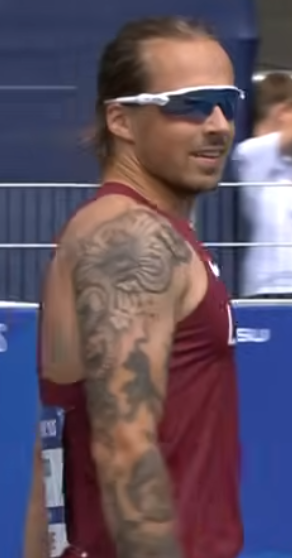
- At the 2025 World University Games

Personal information
- Born: 19 September 2003 (age 22) Riga, Latvia

Sport
- Sport: Athletics
- Event: Pole vault

Achievements and titles
- Personal bests: Pole vault: 5.82m (Roubaix, 2025)
Medal record
Men's athletics
Representing Latvia
Summer World University Games
Silver medal – second place	2025 Bochum	Pole vault
European U23 Championships
Bronze medal – third place	2025 Bergen	Pole Vault

Valters Kreišs (born 19 September 2003) is a Latvian pole vaulter and Latvian record holder in pole vault.

== Biography ==
Born and raised in Riga, Kreišs attended Rīgas sporta skola "Arkādija". He is coached by Mareks Ārents.

He won the Latvian national championship pole vault title for the first time in July 2023 in Valmiera. He finished fourth in the pole vault at the 2023 European Athletics U23 Championships in Espoo, Finland, with a new personal best height of 5.60 metres.

He made his senior championships debut at the 2024 European Athletics Championships in Rome, where a clearance of 5.45 meters saw him share 14th place. That month, he increased his personal best and Latvian under-23 record to 5.72 metres and retained his Latvian national title. He competed in the pole vault at the 2024 Paris Olympics where he qualified for the final with a 5.70 metres clearance, before placing twelfth overall in the final. In February 2025 he set a new national record with a 5.82 metres clearance at Roubaix.

He competed at the 2025 European Athletics Indoor Championships in Apeldoorn, Netherlands where he cleared 5.75 metres in the qualifying round to reach the final of the competition. In the final, he finished in sixth place overall, the highest finish achieved by a Latvian athlete at the Championships.

He competed at the 2025 World Athletics Indoor Championships in Nanjing in March 2025, where he tied for eighth place in the pole vault with a 5.50 metres clearance. It was the best placed finish by a Latvian athlete at a global games for 15 years. He won the gold medal at the 2025 European Athletics U23 Championships in Bergen, Norway in July 2025. Later that month, he won the silver medal for Latvia at the 2025 Summer World University Games in Germany. He competed at the 2025 World Athletics Championships in Tokyo, Japan, in September 2025, without advancing to the final.

In August 2026, he competed at the 2026 European Athletics Championships in Birmingham, England.
