= Athletics at the 2026 Commonwealth Games – Men's pole vault =

Men's pole vault at the 2026 Commonwealth Games
- Venue: Scotstoun Stadium, Glasgow
- Dates: 30 July (qualification); 1 August (final)
- Competitors: 13 from 10 nations
- Winning Height: 5.85 m

Medalists
gold medal	Kurtis Marschall	Australia
silver medal	Kyle Rademeyer	South Africa
bronze medal	Owen Heard	England

The men's pole vault at the 2026 Commonwealth Games, as part of the athletics programme, will take place in the Scotstoun Stadium between 30 July and 1 August 2026.

== Records ==
Prior to this competition, the existing world, Commonwealth and Commonwealth Games records were as follows:

Men's Pole vault
World record	6.31 m	Armand Duplantis (SWE)	12 Mar 2026	Uppsala, Sweden
Commonwealth record	6.05 m	Dmitri Markov (AUS)	9 Aug 2001	Edmonton, Canada
Games record	5.85 m	Kurtis Marschall (AUS)	1 Aug 2026	Glasgow, Scotland

== Schedule ==
The schedule is as follows:

Date	Time	Round
30 July 2026	10:00	Qualification
1 August 2026	19:00	Final

All times are British Summer Time (UTC+1)

== Results ==
An original qualification round was cancelled, and the event proceeded to a straight final.

=== Final ===
The final of the men's pole vault took place on the evening of 1 August 2026.

Rank	Name	Country	4.90	5.10	5.30	5.40	5.50	5.60	5.70	5.80	5.85	Result	Notes
1st place, gold medalist(s)	Kurtis Marschall	Australia	-	-	-	o	-	o	o	o	xo	5.85	GR
2nd place, silver medalist(s)	Kyle Rademeyer	South Africa	-	-	o	xo	o	o	xo	xxx		5.70	SB
3rd place, bronze medalist(s)	Owen Heard	England	-	o	o	o	o	o	xxo	xxx		5.70	
4	Dev Meena	India	-	o	o	xxx						5.30	
5	Thomas Walley	Wales	o	xo	xxo	xxx						5.30	
6	Kuldeep Kumar	India	o	o	xx-	x						5.10	
7	Nicholas Southgate	New Zealand	o	xo	xxx							5.10	
8	James Steyn	New Zealand	xo	xo	xxx							5.10	
9	Christos Tamanis	Cyprus	o	xxo	xxx							5.10	
10	Dimitris Christofi	Cyprus	xo	xxx								4.90	
10	Jun Yu Low	Singapore	xo	xxx								4.90	
-	Arunthavarasa Puvitharan	Sri Lanka	xxx									NM	
-	Jax Thoirs	Scotland	-	xxx								NM	
