= Gillian Ladwig =

German pole vaulter (born 1998)

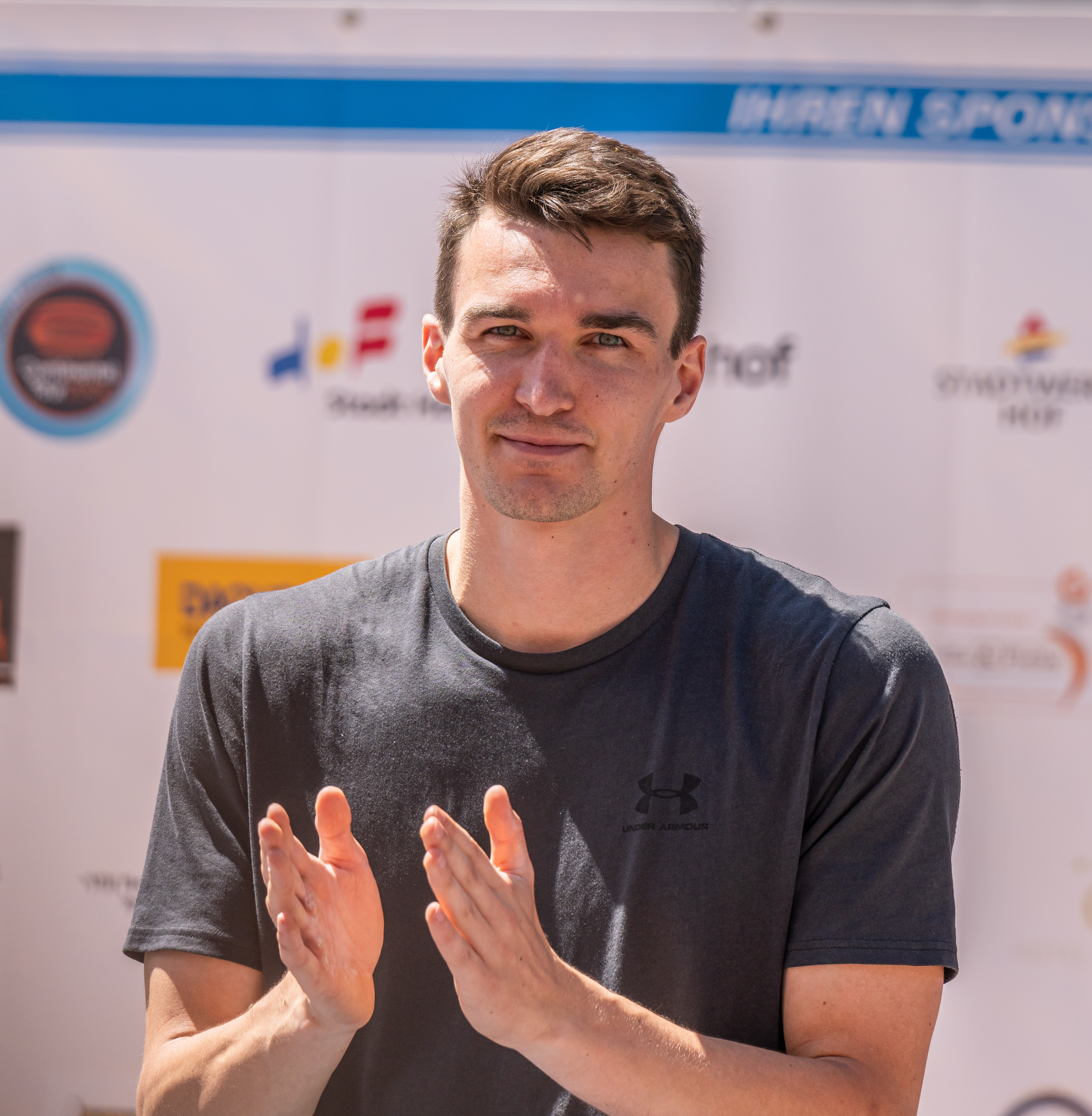
- Gillian Ladwig

Personal information
- Born: 3 December 1998 (age 27)

Sport
- Sport: Athletics
- Event: Pole vault

Gillian Ladwig (born 3 December 1998) is a German pole vaulter. He won the German national title in 2025 and represented his country at the 2023 World Athletics Championships.

== Biography ==
From Schwerin, and a member of Schweriner SC, he won two bronze medals at the German Youth Championships in pole vault. As an U23 athlete, he improved his pole vault personal best to 5.35 meters.

He cleared a personal best 5.72 metres in 2022 at the Aachen Cathedral Jump, and placed fourth at the German Championships with 5.70 metres. The following year, he made his international debut for Germany at the 2023 European Athletics Indoor Championships in Istanbul. He placed sixth at the 2023 European Athletics Team Championships in Chorzow in June 2023 with a jump of 5.65 metres. Having placed third at the German Championships in Braunschweig, he competed at the 2023 World Athletics Championships in Budapest, Hungary. However his career was stalled the following year by a knee injury that took a full-year to heal sufficiently for him to compete at his best.

Ladwig finished third at the 2025 German Indoor Championships with a clearance of 5.62 metres. He became German champion for his first national title later that year at the age of 26 years-old, with a clearance of 5.65 metres to win the men's pole vault at the 2025 German Athletics Championships in Dresden, amongst a highly competitive field that included Oleg Zernikel, Torben Blech, and Bo Kanda Lita Baehre.

Defending his national at the German championships in Hanover Opera Square in July 2026, he failed to register a height in extremely windy conditions in which no competitor jumped higher than 5.40 metres in the non-stadium event. In August 2026, he competed at the 2026 European Athletics Championships in Birmingham, England, qualifying for the final and placing eleventh overall.

== Personal life ==
He is a Sargent in the Mecklenburg-Western Pomerania state police force.
