= Aleksandr Solovyov (pole vaulter) =

Russian pole vaulter (born 2002)

Personal information
- Born: 18 February 2002 (age 24)

Sport
- Sport: Athletics
- Event: Pole vault

Achievements and titles
- Personal best: Pole vault: 5.83 m (2024)

Aleksandr Solovyov (born 18 February 2002) is a Russian pole vaulter. He won the 2024 Russian Indoor Athletics Championships. He won the 2025 NCAA Outdoor Championships.

== Early life ==
From an athletics family, his grandfather was also a pole vaulter. From the age of three and eleven years-old, however, his focus was on ice dancing. He began to be coached from young age in pole vaulting by Oleg Vyacheslavovich.

== Career ==
He finished seventh in the pole vault at the 2021 World Athletics U20 Championships in Nairobi, Kenya.

He cleared 5.77 metres to win the Russian Indoor Athletics Championships in Moscow in February 2024. Later that year, he won the Russian summer youth championship and the Russian team championship in Sochi with a jump of 5.72 metres. At the BRICS Games in Kazan in June 2024, he finished in second place overall with a height of 5.82 metres. He also won the 2024 Russia Cup with a personal best height of 5.83 metres.

He began competing for Texas A&M University in the United States in December 2024. He recorded no height at the SEC Indoor Championships, but won the SEC Outdoor Championships in May with a clearance of 5.72 metres. He jumped 5.78 metres to win the 2025 NCAA Division I Outdoor Track and Field Championships in Eugene, Oregon, in June 2025. His effort helped the Texas Aggies to a share of the overall NCAA Men's team title.

Competing at the 2026 NCAA Division I Indoor Track and Field Championships in March, he placed second overall behind Ashton Barkdull.
