= Ethan Cormont =

French athlete (born 2000)

Personal information
- Born: 29 September 2000 (age 26) Créteil, France
- Height: 178 cm (5 ft 10 in)
- Weight: 63 kg (139 lb)

Sport
- Country: France
- Sport: Athletics
- Event: Pole vault
- Club: ASA Maisons-Alfort
Medal record
Men's athletics
Representing France
European U23 Championships
Gold medal – first place	2021 Tallinn	Pole Vault

Ethan Cormont (born 29 September 2000 in Créteil) is a French Olympic athlete who competes in the pole vault.

== Early life ==
From Maisons-Alfort and coached by Alain Kouznetzoff, in February 2019, he broke the French junior pole vault record, until then held by Jean Galfione, by crossing 5.62m. In the process he won the national junior title.

== Career ==
He won the bronze medal in the pole vault competition of the 2020 French championships, crossing 5.58m to finish behind brothers Renaud Lavillenie (gold) and Valentin Lavillenie (silver).

On January 31, 2021, he broke his personal best by passing 5.72m. On this occasion he achieved the minimum for the European indoor championships. A week later, he broke his record again by crossing 5.73 m in Rouen. At the French indoor championships in Miramas on February 21, 2021, he won the silver medal with a jump to 5.72m, behind Valentin Lavillenie but in front of Renaud Lavillenie. Later that month he cleared 5.80m for a new personal best. In July 2021, he equalled this height to win the 2021 European Athletics U23 Championships in Tallinn. At the Tokyo Olympics Corment cleared 5.50m and finished twelfth in his qualifying group.

At the 2023 European Athletics Indoor Championships Cormont cleared 5.75m to make the final.

He was a finalist at the 2025 World Athletics Championships in Tokyo, Japan, in September 2025, placing eleventh overall.
