= Jax Thoirs =

Scottish Pole vaulter

Personal information
- Nationality: British (Scottish)
- Born: 7 April 1993 (age 33)

Sport
- Sport: Athletics
- Event: Pole vault

Achievements and titles
- Personal bests: Pole vault: 5.65 m (Los Angeles, 2015)

Jax Thoirs (born 7 April 1993) is a Scottish pole vaulter. He placed fourth at the 2014 Commonwealth Games and won the 2016 NCAA Indoor Championships, and after a career break from athletics, was runner-up at the 2026 British Indoor Championships.

== Biography ==
From Glasgow, Thoirs set a new Scottish pole vault record of 5.60 metres competing in Seattle in 2014. Thoirs placed fourth representing Scotland in the pole vault at the 2014 Commonwealth Games in Glasgow. He made his British team at the 2015 European Athletics Team Championships in Russia.

In 2015, he set a new Scottish record when he cleared 5.65m at the PAC-12 Champs in Los Angeles as he retained his title that he also won in 2014. Thoirs won the pole vault at the 2016 NCAA Division I Indoor Track and Field Championships competing for the University of Washington. He was runner-up at the 2017 British Athletics Championships in Birmingham after a jump-off at 5.45m with Englishman Luke Cutts.

In 2018, Thoirs had to overcome suffering a blood clot in his arm and was unable to compete despite being initially selected to represent Scotland on the Gold Coast at the 2018 Commonwealth Games.

Thoirs had a career break from athletics after losing motivation to train during the COVID-19 pandemic. After returning to action, he cleared 5.32m in Scotland at the 2026 4J National Open in January 2026 to meet the qualifying standard for the 2026 Commonwealth Games. On 14 February, Thoirs was runner-up at the 2026 British Indoor Championships to Owen Heard, with 5.45 metres. Thoirs competes for Scotland in the pole vault at the 2026 Commonwealth Games in Glasgow, Scotland.
