= Kyle Rademeyer =

South African athlete (born 2002)

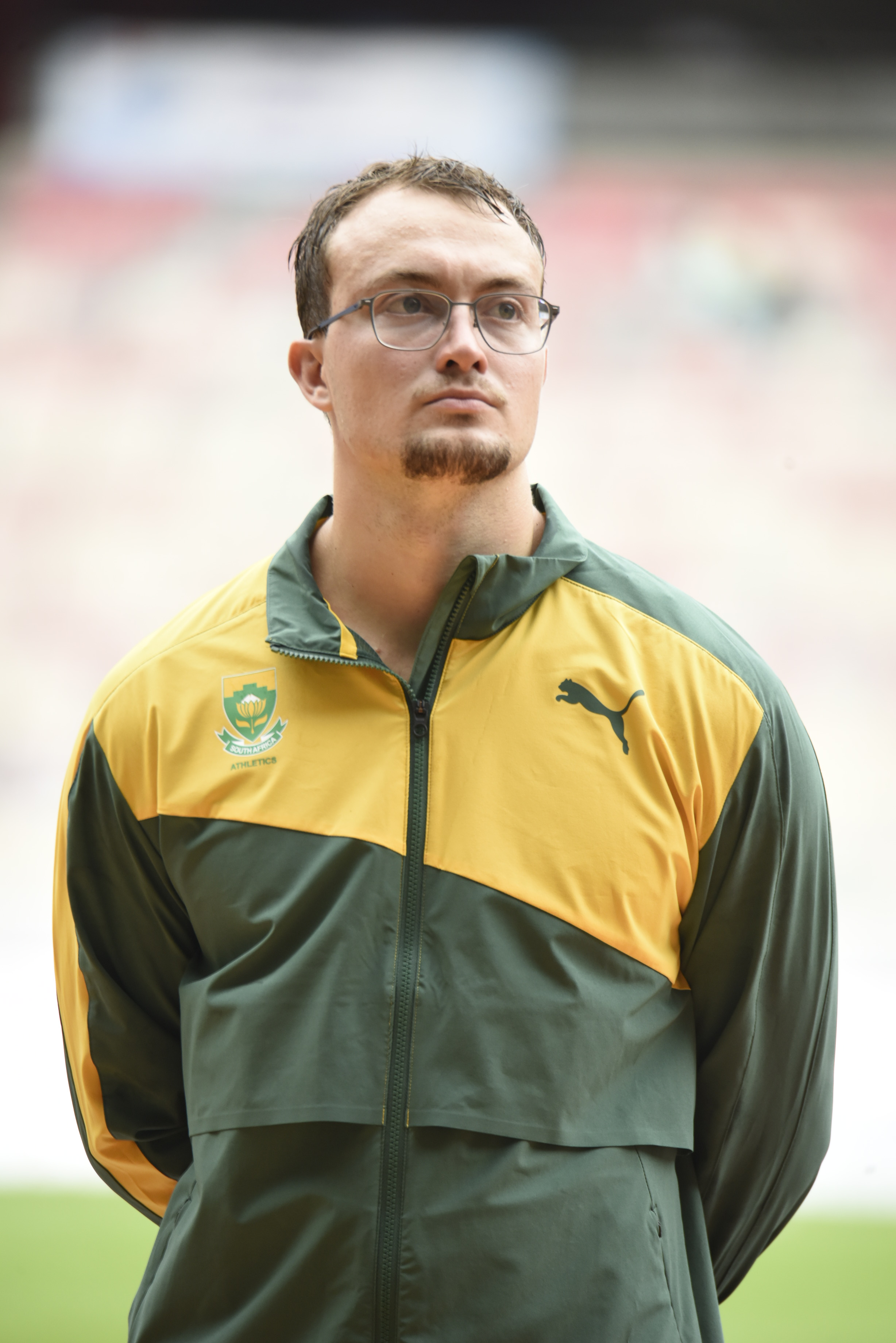
- Rademeyer in 2024

Personal information
- Nationality: South African
- Born: 29 January 2002 (age 24)

Sport
- Sport: Athletics
- Event: Pole vault

Achievements and titles
- Personal best: Pole vault: 5.73m (2025)
Medal record
Men's athletics
Representing South Africa
African Championships
Gold medal – first place	2024 Douala	Pole vault
Commonwealth Games
Silver medal – second place	2026 Glasgow	Pole vault

Kyle Rademeyer (born 29 January 2002) is a South African pole vaulter. He won the gold medal at the 2024 African Championships and the silver medal at the 2026 Commonwealth Games.

== Biography ==
He is from Paarl in the Western Cape of South Africa but later studied in the United States at the University of South Alabama. He won the bronze medal at the 2021 World Athletics U20 Championships in Nairobi, Kenya. He was selected to represent South Africa at the 2022 Commonwealth Games in Birmingham, England but had to withdraw after testing positive for COVID-19.

He won the 2023 NCAA Division I Outdoor Track and Field Championships in Austin, Texas with a clearance of 5.70 metres competing for the South Alabama Jaguars. He competed for South Africa at the 2023 World Athletics Championships in Budapest, Hungary at the age of 21 years-old, and although he did not reach the final, Rademeyer missed out only by five centimetres, and was just one centimetre short of his 5.71m personal best in the qualifying round. He was a gold medalist in the pole vault at the 2024 African Championships in Douala, Cameroon in June 2024.

In February 2025 in Birmingham, Alabama he cleared a new personal best as well as setting a new school record, meet record and Sun Belt Conference record with a clearance of 5.73m in winning the Conference Indoor Championships for Southern Alabama. He won his sixth first-team All-America NCAA honours after he cleared 5.61m to place fifth in the pole vault 2025 NCAA Division I Indoor Track and Field Championships in Virginia Beach to became the Jaguar Track athlete with the most NCAA honours in their programme history.

He competed at the 2025 World Athletics Championships in Tokyo, Japan, in September 2025, without advancing to the final. On 1 August 2026, he cleared 5.70 metres to win the silver medal at the 2026 Commonwealth Games in Glasgow, Scotland.
