= Robin Emig =

French pole vaulter (born 2001)

Personal information
- Born: 6 June 2001 (age 25) Marseille, France
- Height: 183 cm (6 ft 0 in)
- Weight: 85 kg (187 lb)

Sport
- Sport: Athletics
- Event: Pole Vault

Achievements and titles
- Personal best: Pole Vault: 5.75m (2024)
Medal record
Men's Athletics
Representing France
European U23 Championships
Silver medal – second place	2023 Espoo	Pole Vault
European U20 Championships
Bronze medal – third place	2019 Boras	Pole Vault

Robin Emig (born 6 June 2001) is a French pole vaulter.

== Career ==
He was a bronze medalist at the 2019 European Athletics U20 Championships in Boras.

He was a silver medalist at the 2023 European Athletics U23 Championships in Espoo.

He set a new personal best of 5.75 metres competing in France in January 2024, and matched that again two weeks later in Miramas.

He qualified for the final of the pole vault at the 2024 European Athletics Championships in Rome, placing eleventh overall. He competed in the pole vault at the 2024 Paris Olympics.

== Personal life ==
He is from Gap, Hautes-Alpes.
