= CamSoda =

Adult entertainment website

- CamSoda logo
- Website type: Webcam, live streaming
- Creator: Daron Lundeen
- Website: camsoda.com
- Launched: 2014; 12 years ago
- Current status: Active

CamSoda is a pornographic live streaming webcam platform started by Daron Lundeen in 2014.

The video streaming platform provides for adult webcams and non-adult livestreams. CamSoda was the first to offer 360-degree virtual reality live streams.

It offers products involving virtual reality touch-screen technology, interactive sex toys and products powered by Bitcoin and Ethereum.
