= Ylio Philtjens =

Belgian pole vaulter (born 2006)

Personal information
- Born: 8 April 2006 (age 20)

Sport
- Sport: Athletics
- Event: Pole vault
Medal record
Men's athletics
Representing Belgium
European U20 Championships
Bronze medal – third place	2025 Tampere	Pole vault
European Youth Olympic Festival
Gold medal – first place	2022 Banska Bystrica	Pole vault

Ylio Philtjens (born 8 April 2006) is a Belgian pole vaulter. He was a bronze medalist at the 2025 European Athletics U20 Championships.

== Biography ==
A member of TACT from Sint-Truiden in the Belgian province of Limburg, Philtjens won a gold medal in the pole vault at the 2022 European Youth Summer Olympic Festival in Banska Bystrica, Slovakia. He competed for Belgium at the 2024 World Athletics U20 Championships in Lima, Peru, narrowly missing a place in the final on count-back.

Having entered the competition with a personal best clearance of 5.32 metres, Philtjens was a bronze medalist at the 2025 European Athletics U20 Championships in Tampere, finishing behind Axel Rogö and Zackaria Dia but equal with Paweł Pośpiech of Poland with a clearance of 5.30 metres.

Competing indoors in the March 2026, he vaulted a new personal best of 5.47 metres to win the Belgian U23 Indoor Championships in Louvain-La-Neuve. He then improved his personal best to 5.63m in June 2026 in Vrbovec near Zagreb, Croatia, moving to sixth on the Belgian all-time list. He then added seven centimetres in July, as he cleared a new personal best 5.70 metres in Hannut. With that clearance, he equaled the Belgian U23 record, set by Thibaut Duval in 2000. In August 2026, he competed at the 2026 European Athletics Championships in Birmingham, England, only needing one attempt at 5.25m, 5.45m, and 5.60m in the qualifying round on his major championship debut at the age of 20 years-old, prior to placing tenth overall in the final.
