= Ioannis Rizos =

Greek pole vaulter

Medal record

Men's athletics

Representing Greece

Mediterranean Games
Bronze medal – third place	2022 Oran	Pole vault

Ioannis Rizos (Greek: Ιωάννης Ρίζος; born 2 March 2000) is a Greek pole vaulter.

== Career ==
He represented the club Aris Thessaloniki. until 2025 and then transeferred to MEAS Triton. In his early career, he became Balkan U20 champion in 2018, competed at the 2019 European Junior Championships without reaching the final and finished tenth at the 2021 European U23 Championships. His transition into an elite senior jumper happened in 2022.

From a personal best of 5.35 metres in 2021, Rizos improved to 5.45 as he won the silver medal at the 2022 Balkan Indoor Championships. He then jumped 5.50 in Kalamata in May. After no-marking at the 2022 Balkan Championships and taking the bronze at the Greek Championships, Rizos jumped 5.60 metres to take the bronze medal at the 2022 Mediterranean Games.

In 2023 he took silver medals at the Greek championship indoors and outdoors, and finished fifth at the Balkan Championships. A weaker season's best of 5.52 from July 2023 was equalled in January 2024, and then improved to 5.56. Rizos then won the 2024 Balkan Indoor Championships, became runner-up at the Greek Indoor Championships and Balkan Championships, and competed at the 2024 European Championships without reaching the final. He then set a new personal best of 5.62 at the Greek Championships where he again finished second. He followed up by taking another silver at the 2025 Greek Indoor Championships and competing at the 2025 European Indoor Championshipswithout reaching the final.

In July 2025 he improved his personal best to 5.73 metres at the Panathinaiko Stadio, before winning the silver medal at the 2025 Balkan Championships in 5.65. In early August 2025 he jumped 5.65 once again and took second place at the national championship in Volos. He also participated at the 2025 World Athletics Championships in Tokyo in which he jumped 5.40 placing 30th overall.

In 2026 he jumped 5.55 indoors and 5.70 outdoors. Then he competed at the 2026 European Athletics Championships where he didn't clear his opening height during the qualification round.
