= Hendrik Müller =

German athlete (born 2005)

Personal information
- Nationality: German
- Born: 2 March 2005 (age 21)

Sport
- Sport: Athletics
- Event: Pole Vault

Achievements and titles
- Personal best: Pole vault: 5.55m (2024)
Medal record
World Junior Championships
Gold medal – first place	2024 Lima	Pole vault

Hendrik Müller (born 2 March 2005) is a German pole vaulter. He was runner-up at the German Athletics Championships in 2024 and won the 2024 World Athletics U20 Championships.

== Career ==
In August 2020, competing in the under-15 age group category for TSV Bayer 04, he cleared 4.20 metres to win the Pole Vault Germany Cup, a meeting organised in Germany following the cancelation of numerous competitions due to the coronavirus pandemic.

He competed at the 2022 European Athletics U18 Championships in Jerusalem, Israel, and came fifth overall, but shortly afterwards won the German Athletics U20 Championships in Ulm, in which he cleared a height of 5.15 metres.

He won the German Youth Indoor Championships pole vault competition in February 2023, with a personal best clearance of 5.40 metres. He was selected for the 2023 European Athletics U20 Championships but he was affected by a bout of chickenpox just prior to the event.

He cleared a height of 5.20 metres to finish runner-up to Bo Kanda Lita Baehre at the senior German Athletics Championships in June 2024. The following week, he cleared 5.35 metres to win the German U23 Athletics Championships in July 2024.

He won the pole vault competition at the 2024 World Athletics U20 Championships in Lima, Peru, in August 2024, with a clearance of 5.45 metres. The following month he was nominated for the European Athletics Rising Star award. He was also named the German Athletics Association Youth Athlete of the Year for 2024.

== Personal life ==
He was born and raised in Leverkusen. He took part in gymnastics as a youngster before focusing on athletics with the pole vault under the coaching of Marvin Klaassen from the age of 11 yesrs-old at TSV Bayer 04. He began basic training as a sports soldier with the German Armed Forces from 1 November 2024.
