= Simen Guttormsen =

Norwegian pole vaulter (born 2001)

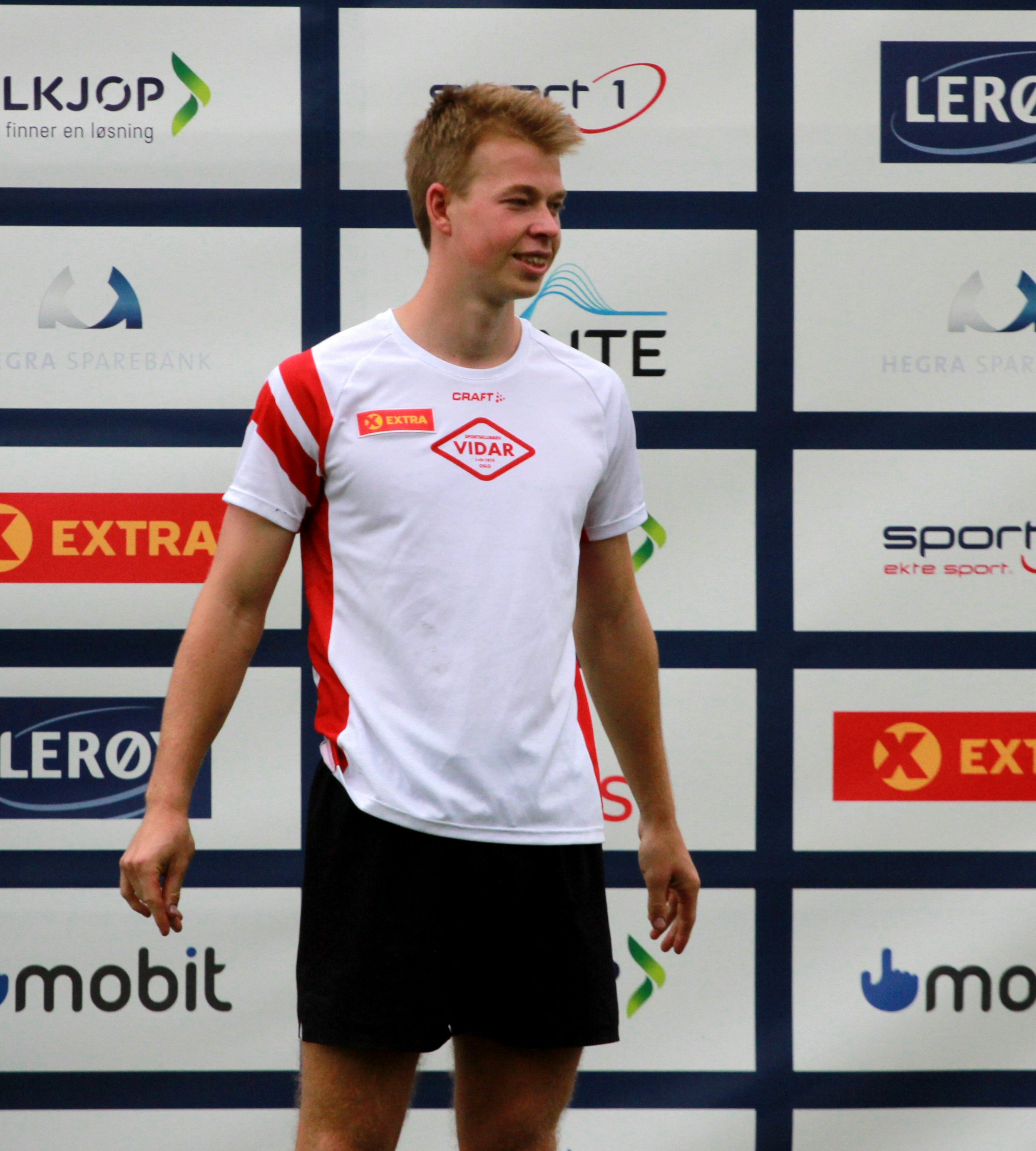
- Guttormsen at the 2022 Norwegian Indoor Athletics Championships

Personal information
- Nationality: Norway
- Born: 19 January 2001 (age 25)
- Home town: Ski, Norway
- Education: Davis Senior High School; Princeton University; Duke University
- Height: 1.81 m (5 ft 11 in)
- Weight: 161 lb (73 kg)
- Relative: Sondre Guttormsen (brother)

Sport
- Sport: Athletics
- Event: Pole vault
- College team: Princeton Tigers Duke Blue Devils

Achievements and titles
- National finals: 2018 Norwegian Champs; • Pole vault, 9th; 2019 Norwegian Indoors; • Pole vault, 3rd (bronze); 2019 Norwegian Ind. U20s; • 60m hurdles, 6th; • Pole vault, 1st (gold); 2019 Norwegian Champs; • Pole vault, 4th; 2020 Norwegian U20s; • Pole vault, 2nd (silver); 2020 Norwegian Champs; • Pole vault, 3rd (bronze); 2021 Norwegian U23s; • Pole vault, 1st (gold); 2021 Norwegian Champs; • Pole vault, 1st (gold); 2022 NCAA Indoors; • Pole vault, 4th; 2022 NCAAs; • Pole vault, 4th; 2022 Norwegian Champs; • Pole vault, 3rd (bronze); 2023 NCAAs; • Pole vault, NH; 2023 Norwegian Champs; • Pole vault, 3rd (bronze); 2023 Norwegian U23s; • Pole vault, 1st (gold); 2024 NCAAs; • Pole vault, 3rd (bronze); 2024 Norwegian Champs; • Pole vault, 1st (gold); 2024 Olympics; • Pole vault, 15th; 2025 NCAA Indoors; • Pole vault, 1st (gold)
- Personal bests: Pole vault; • Outdoor: 5.75m (2025); • Indoor: 5.80m (2026)
Medal record
World University Games
Gold medal – first place	2025 Bochum	Pole vault
- Updated on 4 August 2025

Simen Guttormsen (born 19 January 2001) is a Norwegian Olympic pole vaulter. He graduated from Princeton University before earning his Master's Degree in economics and computer science from Duke University. He was the NCAA 2025 Indoor Champion in the pole vault, in addition to being the Indoor ACC Champion, ACC Meet Record Holder, and Indoor ACC Record Holder. Guttormsen also won the Outdoor ACC title in 2024 and 2025. A multiple time All-American, he placed third at the outdoor NCAA Championships in 2024, and fifth in 2025.

== Career ==
Simen Guttormsen first gained international experience in 2018 when he competed at the 2018 European Athletics U18 Championships in Győr, where he was eliminated in the qualification rounds with a clearance of 4.55 m. The following year, he reached the final at the 2019 European Athletics U20 Championships in Borås, but failed at his chosen starting height. That same year, he also began competing on the Princeton Tigers track and field team. In 2021, he failed to make a valid attempt in the qualifying round at the 2021 European Athletics U23 Championships in Tallinn.

In 2021, Guttormsen won the Norwegian Athletics Championships pole vault, his first senior national title. He got his second national title in the Norwegian Athletics Championship in 2024.

He missed qualifying for the final at the 2022 World Athletics Championships in Eugene with a height of 5.65 m. He also was eliminated in the qualifying round with a height of 5.50 m at the 2022 European Athletics Championships in München in August.

In 2024 Simen competed in the European championship in Rome where he was eliminated in the qualifying round. Later the same year he competed in the 2024 Paris Olympics placing 15 in the qualifying round.

At the 2025 NCAA Division I Indoor Track and Field Championships, Guttormsen won the national title with a new indoor PB of 5.71 m.

== Personal life ==
Guttormsen is from Ski, Norway, and his father Atle Guttormsen claims that he can trace his family lineage back to the 17th century. He was introduced to the pole vault at 4 years old. Though his father was a hurdler, both Guttormsen and his older brother Sondre are pole vaulters. Before his collegiate career at Princeton University, Guttormsen attended Davis Senior High School in California.

== Statistics ==
=== Personal bests ===
Event	Mark	Place	Competition	Venue	Date
Pole vault (indoors)	5.80 m	3rd place, bronze medalist(s)	ORLEN Copernicus Cup	Toruń, Poland	22 February 2026
Pole vault (outdoors)	5.75 m	1st place, gold medalist(s)	FISU World University Games	Bochum, Germany	27 July 2025
