= Márton Böndör =

Hungarian athlete (born 2002)

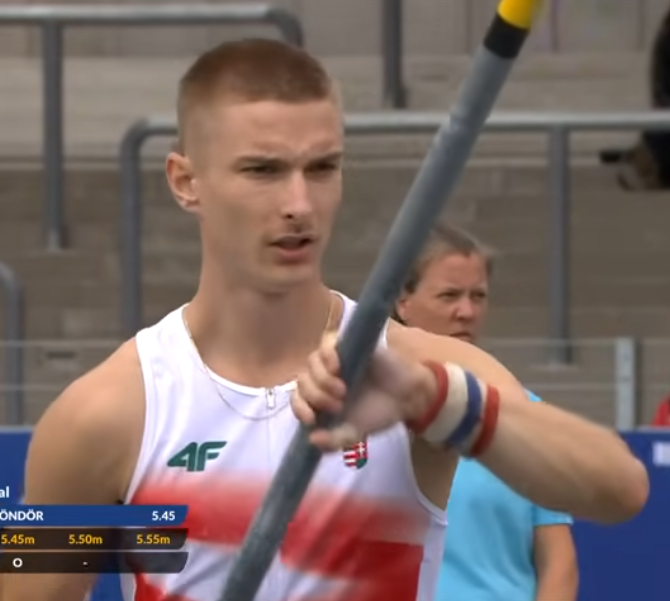
- At the 2025 World University Games

Personal information
- Nationality: Hungarian
- Born: 19 January 2002 (age 24)

Sport
- Sport: Athletics
- Event: Pole vault

Achievements and titles
- Personal best(s): Pole Vault: 5.70 m (Madrid, 2025)
Medal record
Men's athletics
Representing Hungary
Summer World University Games
Bronze medal – third place	2025 Bochum	Pole vault

Márton Böndör (born 19 January 2002) is a Hungarian pole vaulter. He is a multiple-time national champion.

== Career ==
He is a member of Atlétikai Club Bonyhád in Bonyhád, Hungary, where he is coached by his brother, Daniel Böndör.

In February 2023, he won the Hungarian Indoor Athletics Championships in Nyíregyháza. In July 2023, he won the national outdoor title at the 2023 Hungarian Athletics Championships in Budapest.

In February 2024, he retained his ingrain indoor national title. In June 2024, he retained his Hungarian national outdoor title in Budapest, with a jump of 5.32 metres.

He represented Hungary at the 2025 European Athletics Team Championships First Division in Madrid, where he cleared a lifetime best of 5.70 metres to place third overall, despite entering the competition with the second-to-last personal best out of all the athletes. The clearance also placed him into second on the Hungarian all-time list. He won the bronze medal at the 2025 Summer World University Games in Germany.

He cleared 5.50 metres to win the 2025 Hungarian Championships in Budapest. He competed at the 2025 World Athletics Championships in Tokyo, Japan, in September 2025, without advancing to the final.

Böndör cleared 5.42 metres to win the pole vault title at the 2026 Hungarian Indoor Championships in Nyíregyháza.
