= Baptiste Thiery =

French pole vaulter (born 2001)

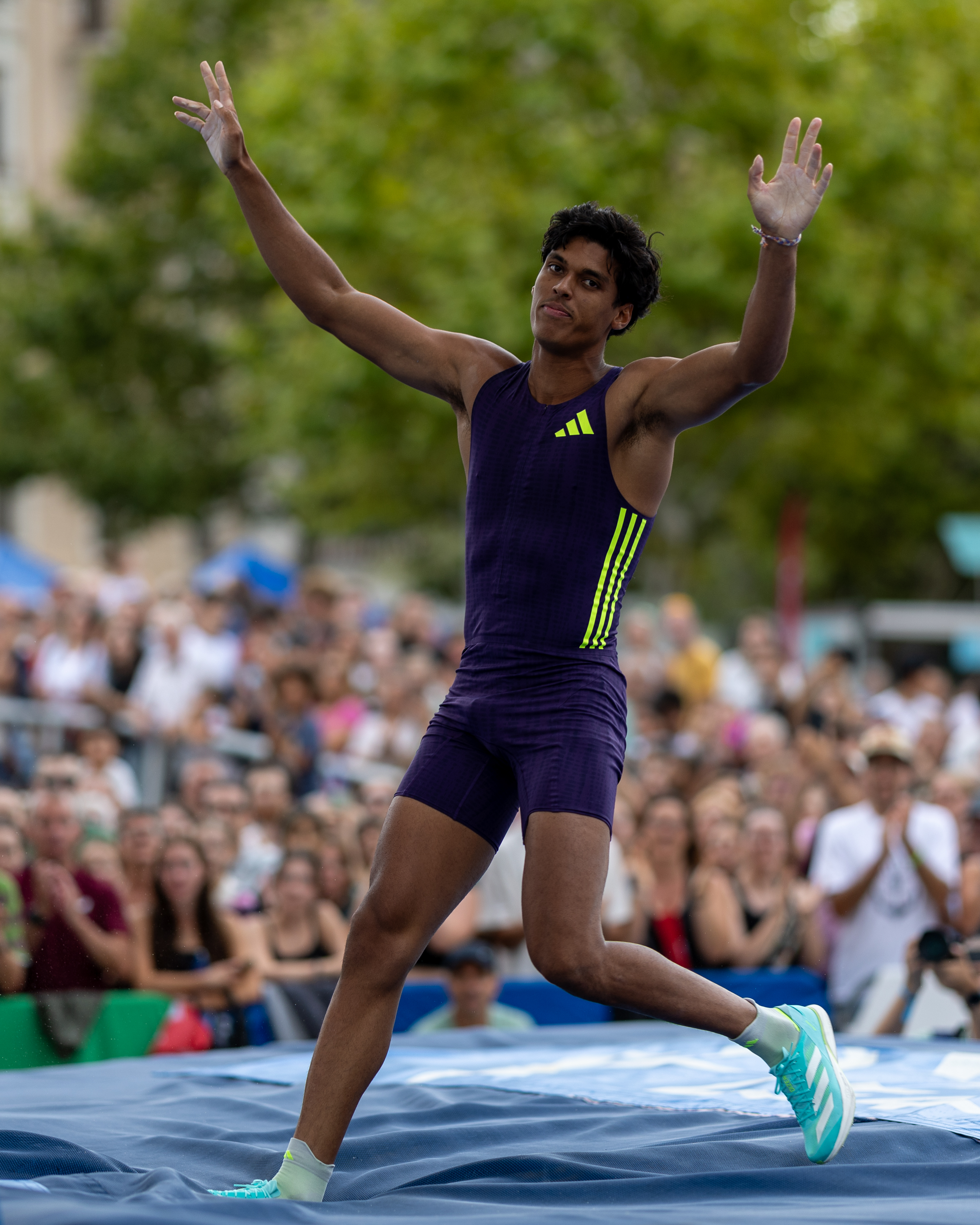
- Baptiste Thiery at the 2026 Wanda Diamond League Athletissima athletics competition.

Personal information
- Born: 29 June 2001 (age 25) Lille, France

Sport
- Country: France
- Sport: Track and field
- Event: Pole vault
Medal record
Representing France
European Championships
Bronze medal – third place	2026 Birmingham	Pole vault
Summer Youth Olympics
Gold medal – first place	2018 Buenos Aires	Pole vault
European U18 Championships
Silver medal – second place	2018 Győr	Pole vault
Representing Martinique
CARIFTA Games
Gold medal – first place	2018 Nassau	Pole vault
Gold medal – first place	2019 George Town	Pole vault
Silver medal – second place	2017 Willemstad	Pole vault

Baptiste Thiery (born 29 June 2001) is a French pole vaulter. He is a two-gold gold medalist in the men's pole vault event at the CARIFTA Games.

In 2018, he won the gold medal in the boys' pole vault event at the Summer Youth Olympics held in Buenos Aires, Argentina.

At the 2018 European Athletics U18 Championships held in Győr, Hungary, he won the silver medal in the men's pole vault event. In the same year, he also won the gold medal in the men's pole vault at the 2018 CARIFTA Games held in Nassau, Bahamas. He was the European Athlete of the Month for the month October 2018.

In 2019, he repeated his previous success at the CARIFTA Games with a second gold medal in his event, at the 2019 CARIFTA Games in George Town, Cayman Islands.
