= Matvei Volkov =

Belarusian pole vaulter

Personal information
- National team: Belarus
- Born: 13 March 2004 (age 22)
- Parent: Konstantin Volkov (father)

Sport
- Country: Belarus
- Sport: Athletics
- Event: Pole vault

Achievements and titles
- Personal best: 6.01 m (19 ft 8 1/2 in) (Mogilev 2026)
Medal record
World U20 Championships
Gold medal – first place	2021 Nairobi	Pole vault

Matvei Volkov (born 13 March 2004) is a Belarusian athlete who specializes in the pole vault. He was the gold medalist at the World Athletics U20 Championships in 2021. On February 20, 2026, he jumped a personal record of 6.01 meters, becoming the second Belarusian to join the six meter club.
