= Simone Bertelli =

Italian athlete (born 2004)

Personal information
- Born: 25 October 2004 (age 21)

Sport
- Sport: Athletics
- Event: Pole vault

Achievements and titles
- Personal bests: Pole vault: 5.70 m (Bergen, 2025)
Medal record
Men's athletics
Representing Italy
European U23 Championships
Gold medal – first place	2025 Bergen	Pole Vault
European U20 Championships
Gold medal – first place	2023 Jerusalem	Pole Vault

Simone Bertelli (born 25 October 2004) is an Italian pole vaulter. He has won senior Italian national titles both indoors and outdoors, and has won European titles at under-20 and under-23 level and competed at the 2025 World Athletics Championships.

== Career ==
From Turin, he is coached by Riccardo Frati and is a member of Safatletica Piemonte. He became the Italian junior champion in the pole vault in Grosseto in 2022.

Bertelli cleared 5.51 metres to set a new Italian under-20 pole vault record, in Ancona in February 2023. The record surpassed the previous best by Andrea Giannini of 5.50m, set in September 1995. He retained his Italian junior championships title in July 2023. He then won the senior Italian Athletics Championships in July 2023. The following month, he won the gold medal at the 2023 European Athletics U20 Championships in Jerusalem, Israel.

Bertelli won the senior Italian Indoor Athletics Championships in February 2024 in Ancona. He competed at the 2024 European Athletics Championships in Rome, without advancing to the final.

Bertelli won the gold medal at the 2025 European Athletics U23 Championships in Bergen, Norway in July 2025 with a lifetime best clearance of 5.70 metres. He competed at the 2025 World Athletics Championships in Tokyo, Japan, in September 2025, without advancing to the final.

A clearance of 5.60m was enough for tied second place with Valentin Lavillenie behind Keaton Daniel on countback at the StarPerche World Athletics Indoor Tour Bronze meeting in Bordeaux in January 2026.

== National titles ==
Bertelli won three national championships at senior level.

- Italian Athletics Championships
  - Pole vault: 2023
- Italian Athletics Indoor Championships
  - Pole vault: 2024, 2026 (2)

== See also ==
- Italian all-time lists - Pole vault
