= Pedro Buaró =

Portuguese athlete

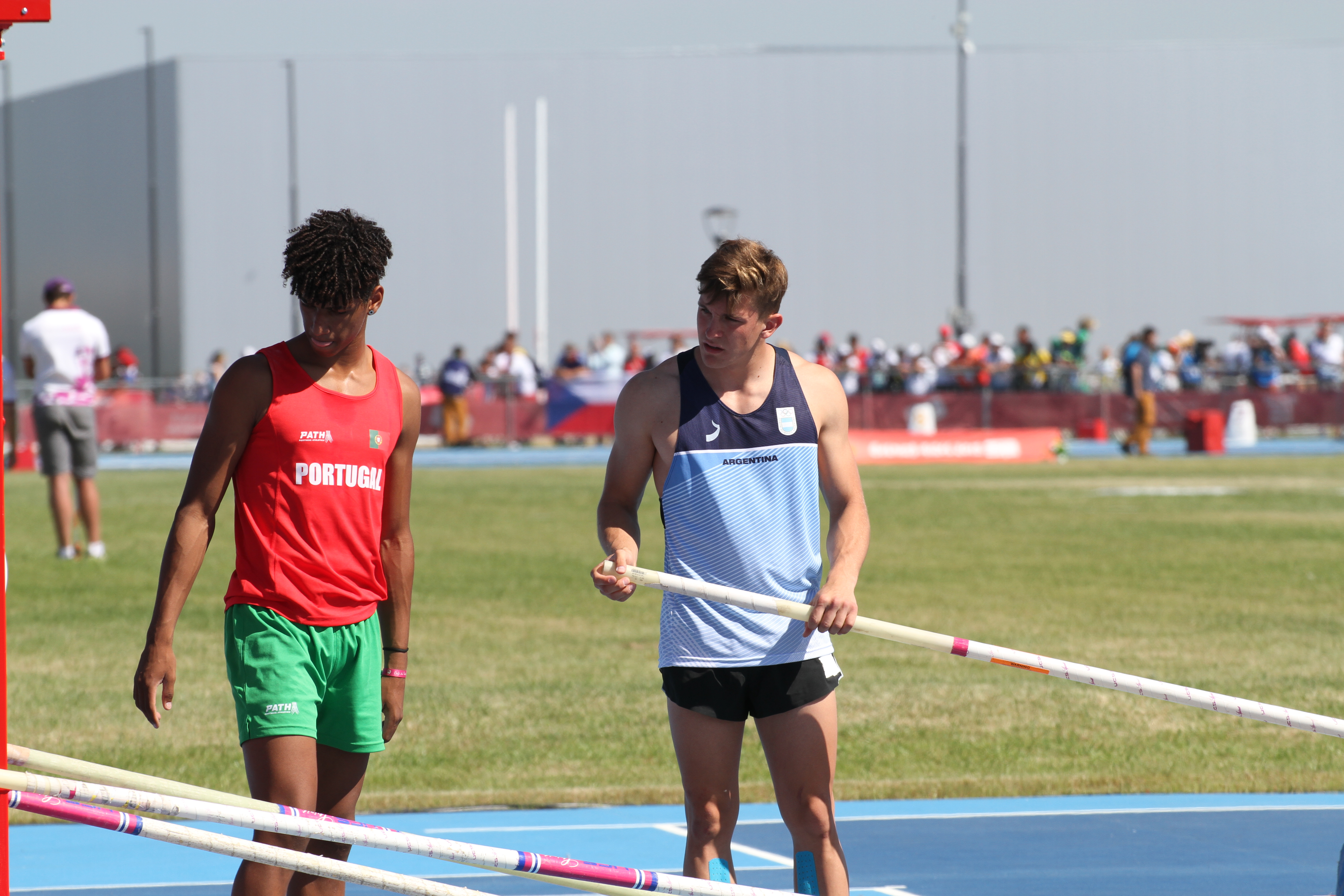
- Buaró (left) in 2018

Personal information
- Full name: João Pedro Rodrigues Buaró
- Born: 14 June 2001 (age 24) Câmara de Lobos, Portugal

Sport
- Sport: Athletics
- Event: Pole vault
- Club: S.L. Benfica

João Pedro Rodrigues Buaró (born 14 June 2001) is a Portuguese pole vaulter. He finished tied for 26th at the 2023 World Athletics Championships. In February 2024, he qualified for the 2024 Summer Olympics.

His personal bests in the pole vault are 5.82 metres indoors, set in February 2023 in Pombal, Portugal, and 5.75 metres outdoors, set in January 2024 in Dévoluy, France. Both of these are the Portuguese national record.
