= Anthony Ammirati =

French pole vaulter (born 2003)

Personal information
- Born: 16 July 2003 (age 23) Grasse, France
- Height: 180 cm (5 ft 11 in)
- Weight: 76 kg (168 lb)

Sport
- Country: France
- Sport: Athletics
- Event: Pole Vault

Achievements and titles
- Personal best: Outdoor: 5.81m (2022) NU20R
Medal record
World U20 Championships
| Gold medal – first place | 2022 Cali | Pole vault |
European U20 Championships
| Gold medal – first place | 2021 Tallinn | Pole vault |

Anthony Ammirati (born 16 July 2003) is a French athlete who specializes in pole vaulting. He was the gold medalist at the World Athletics U20 Championships in 2022.

== Career ==
In June 2021, he set a new national record under-20 with 5.72 metres (18.8 ft) in Salon-de-Provence. The following month, he won the gold medal at the U20 European championships in Tallinn with a jump of 5.64m.

During the U20 world championships in Cali, he became world champion with a jump of 5.65 metres (18.5 ft) at his second attempt. He then improved his personal best with 5.75 metres (18.9 ft). On August 31, 2022, he broke the French junior pole vault record for the third time in Sankt-Wendel with a jump of 5.81 metres (19.1 ft). He became the second performer in the history of the category behind Armand Duplantis, who vaulted 6.05 metres (19.8 ft) in 2018.

Ammirati qualified for the 2024 Summer Olympics; however, he failed to advance to the finals. Subsequently, a video of one of his attempts where he knocked down the crossbar with his penis went viral. Following this, he was offered $250,000 by the Vice President of the pornographic website CamSoda to create a webcam show. Ammirati was listed by Variety as one of the most viral athletes of the 2024 Summer Olympics, alongside Yusuf Dikeç and Stephen Nedoroscik.

== Records ==
Personal records
| Event | | Height | Place | Date |
|---|---|---|---|---|
| Pole Vault | Outdoor | 5.81 m | Sankt Wendel | 31 August 2022 |
| Pole Vault | Indoor | 5.45 m | Nantes | 20 February 2022 |
