= Oleksandr Onufriyev =

Ukrainian athlete (born 2002)

Personal information
- Nationality: Ukrainian
- Born: 15 February 2002 (age 24)

Sport
- Sport: Athletics
- Event: Pole vault

Achievements and titles
- Personal bests: Pole Vault: 5.73 m (Aosta, 2026)
Medal record
Men's athletics
Representing Ukraine
European U20 Championships
Bronze medal – third place	2021 Tallinn	Pole vault

Oleksandr Volodymyrovych Onufriyev (Ukrainian: Олекса́ндр Володи́мирович О́нуфрієв; born 15 February 2002) is a Ukrainian pole vaulter. He is a multiple-time Ukrainian national champion, winning both indoors and outdoors.

== Biography ==
He was a bronze medalist in the pole vault competition at the 2021 European Athletics U20 Championships in Tallinn.

In February 2023, he won the pole vault competition at the Ukrainian Indoor Athletics Championships with a height of 5.50 metres in Kyiv.

He was a silver medalist at the 2024 Balkan Athletics Indoor Championships in Istanbul. In June 2024, he won the pole vault competition at the Ukrainian Athletics Championships in Lviv with a clearance of 5.60 metres.

He won the Ukrainian Indoor Athletics Championships in February 2025 with a clearance of 5.45 metres in Kyiv. He represented Ukraine at the 2025 European Athletics Team Championships First Division in Madrid, where he cleared a lifetime best of 5.70 metres. He competed at the 2025 World Athletics Championships in Tokyo, Japan, in September 2025, without advancing to the final.

In August 2026, he placed fire overall competing at the 2026 European Athletics Championships in Birmingham, England.

== Personal life ==
He is from Dnipro.
