= Matteo Oliveri =

Italian polevaulter (born 2002)

Personal information
- National team: Italy
- Born: 11 November 2002 (age 23) Sanremo, Italy
- Height: 1.84 m (6 ft 0 in)
- Weight: 79 kg (174 lb)

Sport
- Sport: Athletics
- Event: Pole Vault
- Club: Carabinieri Bologna
- Coached by: Mario Botto

Achievements and titles
- Personal bests: Pole vault: 5.71 m (2025); Pole vault indoor: 5.70 m (2025)
Medal record
Men's athletics
Representing Italy
Mediterranean Games
Bronze medal – third place	2026 Taranto	Pole vault

Matteo Oliveri (born 11 November 2002) is an Italian pole vaulter who won three national titles at senior level.

== Achievements ==
Year	Competition	Venue	Rank	Event	Measure	Notes
2021	World U20 Championships	(Kenya) Nairobi	5th	Pole vault	5,20 m	

== Personal bests ==
Outdoor

- Pole vault: 5.71 m ( (Italy) Lucca, 8 June 2025)

Indoor

- Pole vault: 5.70 m ( (Italy) Ancona, 22 February 2025)

== National titles ==
He won four national championships at senior level.

- Italian Athletics Championships
  - Pole vault: 2025
- Italian Athletics Indoor Championships
  - Pole vault: 2022, 2023, 2025 (3)

== See also ==
- Italian all-time lists - Pole vault
