= Owen Heard =

English athlete born 2001

Personal information
- Nationality: British (English)
- Born: 29 December 2001 (age 24) Surrey, England

Sport
- Sport: Athletics
- Event: Pole vault
- Club: Camberley AC
Medal record
Men's athletics
Representing England
Commonwealth Games
Bronze medal – third place	2026 Glasgow	Pole vault

Owen Heard (born 29 December 2001) is a British pole vaulter. He won the bronze medal representing England at the 2026 Commonwealth Games.

== Biography ==
Heard was educated at Loughborough University and in 2022 recorded a jump of 5.45 metres in winning the BoXX United World Athletics Continental Tour pole vault event. He also competes in hurdles events.

In 2022, he represented England for the men's pole vault event at the 2022 Commonwealth Games in Birmingham.

In 2025, he became the British pole vault champion after winning the title at the 2025 UK Athletics Championships. On 1 August 2026, he cleared 5.70 metres to win the bronze medal at the 2026 Commonwealth Games in Glasgow, Scotland.
