= 1914 United States Senate election in Illinois =

- November 3, 1914
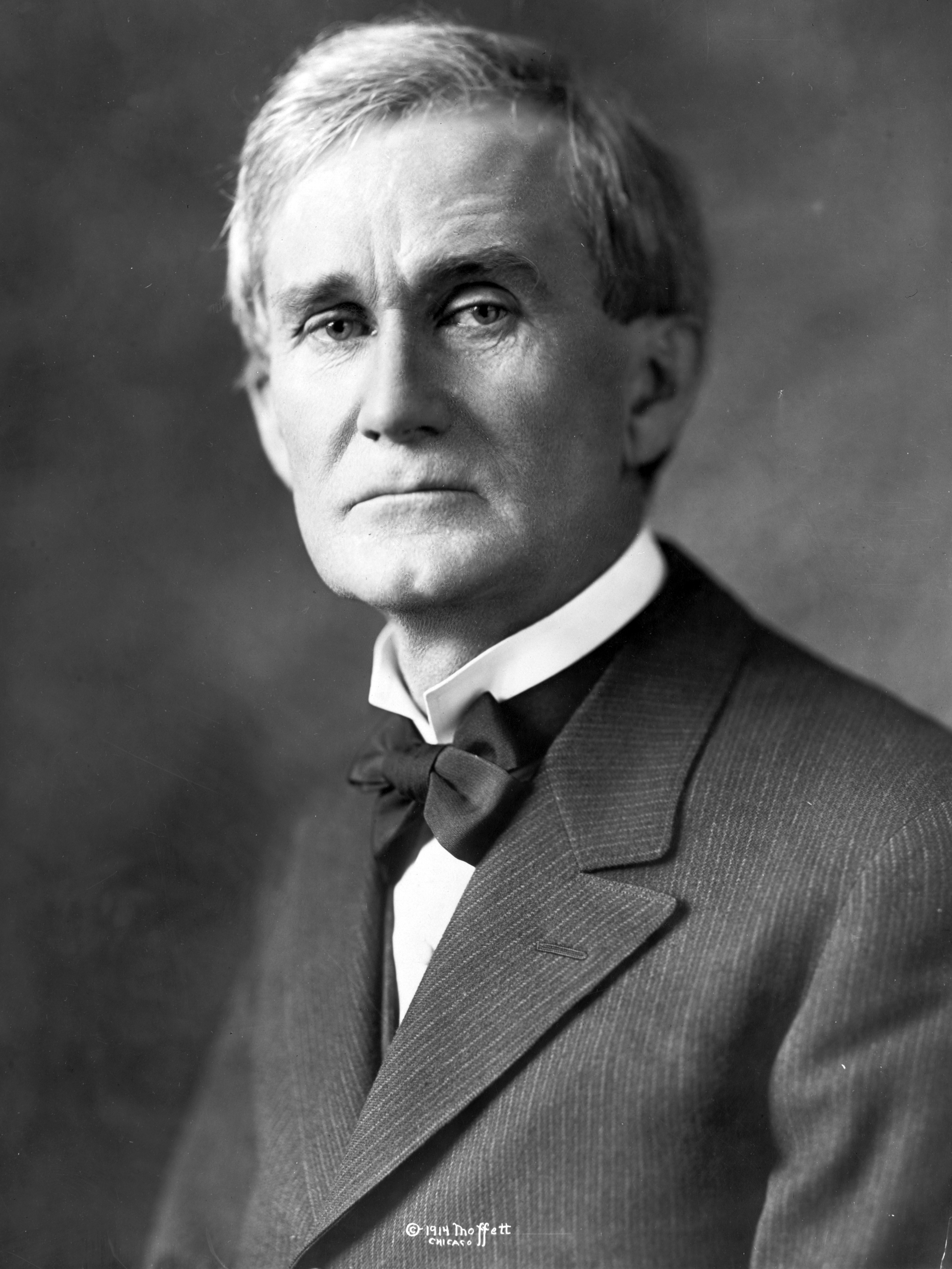

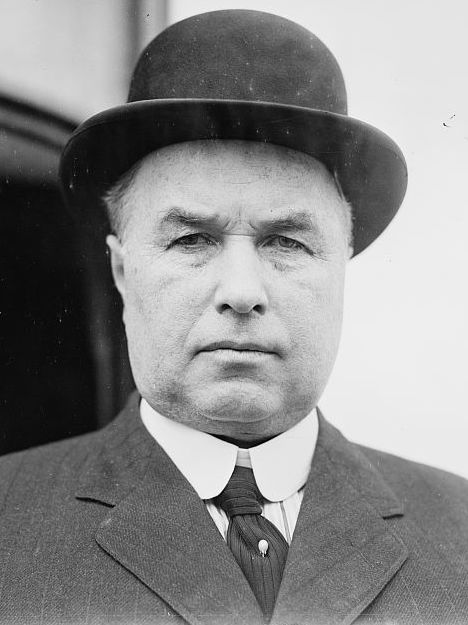

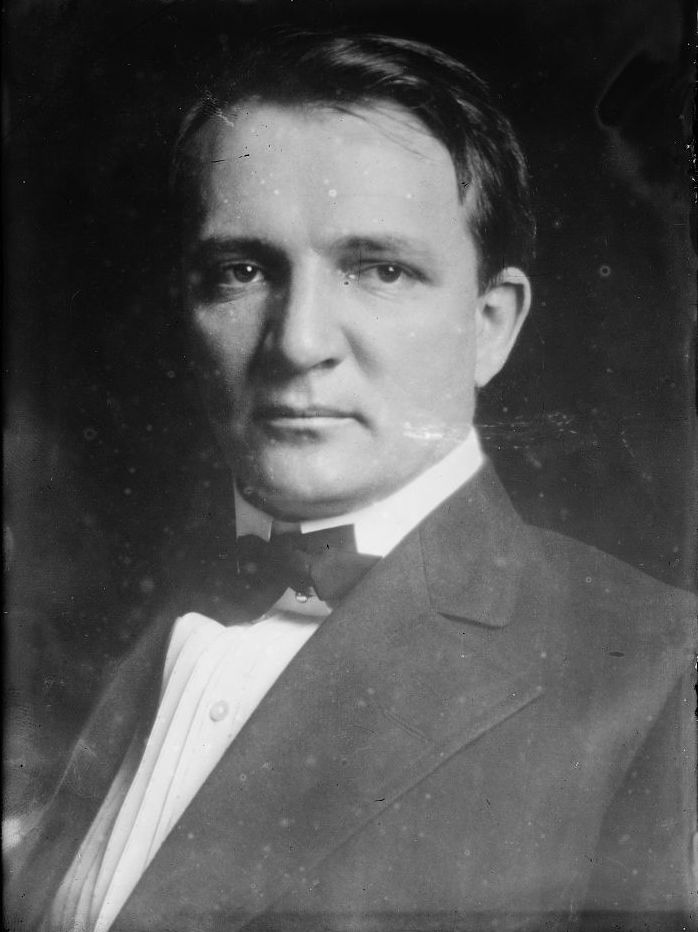
Nominee	Lawrence Yates Sherman	Roger Charles Sullivan	Raymond Robins
Party	Republican	Democratic	Progressive
Popular vote	390,661	373,403	203,027
Percentage	38.46%	36.76%	19.99%
- County results Sherman: 30–40% 40–50% 50–60% 60–70% Sullivan: 30–40% 40–50% 50–60% Robins: 30–40% 40–50% Tie: 40–50%
[[List of United States senators from {{{country}}}|U.S. senator]] before election
Lawrence Yates Sherman
Republican
Elected U.S. senator
Lawrence Yates Sherman
Republican

The 1914 United States Senate election in Illinois took place on November 3, 1914.

Incumbent Republican senator Lawrence Yates Sherman, first elected to a partial term by the Illinois General Assembly in a special election the previous year, was reelected to a full term as U.S. senator by a popular vote.

== Background ==
The primaries and general election coincided with those for House and those for state elections. Primaries were held September 9, 1914.

The 1914 United States Senate elections were the first to be held after the Seventeenth Amendment to the United States Constitution went into effect, and this was therefore the first Illinois U.S. Senate election to be held by a popular vote.

== Democratic primary ==
=== Candidates ===
==== Ran ====
- Barratt O'Hara, lieutenant governor of Illinois
- Lawrence B. Stringer, U.S. congressman
- Roger Charles Sullivan, Cook County Democratic Party political boss and former the clerk of the Cook County Probate Court
- James Traynor
- Harry Woods, Illinois secretary of state

==== Declined to run ====
- Frank D. Comerford, former Illinois state senator and candidate for lieutenant governor in 1912

=== Results ===
Sullivan won the primary.

In October, unsuccessful candidate Woods committed suicide, with his emotional despondency over his loss believed to be the motivating factor.

Democratic primary
Party	Candidate	Votes	%
Democratic	Roger C. Sullivan	141,008	47.42
Democratic	Lawrence B. Stringer	109,923	36.97
Democratic	Harry Woods	24,947	8.39
Democratic	Barratt O'Hara	14,160	4.76
Democratic	James Traynor	7,294	2.45
Total votes		297,332	100

== Republican primary ==
=== Candidates ===
- Frank Hall Childs
- William E. Mason, former U.S. senator
- Lawrence Yates Sherman, incumbent U.S. senator
- Myer J. Stein

=== Results ===
Republican primary
Party	Candidate	Votes	%
Republican	Lawrence Yates Sherman (incumbent)	141,186	65.34
Republican	William E. Mason	51,937	24.04
Republican	Myer J. Stein	11,633	5.38
Republican	Frank Hall Childs	11,321	5.24
Total votes		216,077	100

== Progressive primary ==
=== Candidates ===
- Raymond Robins, economist, writer, and chairman of the Illinois Progressive Party state committee

=== Results ===
Progressive primary
Party	Candidate	Votes	%
Progressive	Raymond Robins	24,953	100
Total votes		24,953	100

== Socialist primary ==
=== Candidates ===
- Adolph Germer, trade union organizer

=== Results ===
Socialist primary
Party	Candidate	Votes	%
Socialist	Adolph Germer	4,220	100
Total votes		4,220	100

== General election ==
=== Candidates ===
- John M. Frances (Socialist Labor)
- Adolph Germer (Socialist), trade union organizer
- Raymond Robins (Progressive), economist, writer, and chairman of the Illinois Progressive Party state committee
- Lawrence Yates Sherman (Republican), incumbent U.S. senator
- Roger Charles Sullivan (Democratic), Cook County Democratic Party political boss and former the clerk of the Cook County Probate Court
- George W. Woolsey (Prohibition Party)

=== Results ===
1914 United States Senate election in Illinois
Party	Candidate	Votes	%
Republican	Lawrence Y. Sherman (incumbent)	390,661	38.46
Democratic	Roger C. Sullivan	373,403	36.76
Progressive	Raymond Robins	203,027	19.99
Socialist	Adolph Germer	39,889	3.93
Prohibition	George W. Woolsey	6,750	0.67
Socialist Labor	John M. Frances	2,078	0.21
Majority		17,258	1.70
Turnout		1,015,808	
Republican hold			

== See also ==
- 1914 United States Senate elections
