= Senator Comerford =

Senator Comerford may refer to:

- Frank D. Comerford (1879–1929), Illinois State Senate
- Jo Comerford (born 1963), Massachusetts State Senate
