= 1916 Illinois lieutenant gubernatorial election =

- November 7, 1916
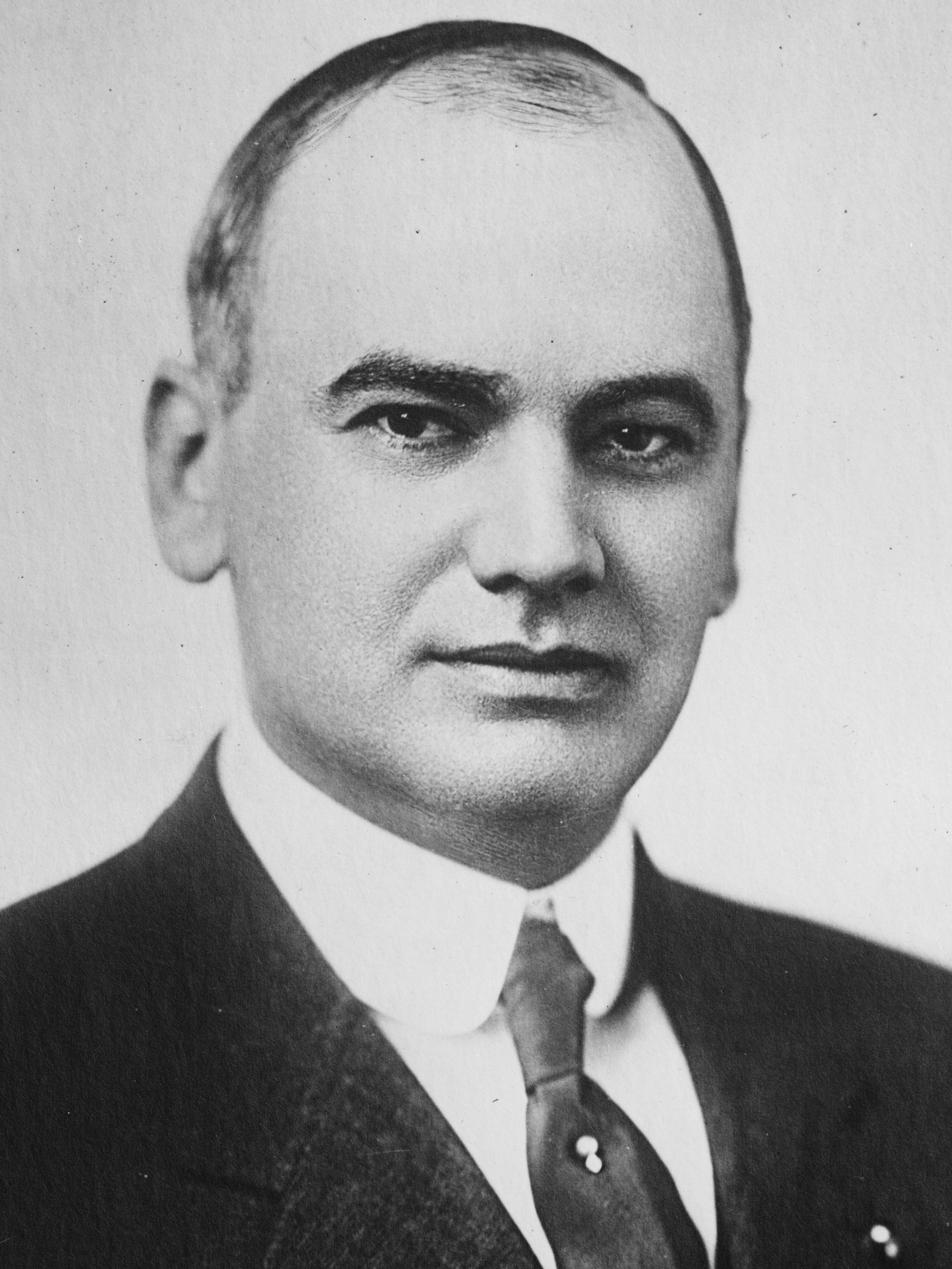

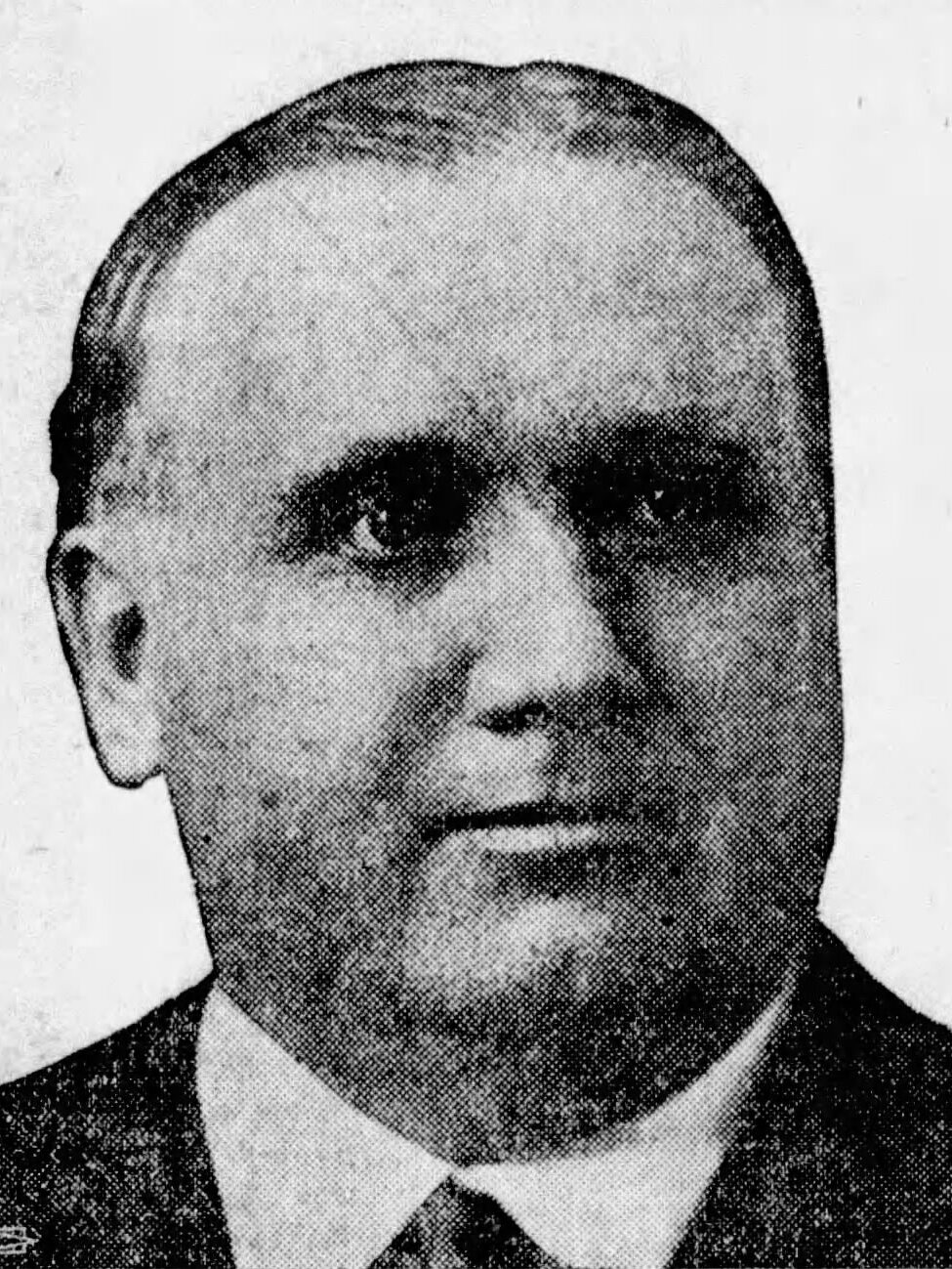
Nominee	John G. Oglesby	Henry W. Huttmann
Party	Republican	Democratic
Popular vote	692,545	555,259
Percentage	52.86%	42.38%
Lieutenant Governor before election
Barratt O'Hara
Democratic
Elected Lieutenant Governor
John G. Oglesby
Republican

The 1916 Illinois lieutenant gubernatorial election was held on November 7, 1916. It saw the election of Republican former governor John G. Oglesby to a second nonconsecutive term.

== Primary elections ==
Primary elections were held on September 13, 1916.

=== Democratic primary ===
==== Candidates ====
- Henry W. Huttmann
- Barratt O'Hara, incumbent lieutenant governor

==== Results ====
Democratic primary results
Party	Candidate	Votes	%
Democratic	Henry W. Huttmann	106,199	51.19
Democratic	Barratt O'Hara (incumbent)	101,279	48.81
Total votes		207,478	100.00

=== Republican primary ===
==== Candidates ====
- William J. Butler
- Frank Hall Childs
- Albert W. Cohn
- Frederick C. DeLang
- Albert Goodman
- Sam W. Latham, incumbent state senator
- John G. Oglesby, former lieutenant governor

==== Results ====
Republican primary results
Party	Candidate	Votes	%
Republican	John G. Oglesby	224,368	61.60
Republican	William J. Butler	40,656	11.16
Republican	Albert Goodman	27,832	7.64
Republican	Sam W. Latham	23,828	6.54
Republican	Frank Hall Childs	21,323	5.85
Republican	Albert W. Cohn	13,852	3.80
Republican	Frederick C. DeLang	12,374	3.40
Total votes		364,233	100.00

=== Progressive primary ===
No candidates stood in the Progressive Party's primary, and the Progressive Party did not field a candidate in the general election.

==== Results ====
Progressive primary results
Party	Candidate	Votes	%
Progressive	Scattering	42	100.00
Total votes		42	100.00

=== Socialist primary ===
==== Candidates ====
- Karl F. M. Sandberg

==== Results ====
Socialist primary results
Party	Candidate	Votes	%
Socialist	Karl F. M. Sandberg	2,793	100.00
Total votes		2,793	100.00

== General election ==
=== Candidates ===
- Harvey A. DuBois, Prohibition, candidate for Illinois secretary of state in 1908
- Henry W. Huttmann, Democratic
- Gustave A. Jennings, Socialist Labor, candidate for governor in 1908
- John G. Oglesby, Republican
- Karl F. M. Sandberg, Socialist

=== Results ===
1916 Illinois lieutenant gubernatorial election
Party	Candidate	Votes	%	±%
Republican	John G. Oglesby	692,545	52.86%	
Democratic	Henry W. Huttmann	555,259	42.38%	
Socialist	Karl F. M. Sandberg	50,176	3.83%	
Prohibition	Harvey A. DuBois	10,569	0.81%	
Socialist Labor	Gustave A. Jennings	1,690	0.13%	
Majority		137,286	10.48%	
Turnout		1,310,239	100.00%	
Republican gain from Democratic		Swing		

== See also ==
- 1916 Illinois gubernatorial election

== Bibliography ==
- Glashan, Roy R. (1979). American Governors and Gubernatorial Elections, 1775-1978. Meckler Books. ISBN 0-930466-17-9.
- Samuel K. Gove, ed. (1959). Illinois Votes 1900-1958: A Compilation of Illinois Election Statistics. Urbana-Champaign, Illinois: University of Illinois.
- Compiled by Louis L. Emmerson, Secretary of State (1917). Official vote of the State of Illinois cast at the General Election, November 7, 1916; Judicial Elections, 1915-1916; Primary Elections, April 11 and September 13, 1916. Springfield, Illinois: Illinois State Journal Co., State Printers.
