= 1908 Illinois lieutenant gubernatorial election =

- November 3, 1908
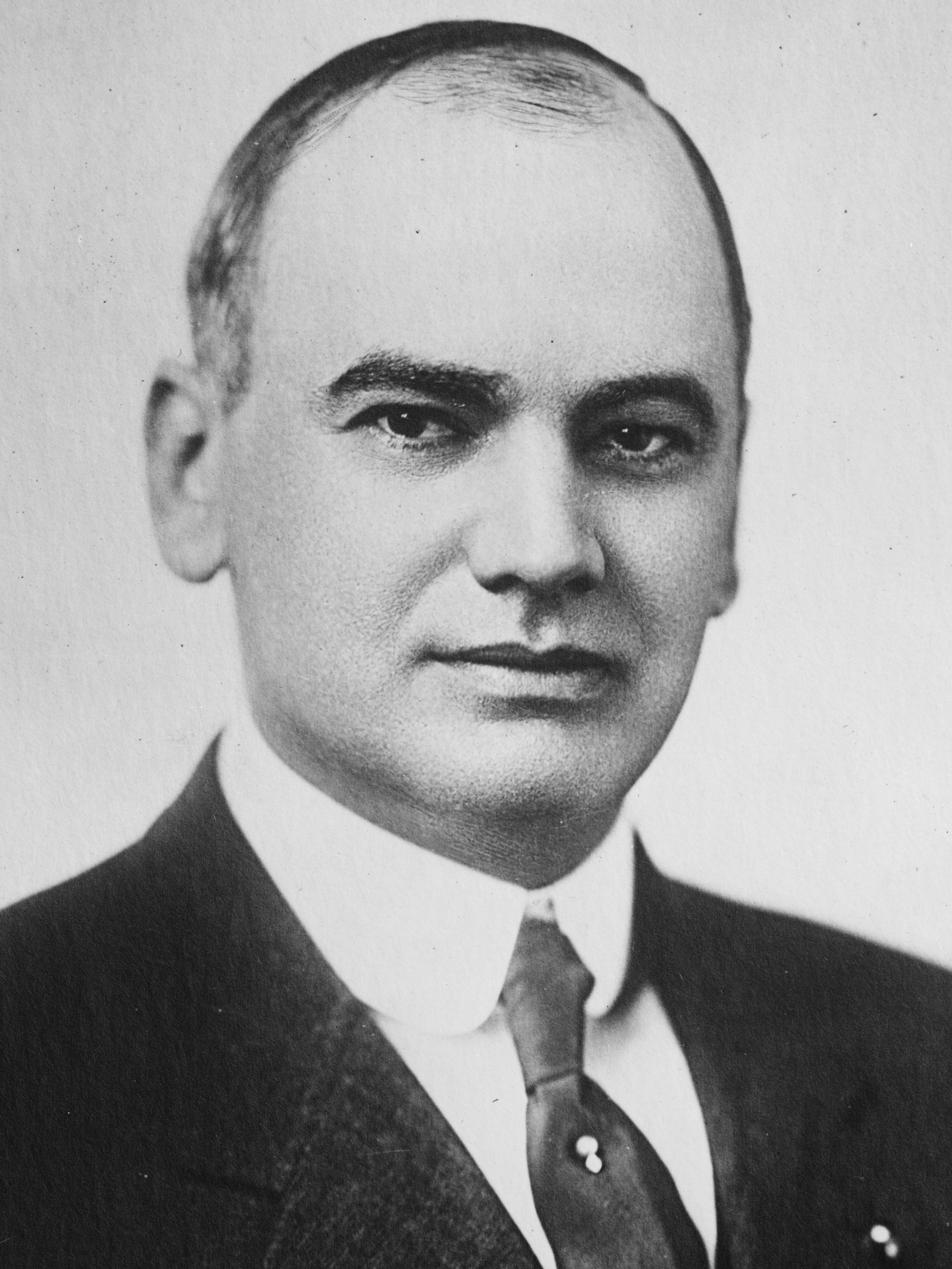

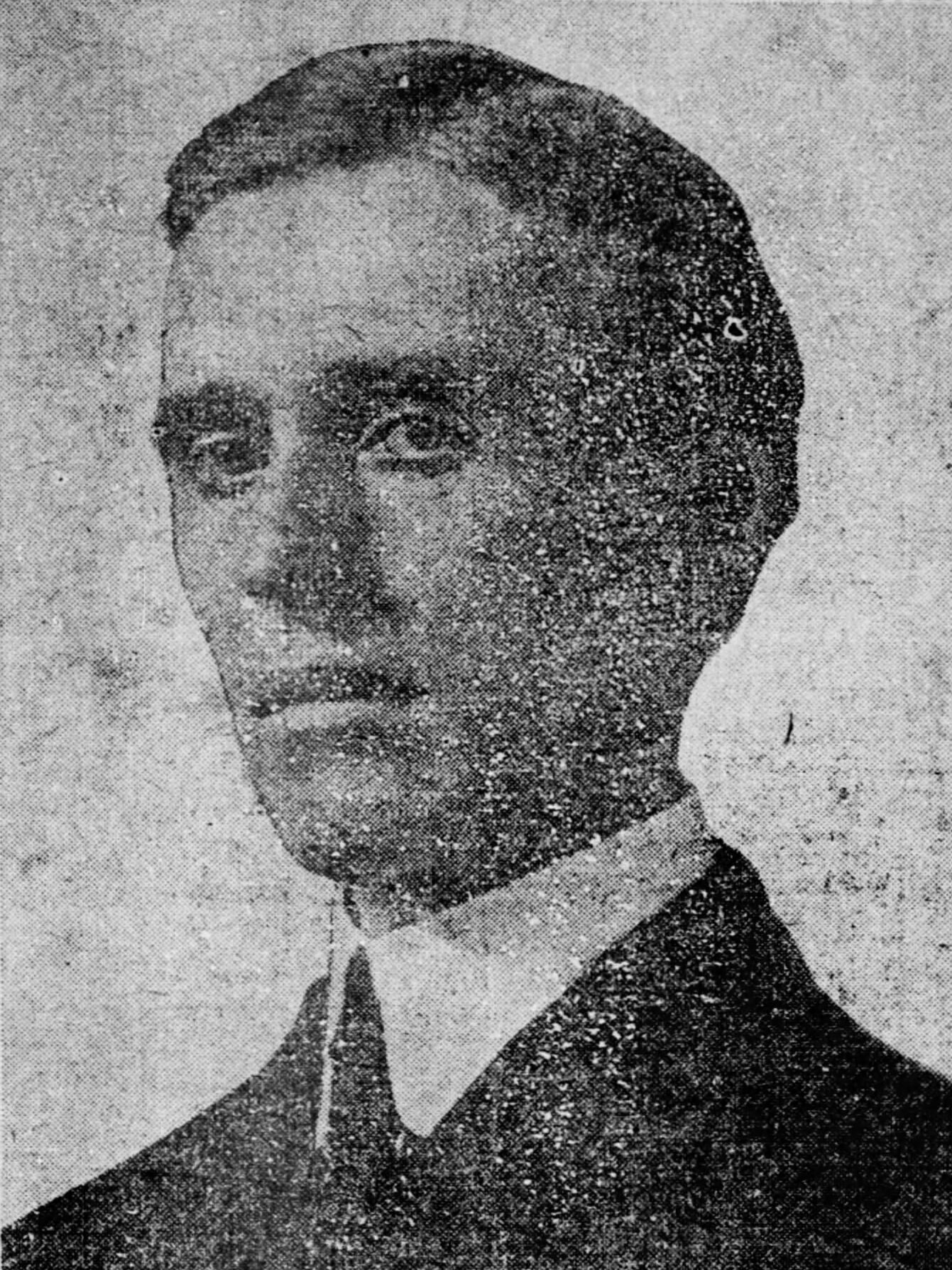
Nominee	John G. Oglesby	Elmer A. Perry
Party	Republican	Democratic
Popular vote	602,357	468,608
Percentage	52.58%	40.91%
Lieutenant Governor before election
Lawrence Y. Sherman
Republican
Elected Lieutenant Governor
John G. Oglesby
Republican

The 1908 Illinois gubernatorial election was held on November 3, 1908. It saw the election of Republican nominee John G. Oglesby.

== Primary elections ==
Primary elections were held on August 8, 1908.

=== Democratic primary ===
==== Candidates ====
- John S. Cuneo
- Elmer A. Perry, Democratic candidate for Lieutenant Governor in 1900

==== Results ====
Democratic primary results
Party	Candidate	Votes	%
Democratic	Elmer A. Perry	97,102	65.22
Democratic	John S. Cuneo	51,772	34.78
Total votes		148,874	100.00

=== Republican primary ===
==== Candidates ====
- Samuel J. Drew, former State Representative
- Thomas D. Knight
- John G. Oglesby, State Representative
- George Shumway
- Frank L. Smith

==== Results ====
Republican primary results
Party	Candidate	Votes	%
Republican	John G. Oglesby	139,924	38.62
Republican	Frank L. Smith	115,979	32.01
Republican	George Shumway	54,378	15.01
Republican	Thomas D. Knight	30,335	8.37
Republican	Samuel J. Drew	21,740	6.00
Total votes		362,356	100.00

=== Prohibition primary ===
==== Candidates ====
- William A. Brubaker, candidate for Mayor of Chicago in 1907
- Jacob H. Hoofstetler

==== Results ====
Prohibition primary results
Party	Candidate	Votes	%
Prohibition	William A. Brubaker	4,920	74.99
Prohibition	Jacob H. Hoofstetler	1,641	25.01
Total votes		6,561	100.00

=== Socialist primary ===
==== Candidates ====
- John Collins, nominee for governor in 1904 and mayor of Chicago in 1901 and 1905

==== Results ====
Socialist primary results
Party	Candidate	Votes	%
Socialist	John Collins	4,435	100.00
Total votes		4,435	100.00

== General election ==
=== Candidates ===
- C. E. Beach, Independence League
- William A. Brubaker, Prohibition
- John Collins, Socialist
- Joseph Kohler, Socialist Labor
- John G. Oglesby, Republican
- Elmer A. Perry, Democratic

=== Results ===
1908 Illinois lieutenant gubernatorial election
Party	Candidate	Votes	%	±%
Republican	John G. Oglesby	602,357	52.58%	
Democratic	Elmer A. Perry	468,608	40.91%	
Socialist	John Collins	33,202	2.90%	
Prohibition	William A. Brubaker	31,588	2.76%	
Independence	C. E. Beach	8,202	0.72%	
Socialist Labor	Joseph Kohler	1,603	0.14%	
Majority		133,749	11.68%	
Turnout		1,145,560	100.00%	
Republican hold		Swing		

== See also ==
- 1908 Illinois gubernatorial election

== Bibliography ==
- Compiled by James A. Rose, Secretary of State (1908). Blue Book of the State of Illinois, 1907-08. Springfield, Illinois: Phillips Bros., State Printers.
- Compiled by James A. Rose, Secretary of State (1909). Blue Book of the State of Illinois, 1909-10. Danville, Illinois: Illinois Printing Company.
- Compiled by James A. Rose, Secretary of State (1908). Official vote of the State of Illinois cast at the General and Special Elections, November 3, 1908. Springfield, Illinois: Illinois State Journal Co., State Printers.
