= 1916 Illinois gubernatorial election =

- November 7, 1916
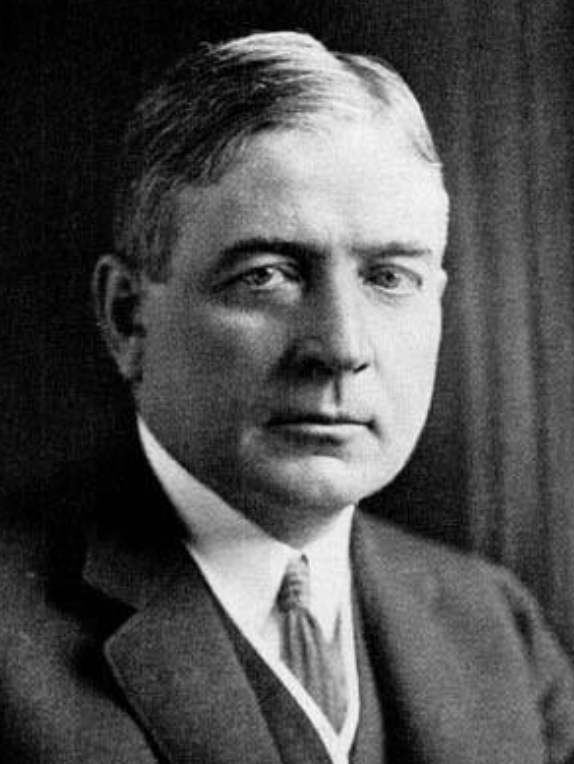

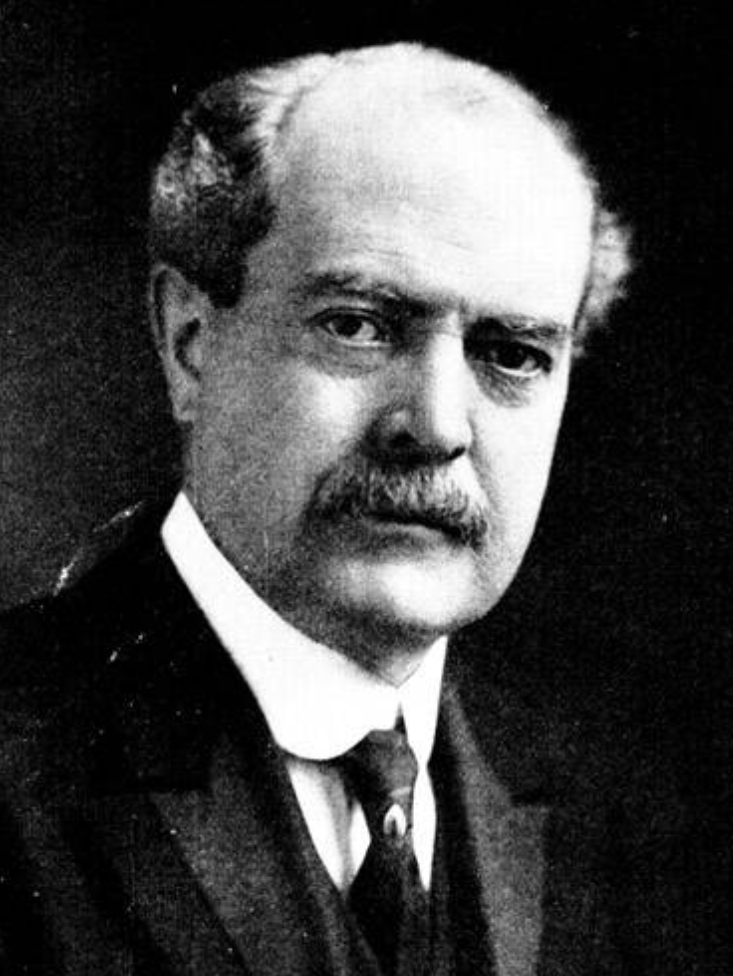
Nominee	Frank Orren Lowden	Edward Fitzsimmons Dunne
Party	Republican	Democratic
Popular vote	696,535	556,654
Percentage	52.67%	42.09%
- County results Lowden: 40–50% 50–60% 60–70% 70–80% Dunne: 40–50% 50–60%
Governor before election
Edward Fitzsimmons Dunne
Democratic
Elected Governor
Frank Orren Lowden
Republican

The 1916 Illinois gubernatorial election was held on November 7, 1916. Incumbent Democratic Governor Edward Fitzsimmons Dunne was defeated by Republican nominee Frank Orren Lowden.

== Primary elections ==
Primary elections were held on September 13, 1916.

=== Democratic primary ===
==== Candidates ====
- William B. Brinton, manufacturer
- Edward Fitzsimmons Dunne, incumbent Governor
- James Traynor

==== Results ====
Democratic primary results
Party	Candidate	Votes	%
Democratic	Edward Fitzsimmons Dunne (incumbent)	151,763	63.63
Democratic	William B. Brinton	65,639	27.52
Democratic	James Traynor	21,105	8.85
Total votes		238,507	100.00

=== Republican primary ===
==== Candidates ====
- Morton D. Hull, State Senator
- Frank Orren Lowden, former U.S. Representative for Illinois's 13th congressional district
- Frank Leslie Smith, unsuccessful candidate for Republican nomination for Lieutenant Governor in 1904

==== Results ====
Republican primary results
Party	Candidate	Votes	%
Republican	Frank Orren Lowden	227,443	54.03
Republican	Morton D. Hull	117,229	27.85
Republican	Frank Leslie Smith	76,287	18.12
Total votes		420,959	100.00

=== Progressive primary ===
No candidates stood in the Progressive primary, and the Progressive Party did not put forward a candidate in the general election.

==== Results ====
Progressive primary results
Party	Candidate	Votes	%
Progressive	Scattering	64	100.00
Total votes		64	100.00

=== Socialist primary ===
==== Candidates ====
- Seymour Stedman, candidate for Mayor of Chicago in 1915

==== Results ====
Socialist primary results
Party	Candidate	Votes	%
Socialist	Seymour Stedman	2,985	100.00
Total votes		2,985	100.00

== General election ==
=== Candidates ===
- Edward Fitzsimmons Dunne, Democratic
- John M. Francis, Socialist Labor, perennial candidate
- John R. Golden, Prohibition, pastor and former state legislator
- Frank Orren Lowden, Republican
- Seymour Stedman, Socialist

=== Results ===
1916 Illinois gubernatorial election
Party	Candidate	Votes	%	±%
Republican	Frank Orren Lowden	696,535	52.67%	
Democratic	Edward Fitzsimmons Dunne (incumbent)	556,654	42.09%	
Socialist	Seymour Stedman	52,316	3.96%	
Prohibition	John R. Golden	15,309	1.16%	
Socialist Labor	John M. Francis	1,739	0.13%	
Majority		139,881	10.58%	
Turnout		1,322,553	100.00%	
Republican gain from Democratic		Swing		

870,154, or 39.7%, fewer votes were cast in the gubernatorial election than in the presidential this year, as Illinois allowed women to vote for presidential electors, but not constitutional offices.

== See also ==
- 1916 Illinois lieutenant gubernatorial election

== Bibliography ==
- Glashan, Roy R. (1979). American Governors and Gubernatorial Elections, 1775-1978. Meckler Books. ISBN 0-930466-17-9.
- Samuel K. Gove, ed. (1959). Illinois Votes 1900-1958: A Compilation of Illinois Election Statistics. Urbana-Champaign, Illinois: University of Illinois.
- Compiled by Louis L. Emmerson, Secretary of State (1917). Official vote of the State of Illinois cast at the General Election, November 7, 1916; Judicial Elections, 1915-1916; Primary Elections, April 11 and September 13, 1916. Springfield, Illinois: Illinois State Journal Co., State Printers.
