= Frank D. Comerford =

American politician

Judge Frank D. Comerford (1879–1929).

Frank D. Comerford (1879–1929) was an American judge, Democratic politician, and author from the state of Illinois. Comerford is best remembered as the victim of expulsion from the Illinois State Senate in February 1905 for allegedly besmirching the name of the legislature when he made specific charges of corruption in that institution at a Chicago lecture. Comerford thus became the first elected official expelled from the Illinois legislature.

== Biography ==
=== Early years ===
Frank D. Comerford was born in September 25, 1879 in Chicago, Illinois. He was the son of Isaac Comerford, a tradesman.

Comerford was a graduate of Northwestern University in Chicago and attended law school at Illinois College of Law. Following graduation he was admitted to the Illinois State Bar in 1904.

=== Election and expulsion ===
The 24-year-old Comerford was elected to the Illinois State Senate in November 1904 from the 2nd district, representing part of Cook County, Illinois.

Although only a member of the Illinois legislature for a few weeks, Comerford made a public speech at the Illinois College of Law in Chicago at which he claimed that body was merely "a great public auction, where special privileges are sold to the highest corporation bidders." Rather than limiting himself to a generalized statement, Comerford continued to make specific accusations of wrongdoing, including names, dates, and financial details, attempting to shield himself by calling these "stories in common circulation at the Capitol."

The Illinois legislature reacted forcefully, quickly passing a resolution which asserted Comerford was spreading "assertions, slanders, insinuations and incriminations" which called into question "the honor and integrity of the Illinois General Assembly." A special committee of the Illinois House of Representatives was hastily established and convened, which took extensive testimony before declaring Comerford's allegations to be unfounded.

On Wednesday, February 8, 1905, the report of the special committee was made before the House and Comerford was called before the bar to show cause as to why he should not be expelled for the accusations which he had levied. Comerford waived the right to a delay for preparation of a defense, instead choosing to deliver an impassioned speech lasting more than an hour, in which he defended the veracity of his charges and severely criticized the investigative committee for the limitations it placed upon his testimony. A vote on Comerford's expulsion immediately followed and the newly elected Senator was expelled by a vote of 121 to 13.

Following his expulsion, a special election was held in the 2nd Senate District to replace Comerford. Unbowed by his previous experience, Comerford ran for the seat again — this time as an independent — and was re-elected by his constituents. He was unsuccessful in an effort to win re-election in the 1906 election, however.

== Tenure as police attorney and pursuits of higher office ==
After losing re-election, he accepted a position as police attorney of Chicago under Democratic mayor Edward Fitzsimmons Dunne.

Comerford ran unsuccessfully in the Democratic primary of the 1912 Illinois lieutenant gubernatorial election, placing a narrow second.

In 1914 the reform Democrat Comerford tested the water with a view of making himself a candidate for the United States Senate. The Democratic party came together around Cook County Democratic Party boss Roger C. Sullivan, however, and Comerford ultimately decided against running for office in the primary.

Following the end of the Dunne administration in January 1917, Comerford left government service to launch a private attorney practice. This interlude was brief, however, as with the outbreak of World War I in the spring of 1917, Comerford attempted to enlist in the military. He was rejected from service due to an unspecified physical infirmity, however, and therefore spent the wartime years as a public speaker selling bonds on behalf of the Liberty Loan program.

=== Anti-Communist author ===
In 1919, following the termination of the war, Comerford traveled to London and Paris for six months, where he examined that rapidly changing social and political situation at first hand and contributed news accounts to the Chicago Tribune. Upon his return to the United States he published a book on the subject, The New World, in which he paid particular attention to the Bolshevik Revolution in Soviet Russia, which he characterized as a new form of minority rule. In this book Comerford characterized Soviet leader V. I. Lenin as a "practical machine politician" and an "oracle-dictator" and observed that legislative, executive, and judicial branches of government had been concentrated in a single set of hands, with no right of appeal.

Comerford vehemently advocated the acceptance by the United States of the proposed League of Nations, noting Bolshevik opposition to the concept and charging that "the failure to establish a League of Nations would be a world tragedy and in its wake may come revolution."

Comerford's political views and legal expertise made him a logical choice as the special prosecutor in the 1920 case of William Bross Lloyd and members of the Communist Labor Party of America. Comerford won convictions of the defendants in that case, who included millionaire heir to the Chicago Tribune fortune William Bross Lloyd, despite the best efforts of defense attorney Clarence Darrow.

=== Election as judge ===
In June 1926, Comerford was elected to the bench as a Superior Court judge in Chicago.

Comerford was twice married — first from 1915 to 1921 to the former Jean Cowgill and then to Lyela Brandeis, widow of an Omaha, Nebraska merchant.

=== Death and legacy ===
In the afternoon of August 29, 1929, Frank Comerford complained of chest pain while at the Chicago home of his brother. Two of his nephews, both medical doctors, were summoned, but neither found anything obviously wrong, however, and he was not hospitalized. At 8:55 pm, Comerford was stricken by a massive heart attack while still being attended by one of his nephews. Comerford died five minutes later. He was 49.

== Works ==
- Plea of Frank Comerford in Defense of Carl E. Person's Life: Made at Lincoln, Illinois, October Fourth, Nineteen Hundred Fourteen. Chicago: Person Defense League of Chicago, Cook County, Illinois, 1915.
- The New World. New York: D. Appleton and Co., 1920.
