= Frank O. Lowden =

American politician (1861–1943)

Frank Orren Lowden
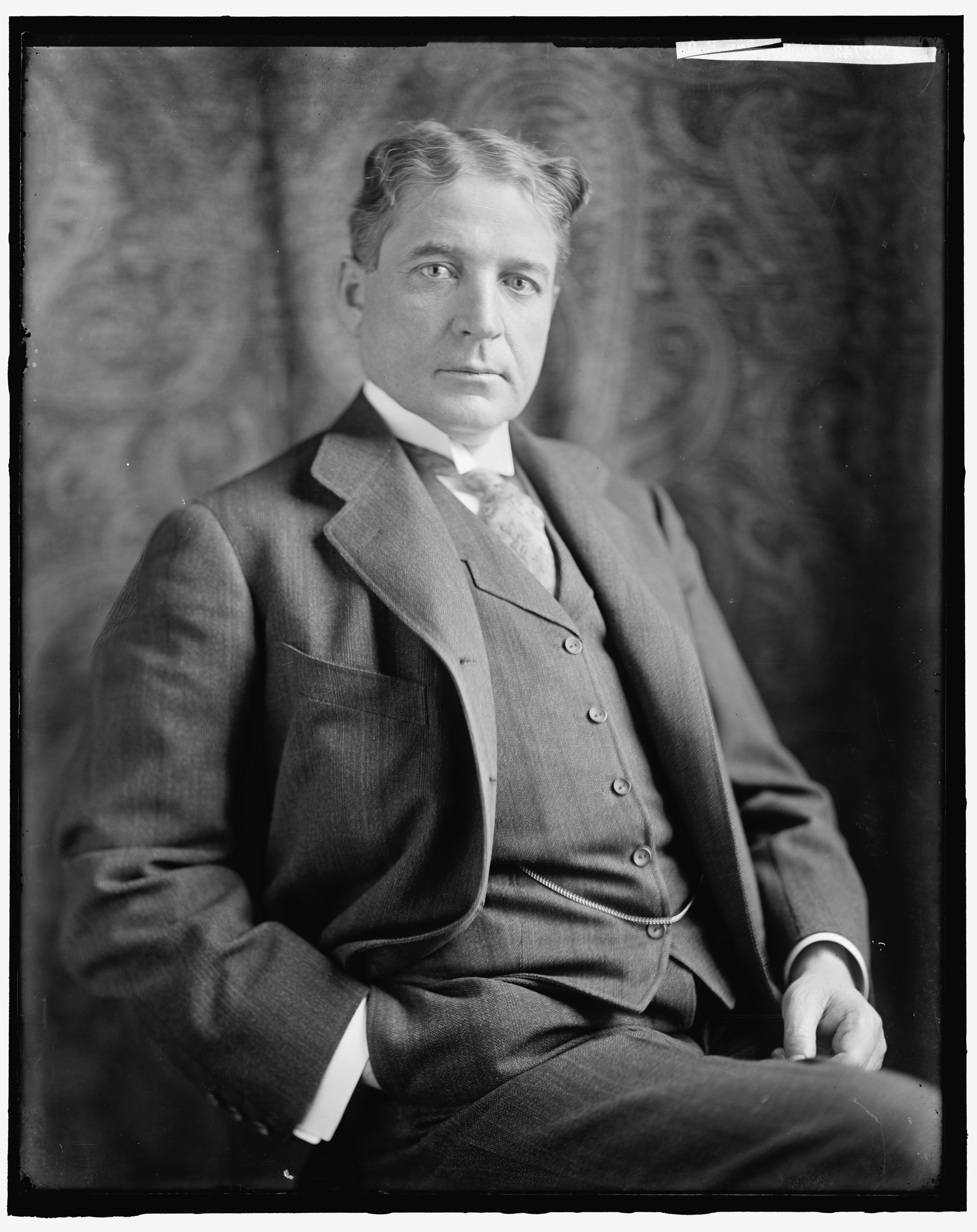
- Lowden, c. 1906–1911

25th Governor of Illinois
- In office January 8, 1917 – January 10, 1921
- Lieutenant: John G. Oglesby
- Preceded by: Edward Fitzsimmons Dunne
- Succeeded by: Len Small

Member of the U.S. House of Representatives from Illinois's 13th district
- In office November 6, 1906 – March 3, 1911
- Preceded by: Robert R. Hitt
- Succeeded by: John C. McKenzie

Personal details
- Born: Frank Orren Lowden; January 26, 1861 Sunrise, Minnesota, U.S.
- Died: March 20, 1943 (aged 82) Tucson, Arizona, U.S.
- Resting place: Graceland Cemetery
- Party: Republican
- Spouse: Florence Pullman (1896–1937)
- Children: 3
- Education: University of Iowa (BA); Northwestern University (LLB)

Military service
- Allegiance: United States
- Branch/service: National Guard
- Years of service: 1898–1903
- Rank: Lieutenant colonel
- Unit: First Regiment Infantry, Illinois National Guard

Frank Orren Lowden (January 26, 1861 – March 20, 1943) was an American Republican Party politician who served as the 25th governor of Illinois and as a United States representative from Illinois. He was also a candidate for the Republican presidential nominations in 1920 and 1928.

Born in Sunrise Township, Minnesota, Lowden practiced law in Chicago after graduating from the University of Iowa. He emerged as a local Republican leader and served in the House of Representatives from 1906 to 1911. He served as Governor of Illinois from 1917 to 1921, earning wide notice for his reorganization of state government and his handling of the Chicago race riot of 1919.

At the 1920 Republican National Convention, Lowden was the preferred candidate of many of the party's conservatives. His supporters coalesced behind Warren G. Harding as a compromise candidate, and Harding won both the nomination and the 1920 presidential election. Lowden was nominated for vice president at the 1924 Republican National Convention, but he declined the nomination. Lowden was a candidate for president at the 1928 Republican National Convention, but Herbert Hoover won the nomination on the first ballot.

== Early life ==
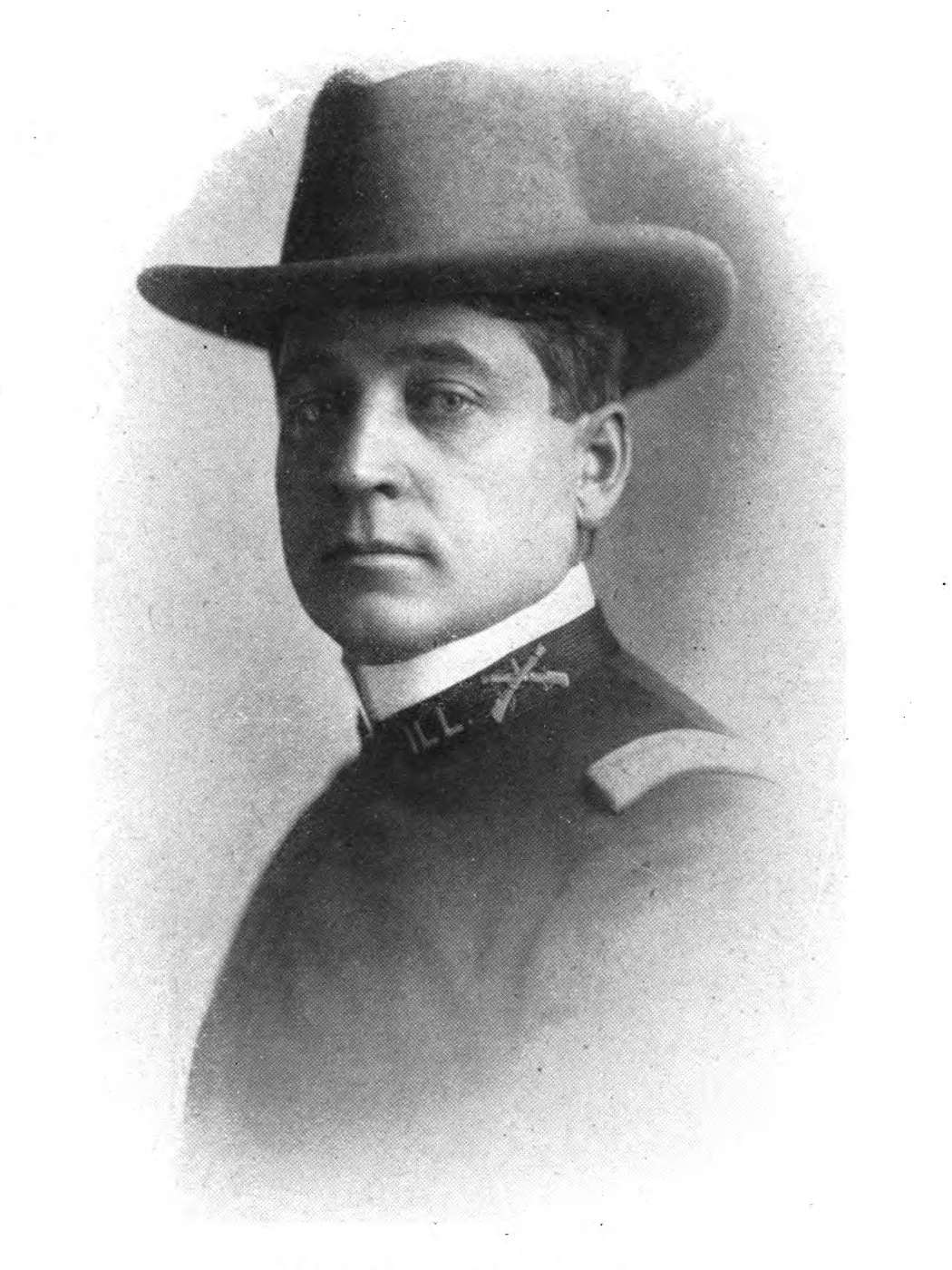
Lowden as lieutenant colonel of the First Regiment Infantry of the Illinois National Guard c. 1898–1903

Lowden was born in Sunrise Township, Minnesota, the son of Nancy Elizabeth (Breg) and Lorenzo Orren Lowden, a blacksmith. He lived in Iowa from the age of seven, on the farm in Hardin County, Iowa, in poverty. It's claimed by Lowden's family that in 1861 his father, Lorenzo, answered one of the first call by the Governor Richard Yates Sr. to get volunteers in the American Civil War and was appointed a major in the Eighty-fourth Minnesota Infantry, but was unable to serve due to varicose veins. There is no contemporary evidence supporting this account, and the existence of such a unit is unverified. Lorenzo Lowden, almost annually during the 1870’s sought some local offices, losing all races, with expection of for the post of clerk of Tipton Township. Frank attended school when chores on the family farm allowed. At age fifteen he began to teach in a one room school house in Hubbard, Iowa. After he became promiment politician, he called him younger self “the plainest of plain folks you ever saw.” After teaching five years, he entered the University of Iowa at twenty, graduating in 1885. He aspired to be a lawyer, but taught high school for a year while learning stenography. That skill got him a job in 1886 at the Dexter law firm in Chicago, and he took evening courses at the Union College of Law, completing the two year curriculum in one year, finishing as valedictorian in 1887. He was admitted to the bar the same year and practiced law in Chicago for about 20 years. His wife, Florence, was the daughter of George Pullman and namesake of the Hotel Florence. In 1898, he enlisted in the Illinois National Guard, rising to the rank of lieutenant colonel of the First Regiment Infantry by 1903. In 1899, he was professor of law at Northwestern University, Evanston, Illinois.

== Political career ==
=== Entry into politics ===
In 1900, Lowden declined the first assistant postmaster-generalship, offered him by President McKinley, whom he had supported. He was a delegate to the Republican National Convention in 1900 and 1904, and from 1904 to 1912 was a member of the Republican National Committee. He was also a member of the executive committee in 1904 and 1908.

Lowden was elected a U.S. Representative from Illinois in 1906 to fill the unexpired term of Robert R. Hitt, deceased. He was re-elected for succeeding terms until 1911, when he declined to run for another term.

=== Governor of Illinois (1917–1921) ===
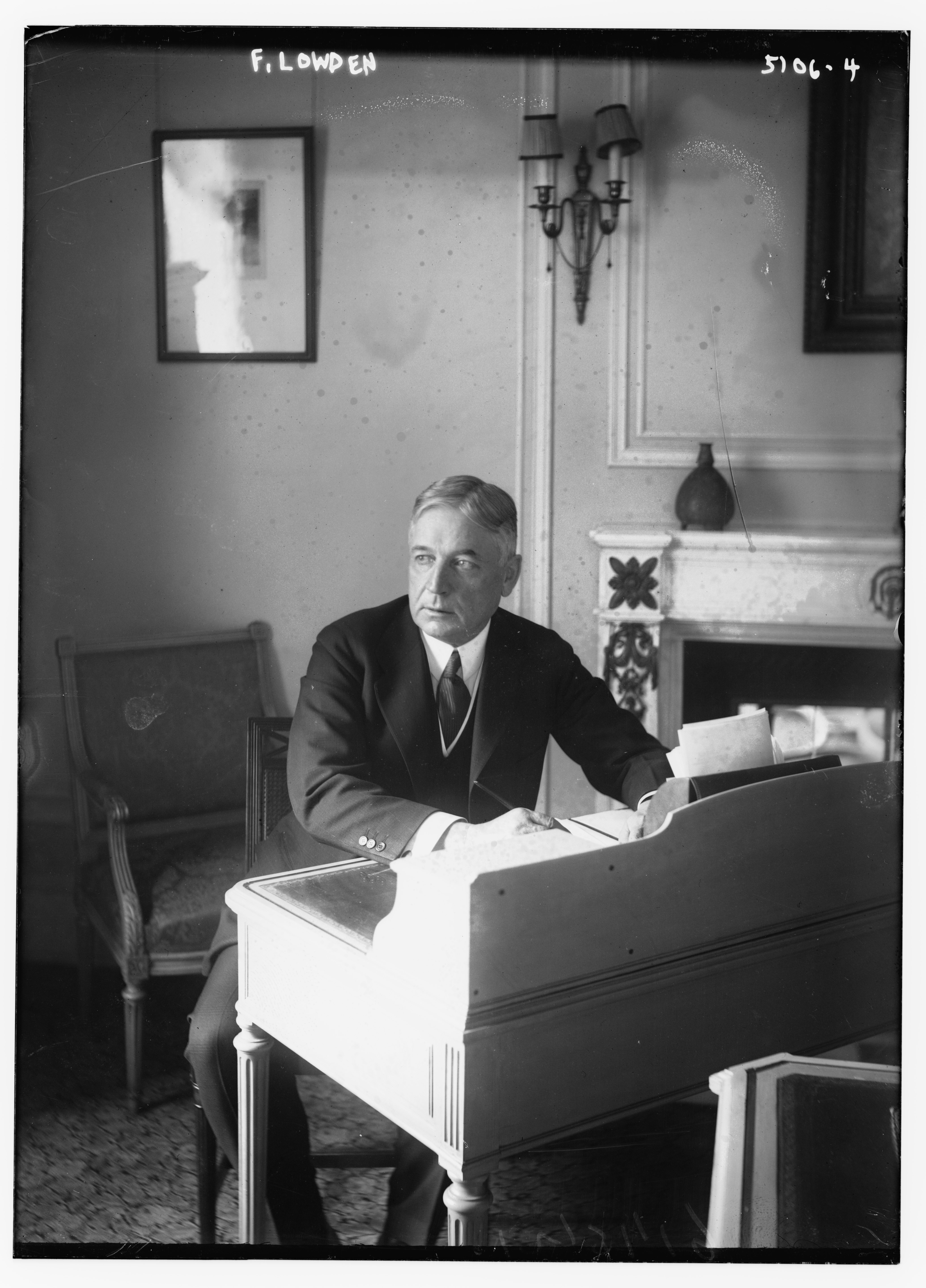
Governor Lowden at his desk, 1919

From 1917 to 1921, he was the Governor of Illinois. While governor, he won wide notice for the major reorganization of state government he spearheaded. He introduced the budget system for state expenditure, thereby reducing the rate of taxation in spite of rising prices.

He was a strong supporter of the death penalty, and when in 1918 both houses of the Illinois General Assembly voted to abolish capital punishment, he vetoed the bill. He was energetic in marshalling the resources of his state in support of the United States' World War I effort.

In 1917, when the mayor of Chicago refused to interfere with a meeting of the People's Council, an organization accused of pro-Germanism, he ordered out the state troops to prevent the meeting. He favoured woman suffrage and the enforcement of the Volstead Act for war-time prohibition. He was opposed to the League of Nations without reservations, on the ground that it would create a super-state. He gained nationwide stature for his handling of the Chicago Race Riot of 1919 and a simultaneous transit strike in Chicago.

=== 1920 presidential election and aftermath ===
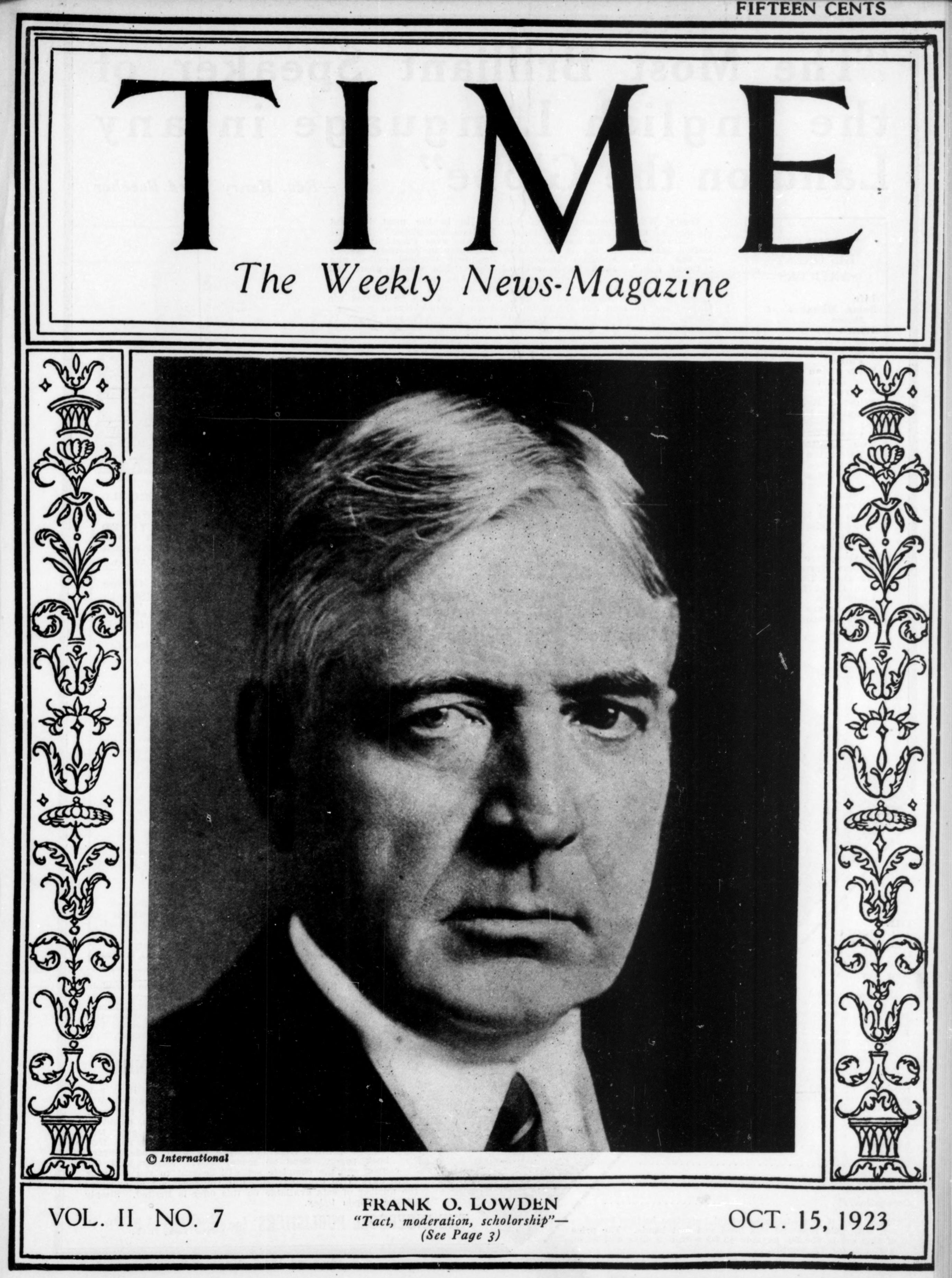
Time cover, October 15, 1923

He was a leading candidate for the Republican nomination for president in 1920. His campaign was embarrassed by reports of profligate spending. His Missouri campaign manager gave out $32,000 to promote his campaign, including $2,500 (a laborer's annual wage) to at least two convention delegates.

Delegates at the Republican convention deadlocked over several ballots between Lowden and General Leonard Wood, resulting in party leaders meeting privately to determine a compromise candidate. Their choice, Warren G. Harding, went on to win the nomination.

In the 1924 election, he declined the Republican nomination for vice president. In 1928, he again positioned himself to run for the party's nomination, but he was never much more than a minor threat to front runner Herbert Hoover, who went on to win the presidential nomination and the election.

== Railroad career ==
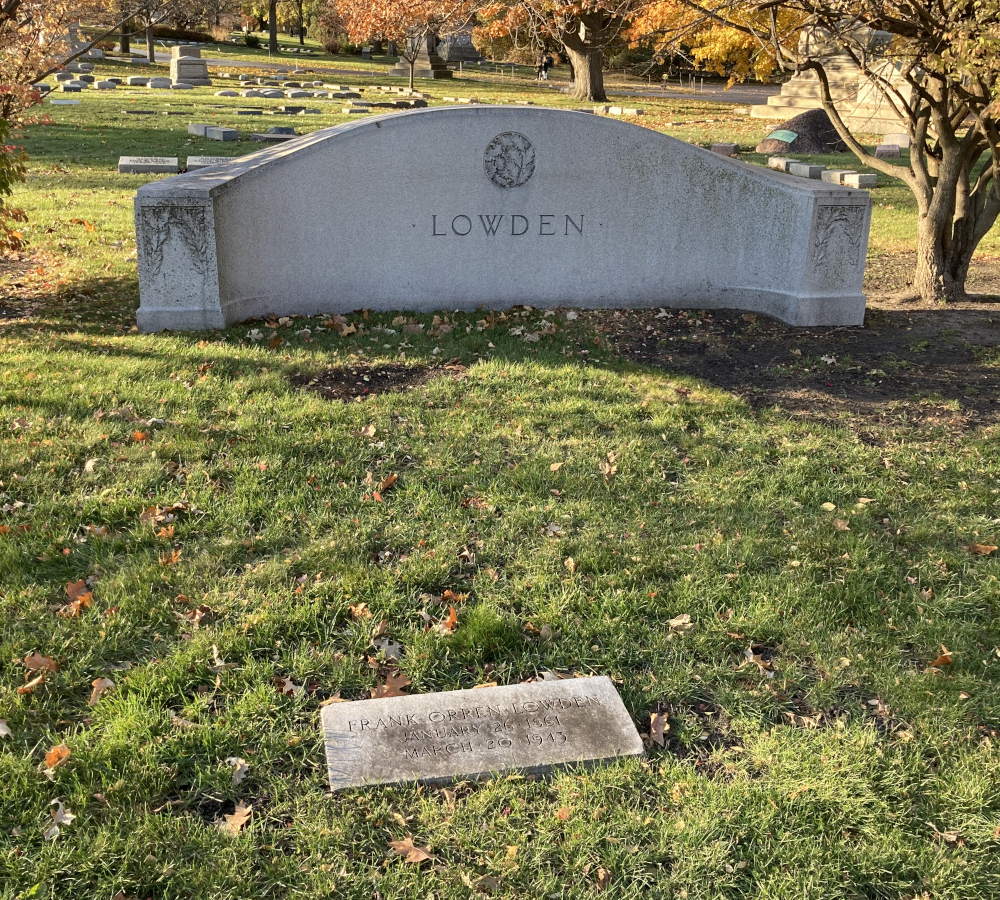
Lowden's grave at Graceland Cemetery

In 1933, Lowden was appointed to be one of three receivers for the bankrupt Chicago, Rock Island and Pacific Railroad. He served in this capacity with co-receivers Joseph B. Fleming and James E. Gorman (the latter had been president of the railroad since 1917) until his death in 1943 in Tucson, Arizona. His remains are buried in Graceland Cemetery, Chicago.

== Legacy ==
The following are named after Lowden: Camp Lowden Boy Scout Camp, Lowden State Park and Lowden-Miller State Forest, all near his estate outside Oregon, Illinois; the Frank O. Lowden Homes in Chicago; and two Lowden Halls, located on the campus of the Northwestern University School of Law in Chicago and Northern Illinois University in DeKalb.

A plaque dedicated to Lowden can be found in Lowden State Park, in front of a flagpole not far from Illinois Route 56. It was erected by the Holstein-Friesian Association of America, for which he served as president from 1921 until 1930.

== Bibliography ==
- Hutchinson, William T. (1957). Lowden of Illinois: The Life of Frank O. Lowden. University of Chicago Press. LCCN 57006274.

U.S. House of Representatives
Preceded by Robert R. Hitt	Member of the U.S. House of Representatives from Illinois's 13th congressional district 1906–1911	Succeeded by John C. McKenzie
Party political offices
Preceded by Charles S. Deneen	Republican nominee for Governor of Illinois; 1916	Succeeded by Len Small
Preceded by Calvin Coolidge	Republican nominee for Vice President of the United States; Withdrew; 1924	Succeeded by Charles G. Dawes
Political offices
Preceded by Edward Dunne	Governor of Illinois; 1917–1921	Succeeded by Len Small
Awards and achievements
Preceded by H. H. Asquith	Cover of Time; 15 October 1923	Succeeded by John W. Weeks
