= John G. Oglesby =

American politician (1873–1938)

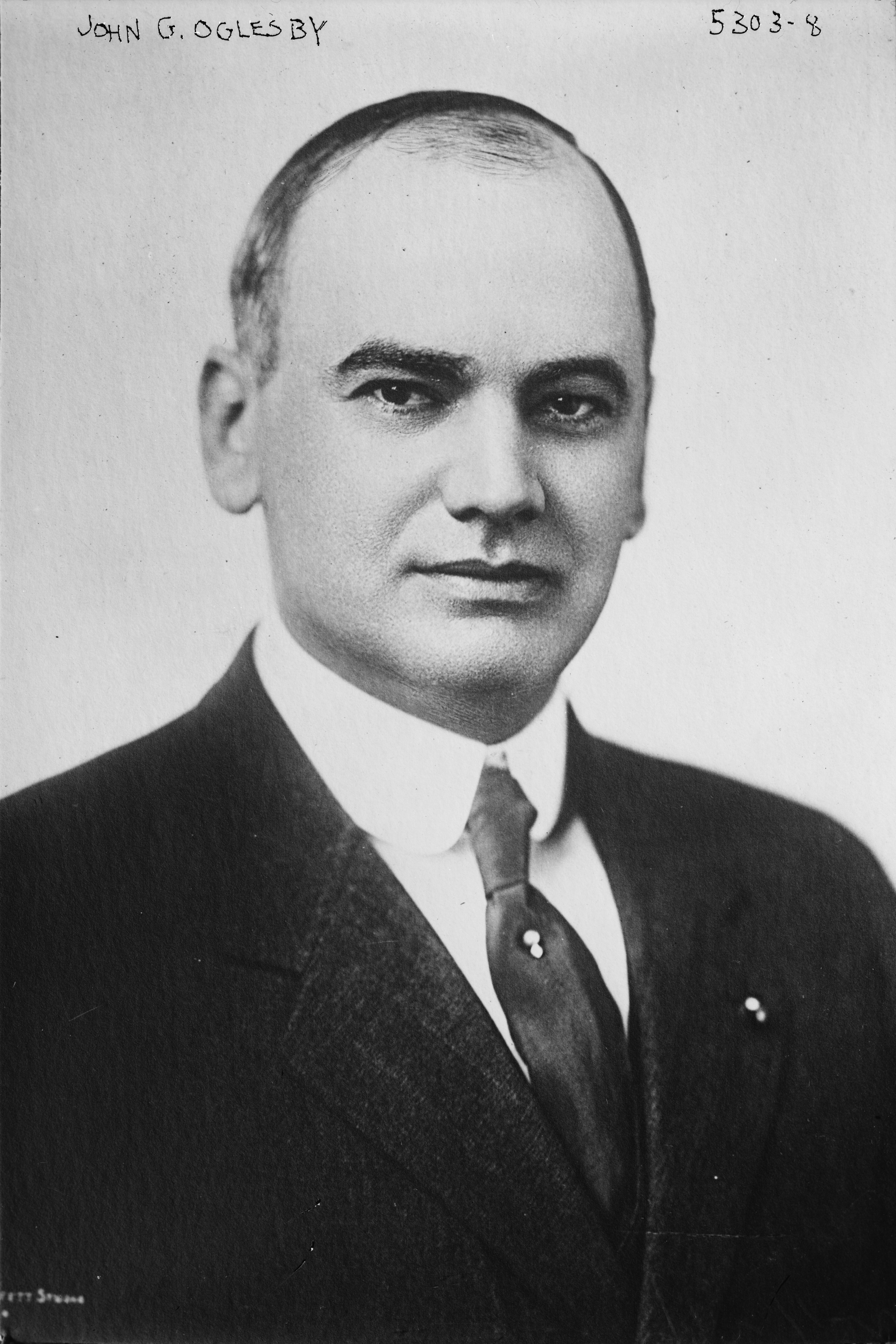
John Gillett Oglesby

John Gillett Oglesby (March 19, 1873 – May 27, 1938) was the 29th and 31st Lieutenant Governor of Illinois from 1909 to 1913, during this time he served under Governor Charles S. Deneen, and again from 1917 to 1921 serving under Governor Frank O. Lowden.

Born in Decatur, Illinois, on March 19, 1873, he was the son of Illinois Governor Richard James Oglesby and Emma Gillet Oglesby, a member of the prominent Oglesby political family of Kentucky and Illinois. Oglesby served in the United States Army during the Spanish–American War and was a member of Illinois House of Representatives in 1905. He served as lieutenant governor for two non-consecutive terms, from 1909 to 1913 and from 1917 to 1921. (He ran for reelection after his first term in 1912 and was defeated).

He was a candidate in the Republican primary for governor in 1920 and in 1936. Oglesby was a delegate from Illinois to the Republican National Conventions in 1920, 1924, 1928, and 1932.

Oglesby was a delegate to the Illinois convention to ratify the Twenty-first Amendment to the United States Constitution in 1933.

He died near Elkhart in Logan County, Illinois, and is interred at Elkhart Cemetery.

== See also ==
- 1908 Illinois lieutenant gubernatorial election
- 1912 Illinois lieutenant gubernatorial election
- 1916 Illinois lieutenant gubernatorial election

Party political offices
Preceded by Lawrence Yates Sherman	Republican nominee for Lieutenant Governor of Illinois; 1908, 1912, 1916	Succeeded by Fred E. Sterling
Political offices
Preceded by Lawrence Yates Sherman	Lieutenant Governor of Illinois; 1909–1913	Succeeded by Barratt O'Hara
Preceded by Barratt O'Hara	Lieutenant Governor of Illinois; 1917–1921	Succeeded by Fred E. Sterling
