= Richard B. Vail =

American politician (1895–1955)

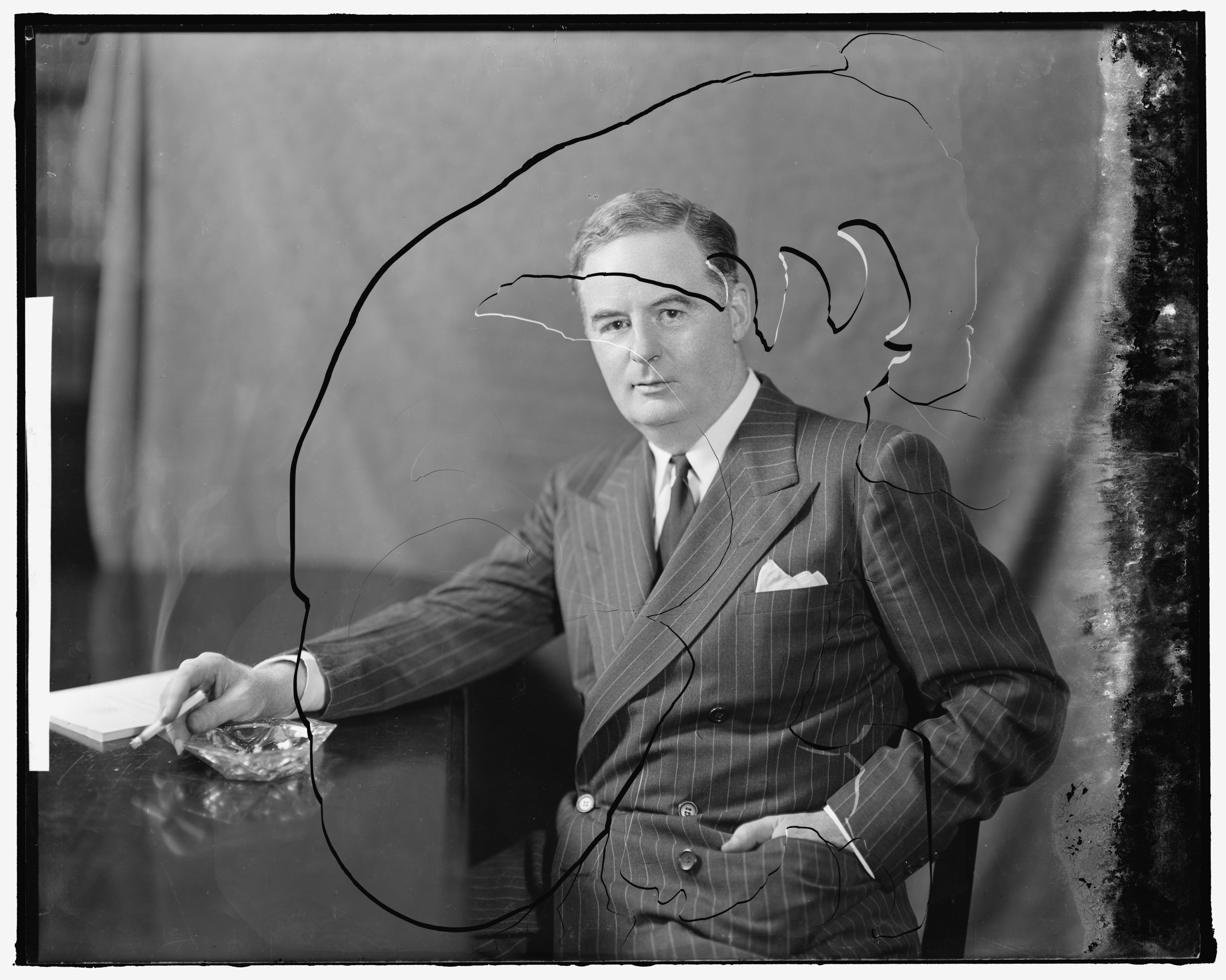
- Vail in an undated photograph

Member of the U.S. House of Representatives from Illinois's 2nd district
- In office January 3, 1951 – January 3, 1953
- Preceded by: Barratt O'Hara
- Succeeded by: Barratt O'Hara
- In office January 3, 1947 – January 3, 1949
- Preceded by: William A. Rowan
- Succeeded by: Barratt O'Hara

Personal details
- Born: Richard Bernard Vail; August 31, 1895 Chicago, Illinois
- Died: July 29, 1955 (aged 59) Chicago, Illinois
- Resting place: Holy Sepulchre Cemetery; 41.689228°N 87.7706°W
- Party: Republican
- Education: John Marshall Law School

Richard Bernard Vail (August 31, 1895 – July 29, 1955) was an American businessman and U.S. Representative from Illinois.

== Background ==
Richard B. Vail was born on August 31, 1895, in Chicago, Illinois. He attended public school, the School of Commerce, the Chicago Technical College, and the John Marshall Law School.

== Career ==
During World War I, he served in the United States Army as a lieutenant of infantry. He then engaged in the manufacture of steel products.

=== Federal service ===
Vail worked for the Federal Bureau of Investigation (FBI) before running for office.

Vail was elected as a Republican to the Eightieth Congress (January 3, 1947 – January 3, 1949), defeating a second-term Democratic incumbent with 51%. The Sovietization of Poland was a major issue in a district with a substantial Polish-American constituency. He served on the Committee on Veterans' Affairs and the House Un-American Activities Committee. Vail was successful with a law to provide adaptive housing for disabled veterans.

Illinois redistricted in 1947 for the first time since 1901; Vail lost half his constituents. A new Democratic opponent held Vail to 47% and prevented his reelection to the Eighty-first Congress. Vail recovered his seat for the Eighty-second Congress (January 3, 1951 – January 3, 1953), winning with 54%. Despite the Eisenhower wave in 1952, which carried his district, Vail lost his seat in his third contest with Barratt O'Hara. Vail tried again in 1954, losing to O'Hara by a huge 23 points. The Republican seized on the growing numbers of African-Americans in appeals to white voters, which apparently back-fired.

=== Private sector ===
He served as chairman of the board of directors of the Vail Manufacturing Company of Chicago. Vail manufactured staplers, paper clips, and fasteners and was eventually acquired by Acco International in 1966.

== Personal and death ==
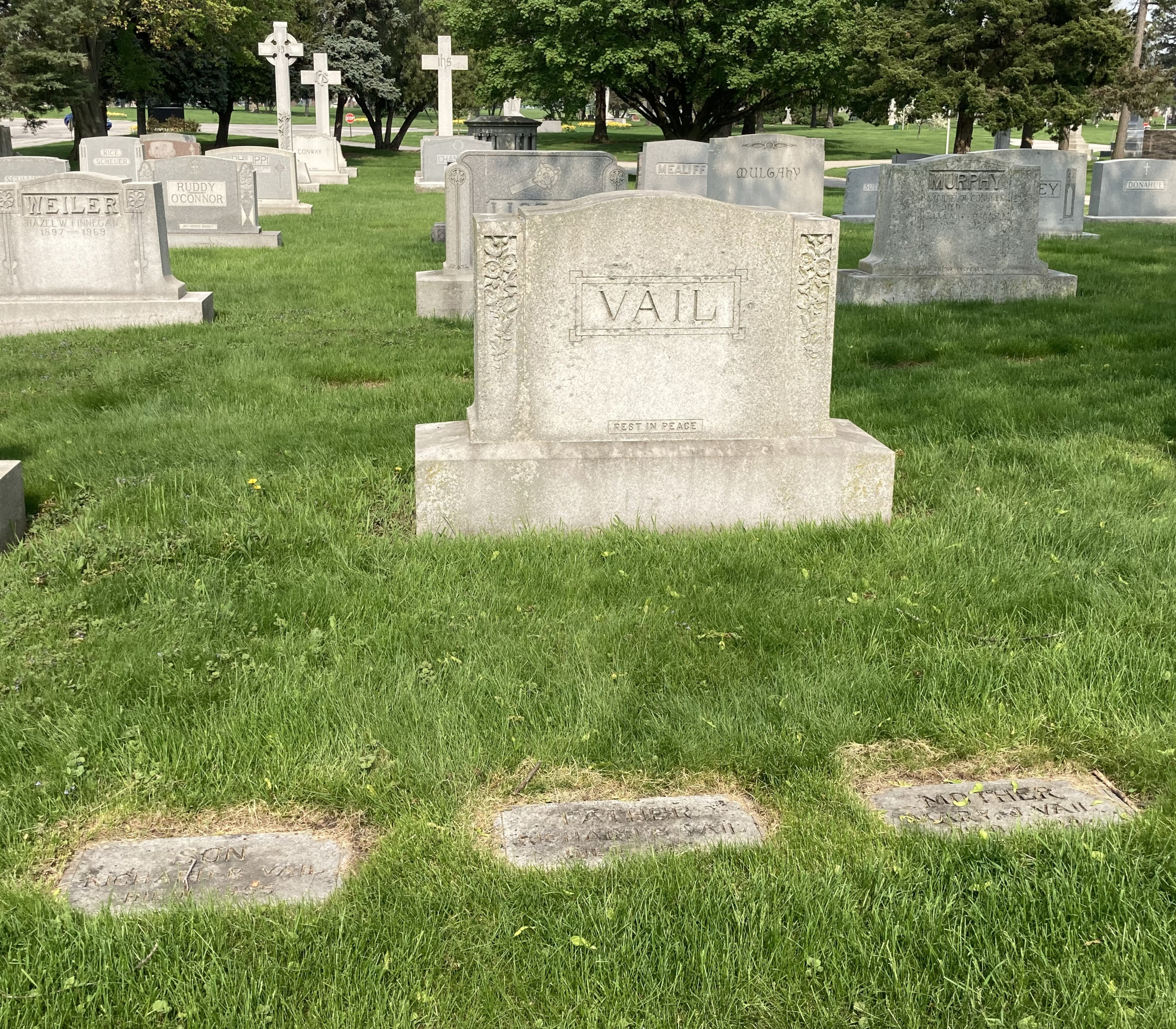
Vail's grave at Holy Sepulchre Cemetery

Vail died age 59 on July 29, 1955, in Chicago and was interred in Holy Sepulchre Cemetery in Alsip, Illinois.

== See also ==
- 80th United States Congress
- House Un-American Activities Committee
- List of members of the House Un-American Activities Committee

U.S. House of Representatives
Preceded by William A. Rowan	Member of the U.S. House of Representatives from Illinois's 2nd congressional district 1947–1949	Succeeded by Barratt O'Hara
Preceded by Barratt O'Hara	Member of the U.S. House of Representatives from Illinois's 2nd congressional district 1951–1953	Succeeded by Barratt O'Hara
