= Barratt O'Hara =

American politician (1882–1969)

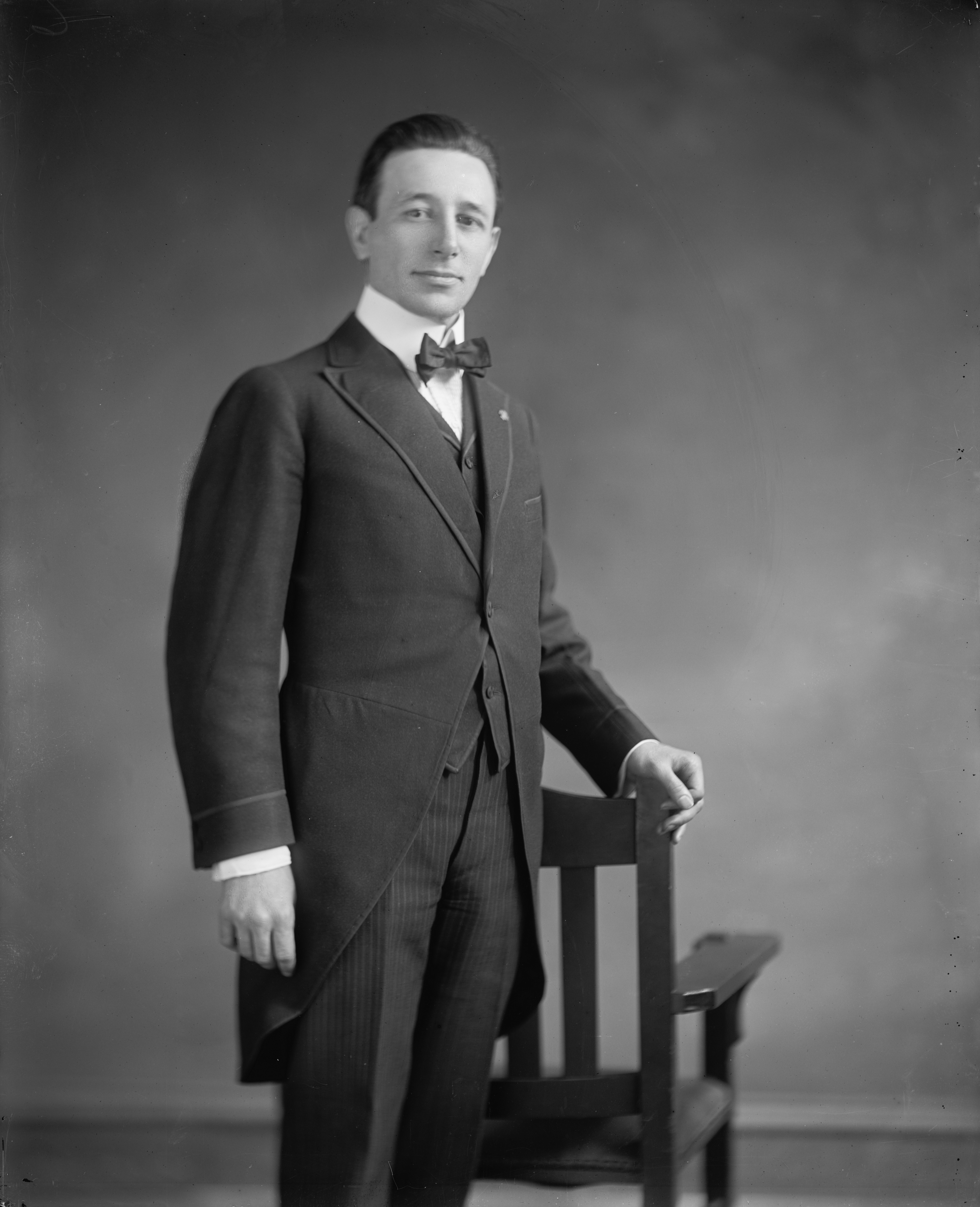
- O'Hara, circa 1905

Member of the U.S. House of Representatives from Illinois's 2nd district
- In office January 3, 1953 – January 3, 1969
- Preceded by: Richard B. Vail
- Succeeded by: Abner Mikva
- In office January 3, 1949 – January 3, 1951
- Preceded by: Richard B. Vail
- Succeeded by: Richard B. Vail

30th Lieutenant Governor of Illinois
- In office February 3, 1913 – January 8, 1917
- Governor: Edward Fitzsimmons Dunne
- Preceded by: John G. Oglesby
- Succeeded by: John G. Oglesby

Personal details
- Born: April 28, 1882 St. Joseph, Michigan
- Died: August 11, 1969 (aged 87) Washington, D.C.
- Party: Democratic

Barratt O'Hara (April 28, 1882 – August 11, 1969) was an American Democratic politician who served as a United States representative from Illinois and lieutenant governor of that state. He was the last Spanish–American War veteran to serve in Congress.

== Early life ==
Barratt O'Hara was born in Saint Joseph, Berrien County, Michigan, April 28, 1882. He attended the public schools of Berrien Springs and Benton Harbor; later he went to Nicaragua with his father and attended school at San Juan del Norte. At age fifteen, during the Spanish-American War, he enlisted in the United States Army and served as a corporal in Company I, Thirty-third Michigan Volunteer Infantry, at the Siege of Santiago, in Cuba. In 1906, O'Hara married Florence Hoffman, the daughter of hymn writer Elisha Hoffman.

== Newspaper service ==
After two years O'Hara returned to Benton Harbor and graduated from high school; reporter, Benton Harbor Evening News, 1900; attended Missouri University in 1901 and 1902 and Northwestern University in 1909 and 1910; graduated from Chicago-Kent College of Law in 1912; sporting editor of St. Louis, Mo., Chronicle in 1902 and the Chicago American 1903–1905; editor with Chicago Chronicle in 1906, Chicago Examiner 1907–1910, and Chicago Magazine and Sunday Telegram 1910–1912; Lieutenant Governor of Illinois 1913–1917; chairman of Illinois senate vice and wage investigations 1913–1915; was admitted to the bar in 1912 and commenced the practice of law in Chicago, Ill.

== Political career ==
O'Hara was elected lieutenant governor of Illinois in 1912 and served from 1913 through 1917.

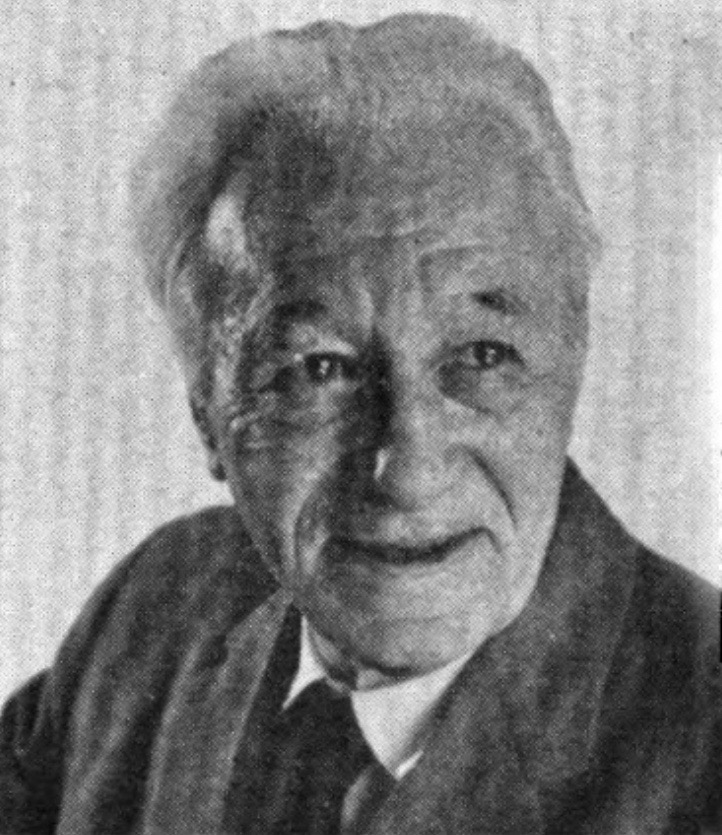
O'Hara in his years as a congressman

O'Hara was an unsuccessful Democratic candidate for the United States Senate in 1914; during the First World War served as a major with the Eightieth and Twelfth Infantry Divisions and later as divisional judge advocate of the Fifteenth Division; president of the Arizona Film Co., in 1916 and 1917; unsuccessful candidate for governor in 1920, and for Congressman-at-large in 1936 to the Seventy-fifth Congress; radio commentator in Chicago 1933–1935; elected as a Democrat to the Eighty-first Congress (January 3, 1949 – January 3, 1951); unsuccessful candidate for reelection in 1950 to the Eighty-second Congress; elected to the Eighty-third and to the seven succeeding Congresses (January 3, 1953 – January 3, 1969); unsuccessful Democratic candidate for renomination in 1968; died in Washington, D.C., August 11, 1969; interment in Oak Woods Cemetery in Chicago.

Party political offices
Preceded by Elmer A. Perry	Democratic nominee for Lieutenant Governor of Illinois; 1912	Succeeded by Henry W. Huttmann
Political offices
Preceded by John G. Oglesby	Lieutenant Governor of Illinois; 1913–1917	Succeeded by John G. Oglesby
U.S. House of Representatives
Preceded by Richard B. Vail	Member of the U.S. House of Representatives from Illinois's 2nd congressional district 1949–1951	Succeeded by Richard B. Vail
Preceded by Richard B. Vail	Member of the U.S. House of Representatives from Illinois's 2nd congressional district 1953–1969	Succeeded by Abner J. Mikva
Honorary titles
Preceded by Clarence Cannon	Oldest member of the U.S. House of Representatives; 1964–1969	Succeeded by William L. Dawson
