= Samuel J. Drew =

American politician (1863–1926)

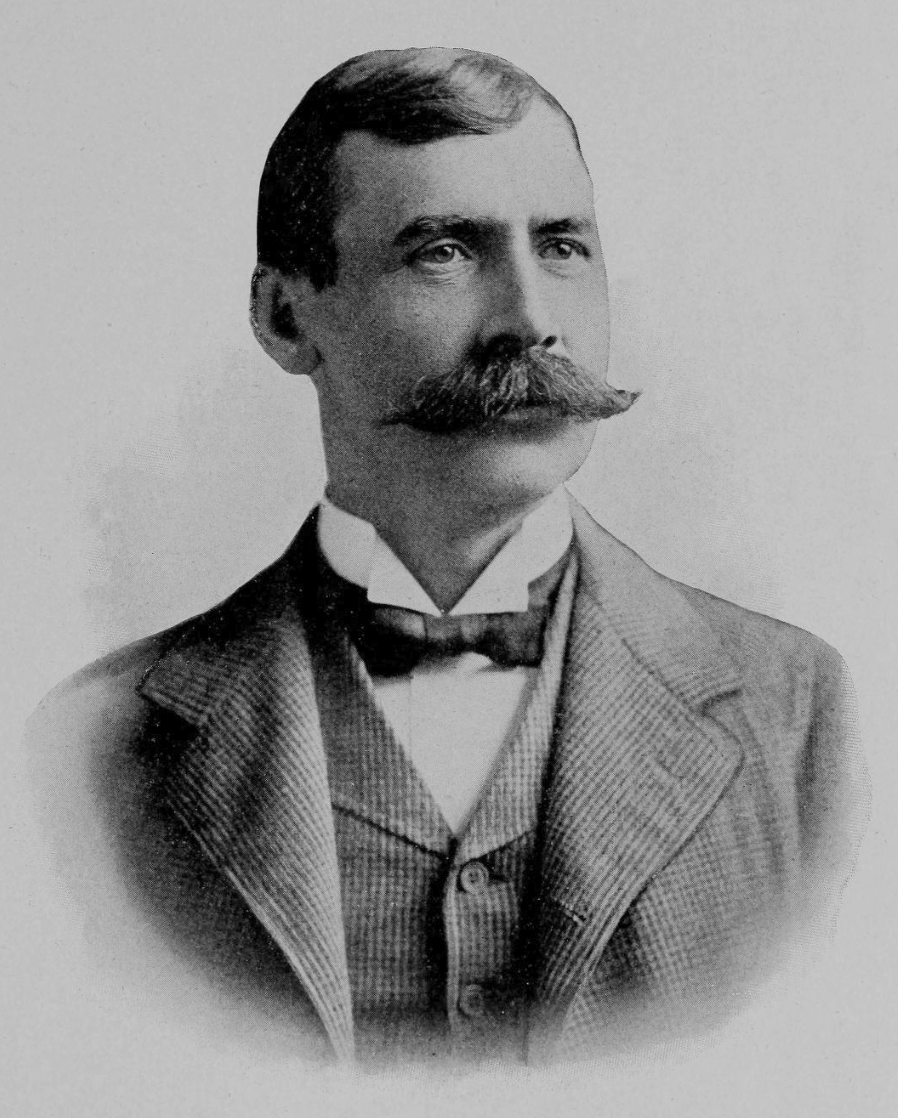

Member of the Illinois House of Representatives from the 41st district
- In office 1902 – 1906
- Preceded by: redistricted

Member of the Illinois House of Representatives from the 25th district
- In office 1898 – 1902
- Succeeded by: redistricted

Personal details
- Born: April 22, 1863 Tipton, Staffordshire
- Died: January 22, 1926 (aged 62)
- Party: Republican
- Profession: Attorney
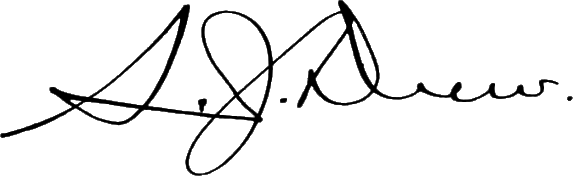
- Signature

Samuel J. Drew (April 22, 1863 – January 22, 1926) was an English American politician from Staffordshire. Emigrating with his family to Will County, Illinois, Drew worked in the coal mines until saving enough to take a course at the Northern Indiana Normal School.

Drew later passed the bar and then worked in politics in the county seat of Joliet. He was elected to four consecutive terms in the Illinois House of Representatives from 1898 to 1906.

== Biography ==
Samuel J. Drew was born in Tipton, Staffordshire, England, on April 22, 1863. His parents emigrated to the United States in 1882 settling in Braidwood, Illinois. Drew attended public schools until he was thirteen, when he went to work in a coal mine to support his family. In 1886, Drew had saved enough money to take a business course at the Northern Indiana Normal School, graduating the next year. His studies allowed him to get a job as a court reporter. He later rose to become the chief clerk of the Illinois Steel Company.

Drew enjoyed to read in his free time and eventually studied to pass the bar. In 1896, he was elected Town Clerk of Joliet, a role he served for two years. In 1898, he was elected to the Illinois House of Representatives as a Republican. Drew was re-elected to the lower house in 1900, 1902, and 1904. His experience in the mines made him an ideal candidate for the committees on Labor & Industrial Affairs and Mines & Mining. He became known for his Drew Bill, which forbade the importing of labor from other states; it was the first of its kind in the nation. Drew later served as probate judge of Will County.

Drew married Lizzie B. Parsons and had a daughter, Alberta. He was active in Freemasonry and was a member of the Knights of Pythias. Drew was an active Methodist. He died on January 22, 1926, and was buried in Oakwood Cemetery in Joliet.
