= Edward Fitzsimmons Dunne =

Governor of Illinois from 1913 to 1917

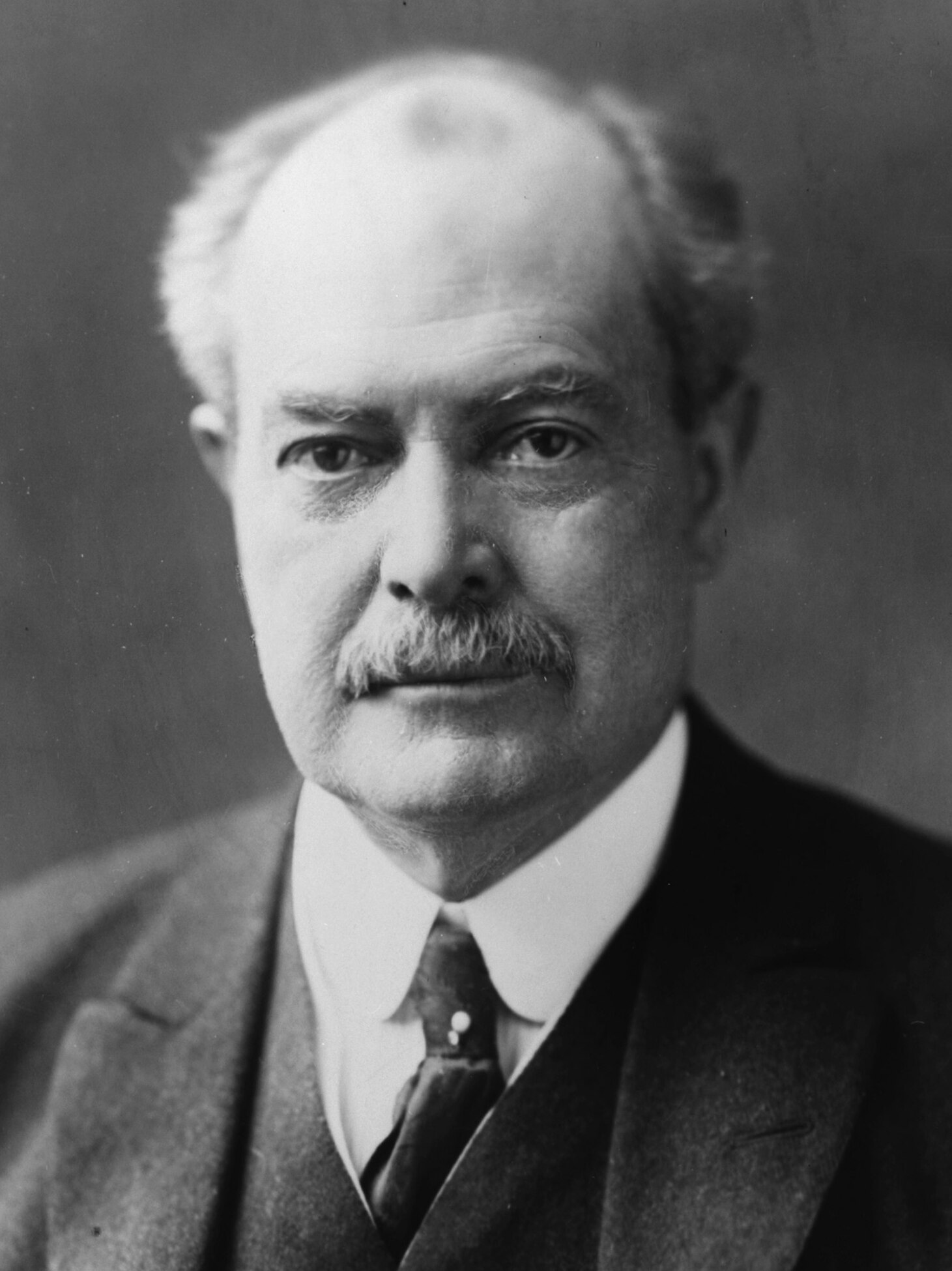
- Portrait, c. 1912

24th Governor of Illinois
- In office February 3, 1913 – January 8, 1917
- Lieutenant: Barratt O'Hara
- Preceded by: Charles S. Deneen
- Succeeded by: Frank Orren Lowden

38th Mayor of Chicago
- In office April 10, 1905 – April 15, 1907
- Preceded by: Carter Harrison IV
- Succeeded by: Fred A. Busse

Judge of the Circuit Court of Cook County
- In office 1892–1905

United States Commissioner for the Century of Progress World's Fair
- In office 1933–1934
- President: Franklin D. Roosevelt
- Preceded by: Office established
- Succeeded by: Office abolished

Personal details
- Born: October 12, 1853 Watertown, Connecticut, US
- Died: May 24, 1937 (aged 83) Chicago, Illinois, US
- Resting place: Calvary Cemetery
- Party: Democratic
- Spouse: Elizabeth J. Kelly (m. 1881; died 1928)
- Profession: Lawyer, Judge, Politician

Edward Fitzsimmons Dunne (October 12, 1853 – May 24, 1937) was an American politician, lawyer, and jurist who was the 38th mayor of Chicago from 1905 to 1907 and the 24th governor of Illinois from 1913 to 1917. Dunne is the only person to be elected both mayor of Chicago and governor of Illinois. He also served as a judge of the Illinois circuit court for Cook County from 1892 to 1905.

A 1994 survey of experts on Chicago politics assessed Dunne as one of the ten best mayors in the city's history (up to that time). (Note: The others in the top-ten were Anton Cermak (mayor 1931–33); Richard J. Daley (mayor 1955–76); Richard M. Daley (then-incumbent mayor since 1989); Carter Harrison III (mayor 1879–1887 and 1893); Carter Harrison IV (mayor 1897–1905 and 1911–15); Edward Joseph Kelly (mayor 1933–47); William B. Ogden (mayor 1837–38); Harold Washington (mayor 1983–87); John Wentworth (mayor 1857–58 and 1860–61))

== Early years ==
Born in 1853, in Watertown, Connecticut, he was the son of an ardent Irish nationalist, Patrick William (P. W.) Dunne (1832–1921), who emigrated to America in 1849 after the failed Young Ireland revolt. After moving to the United States, his father remained an ardent backer of Irish independence. His mother, Delia Mary (Mary) Lawlor, was the daughter of a prosperous Irish contractor, and participant in the Irish Rebellion of 1798, who helped construct the docks of Galway.

The family moved to Peoria, Illinois in 1855 while Dunne was still an infant, and he was educated there in the public schools. Dunne had three sisters. His father refused to send his son to the local Catholic academy, because the Catholic Church had spoken out against the activities of the Fenians.

P. W. Dunne was a prosperous businessman, active in both Irish and American politics. He raised money for the Fenians, gave generously of his own funds, and frequently hosted Irish politicians, political exiles, and rebels in his home when they traveled to Chicago. P. W. Dunne served on the Peoria City Council in the 1860s and was elected to the Illinois House of Representatives.

== Education and early career ==
After Dunne graduated from Peoria High School in 1871, he was sent to Ireland to attend Trinity College Dublin. His father wanted his son to be educated at the alma mater of Irish patriot, Robert Emmet. Among his classmates was the author Oscar Wilde. Dunne did extremely well at Trinity, but was forced to leave one year short of graduation, after his father suffered a financial setback.

Dunne returned to Illinois, and finished his education at Union College of Law in Chicago (that was jointly run by Northwestern University and the Old University of Chicago), where his family had settled in 1877. He graduated from the Union College of Law in 1878. He married Elizabeth F. Kelly, the daughter of Edward F. Kelly, a Chicago businessman, and his wife, Kitty Howe Kelly, on August 16, 1881. Following his marriage, he started a prosperous legal practice. The Dunnes had thirteen children, with nine of them surviving into adulthood. His children included: Eileen Dunne Corboy, Mona T. Leonard, Maurice Dunne, Richard Dunne, Jeanette Dunne, Edward F. Dunne Jr., Geraldine Dunne, Eugene Dunne, and Judge Robert Jerome "Duke" Dunne.

== Circuit court judgeship ==
In 1892, at age 28, Dunne was elected judge of Cook County Circuit Court and served from 1892 to 1905.

During his judgeship, he was also elected the first president of the Irish Fellowship Club of Chicago in 1901. He had played a key role in the formation of this organization, which championed Irish independence.

Cook County Circuit Court and Cook County Superior Court judges sat in the Cook County Criminal Court in one-month rotations. While sitting in the criminal court on such a rotation, Dunne had originally been assigned to preside over the high-profile trial of Patrick Eugene Prendergast for the murder (assassination) of Chicago Mayor Carter Harrison III On November 6, 1893, Dunne presided over a brief trial session in which the defense attorneys declared that they intended to plead insanity for Prendergast, and asked for a continuance until December 4 on the grounds that they lacked the time to prepare. Dunne granted this continuance. Since he rotated out of the criminal court by December, Judge Theodore Brentano ultimately presided over the trial instead.

In late 1901, Dunne was one of three judges presiding over a criminal conspiracy case against Illinois Democratic political boss Robert E. Burke. Burke had served as a Chicago municipal oil inspector under Chicago mayor Carter Harrison IV and was charged with a conspiracy related to $65,000 he accepted in compensation. Burke had acted in disregard of an agreement he had signed when taking the position to return the charges he collected in return for a flat compensation. Facing the prospect of charges, Burke returned $30,000 to the city in worries that not returning it might place himself in greater legal jeopardy. Conspiracy charges were brought against Burke by Charles S. Deneen, the Republican Cook County state's attorney. Burke's defense attorney, A. S. Trude, successfully used a defectively-constructed ordinance's judicial construction to persuade Dunne and the other two judges (Theodore Brentano and Marcus Kavanagh) to rule that the entire $65,000 was actually the rightful property of Burke and that he had actually unwittingly deprived himself of $30,000 of which he was entitled to hold by returning it to the city. Trude did this by arguing that Burke could not be criminally charged, because the city ordinance requiring the Chicago city oil inspector to give the city the fees he collected was, in fact, superseded by the state legislation that had established the position and its provision that allowed for the collection and the retention of all fees by the city oil inspector.

Another newsworthy trial that Dunne presided over was the 1895 trial of Alderman Charles Martin for alleged acceptance of bribes.

== Mayoralty ==
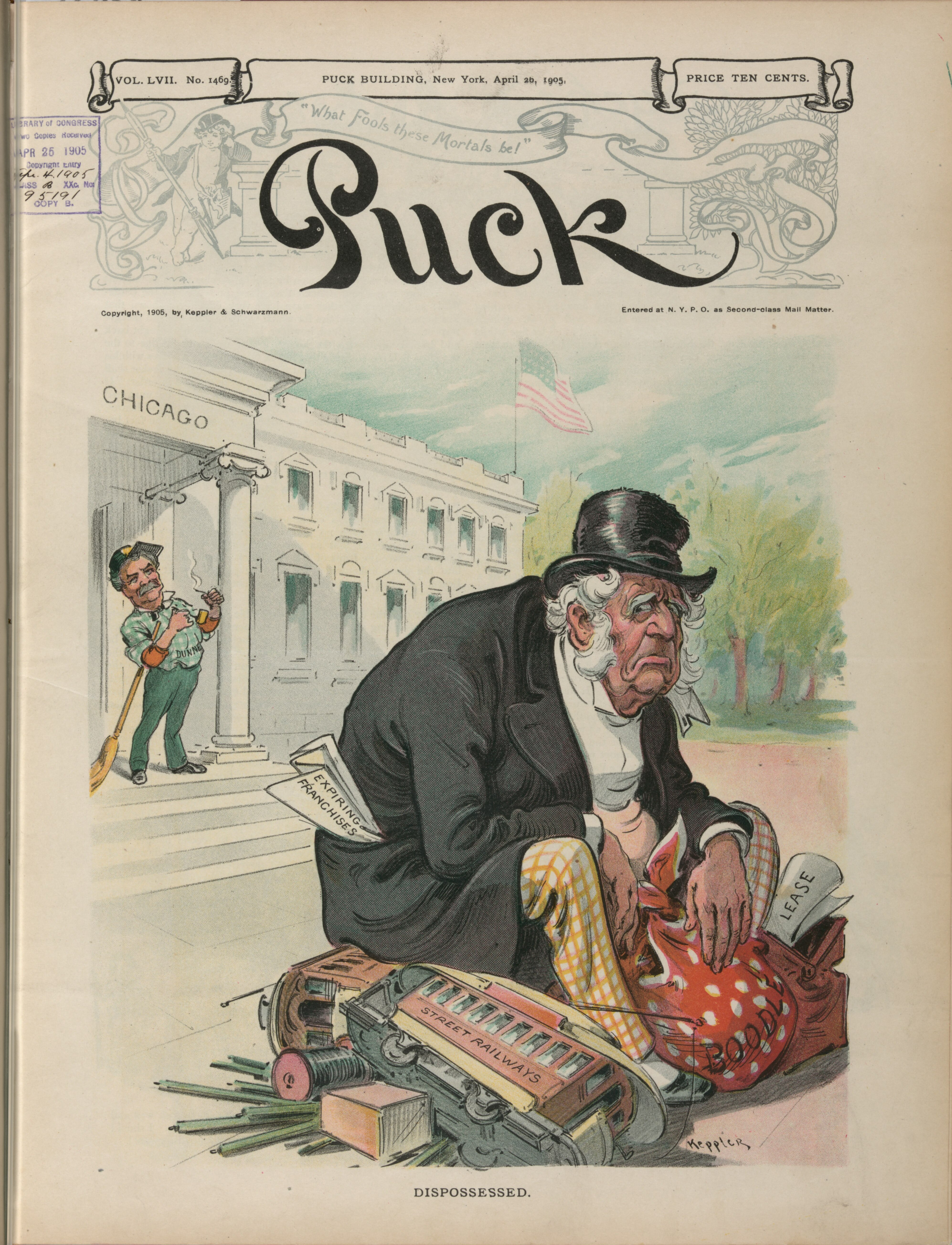
Cover of the April 25, 1905 edition of Puck, portraying Dunne as dispossessing traction interests of their franchises

Dunne resigned his judgeship to run for mayor in January 1905, winning election on April 4, 1905, beating the Republican John Maynard Harlan. Dunne won with majorities in 22 of 35 wards in the city. The final tally was 161,189 votes for Dunne and 138,671 given to Harlan. His election was greeted with jubilation by social reformers throughout the nation. He was formally inaugurated on April 10, 1905 in the council of chambers in Chicago. At the annual Jefferson Day banquet held shortly after his inauguration, he was praised by William Jennings Bryan and Mayor Tom L. Johnson as a dynamic new leader of the national movement for reform. The primary issue which Dunne had campaigned upon, and the primary issue he would focus on as mayor, was the city's traction issue, for which he sternly favored having a solution which would result in immediate municipal ownership of the city's streetcar lines. As his primary assistant, Dunne chose Clarence Darrow, who was given the title of "Special Traction Counsel to the Mayor". After Darrow resigned from this role in November 1905, in 1906 Dunne appointed Walter L. Fisher as his replacement.

As Mayor, Dunne was instrumental in reducing the price of gasoline in Chicago from $1.00 to 85 cents, and of water from 10 cents to 7 cents per thousand gallons. He was also a strong proponent of municipal ownership of public utilities.

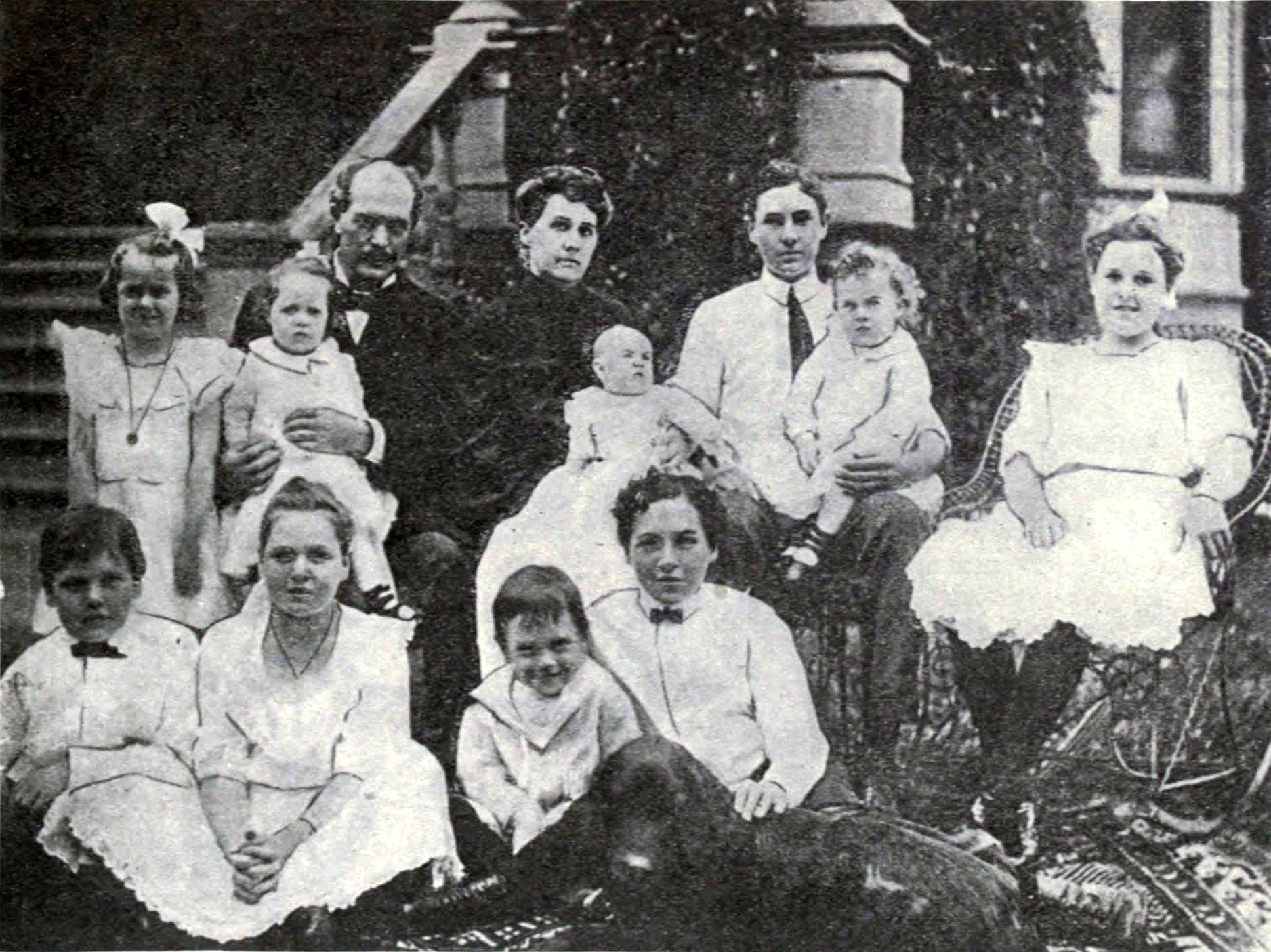
Dunne with family, circa 1905

Dunne was defeated in his bid for reelection in 1907 by Republican Fred A. Busse.

A 1994 survey of experts on Chicago politics saw Dunne ranked as one of the ten best mayors in the city's history (up to that time).

=== Progressive reforms attempted under Mayor Dunne 1905-1907 ===
The seven members of Board of Education appointed by Mayor Dunne, a Democrat, included the Progressive Party's 1912 leaders like Jane Addams. Its reforms were reversed by the conservative Republican mayor Fred A. Busse in 1908. Nevertheless, the reforms played a pivotal role in early 20th-century educational debates by challenging the prevailing "administrative progressive" approach that emphasized efficiency, centralized authority, and strong superintendents—an approach that paralleled the broader city manager movement in American governance. The board served as a microcosm of progressive ideals, advocating for:.

- Labor Rights: Support for teacher unions and broader labor organizations.
- Decentralized Decision-Making: Emphasis on community input rather than top-down control.
- Transparency: Promotion of openness in teacher promotions and textbook contracts.
- Inclusion: Efforts to diversify community representation on boards and commissions.
- The Dunne Board stood out for its diverse composition, breaking from the tradition of male business leaders dominating Chicago's educational governance. Women actively challenged male-dominated structures. Labor Representatives amplified working-class voices on school issues. Social Reformers included individuals committed to progressive causes. These reformers' members formed overlapping networks, often rooted in "Social Gospel" Protestantism, and allied with labor and immigrant groups—most notably Margaret Haley and the Teachers' Federation—in opposition to the propertied elite.

The board prioritized practical reforms such as improved teacher salaries and greater teacher involvement in decision-making, reducing the superintendent's power. Its support for the Teachers’ Federation was a dramatic new factor in Chicago affairs. The new Teacher Advisory Councils embraced participatory democracy by valuing teachers’ classroom experience in policy decisions. Although most of the Dunne Board's reforms were quickly reversed, they left a lasting legacy. Concepts such as teachers’ councils are now widely accepted as mechanisms for professional input. The board's commitment to open debate and public participation is reflected in today's open meeting acts, demonstrating that their vision for a democratic educational system ultimately prevailed.

== Post-mayoralty ==
After his mayoralty ended on April 15, 1907, Dunne returned to his legal practice.

Dunne was narrowly defeated in the 1911 Democratic mayoral primary by another former Chicago mayor, Carter H. Harrison IV, who went on to regain the mayoralty.

== Governorship ==
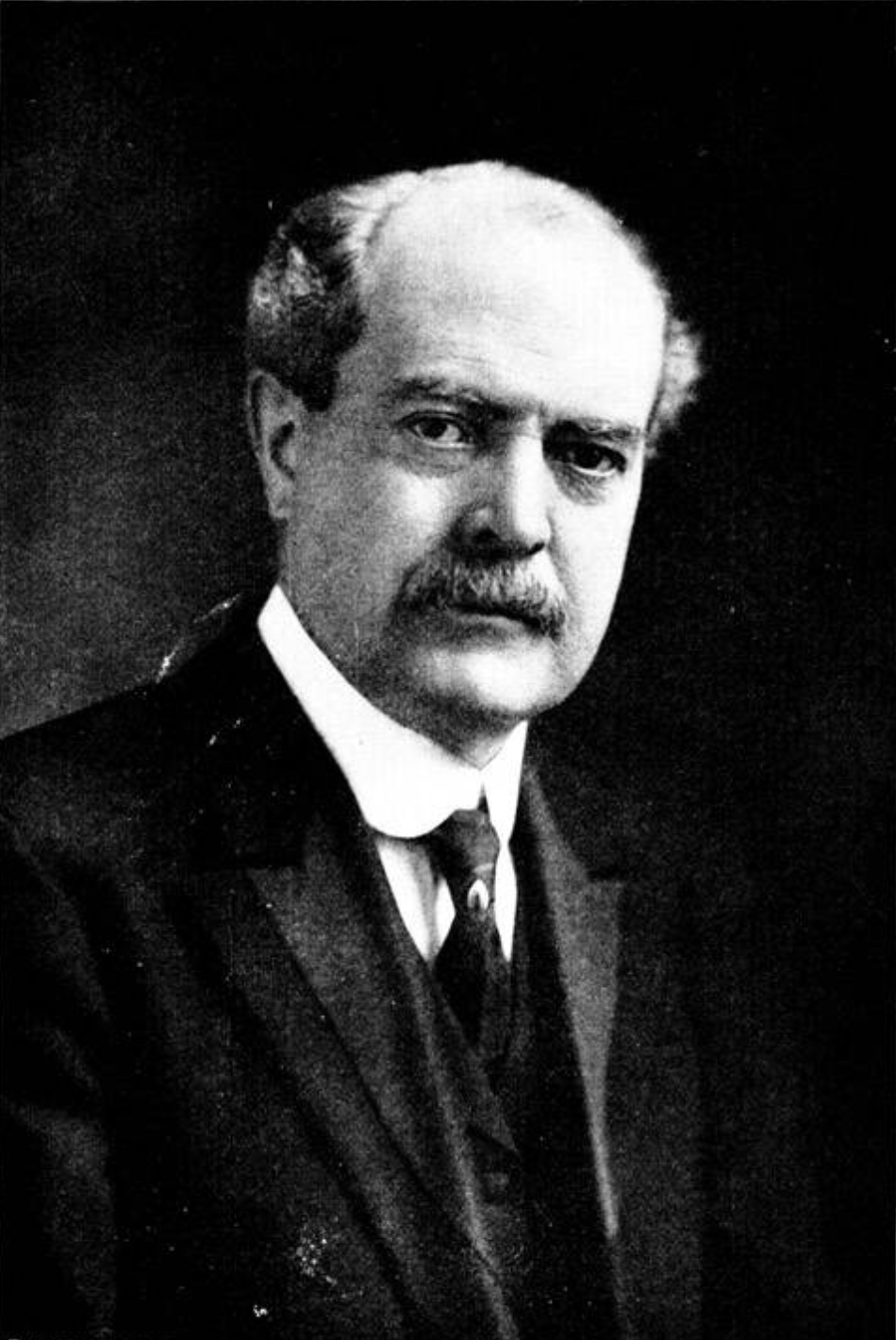
Dunne's official portrait as Governor of Illinois

Dunne formally announced his candidacy for Governor of Illinois on January 17, 1912. He won the Democratic Party primary election held on April 9 of that year. The main thrust of his campaign attack was on what he called "Jackpot Government". In the November general election, Dunne defeated the incumbent governor, Charles S. Deneen. Dunne and the Democrats benefited from the split in the ranks of the Republican Party which divided by supporters of the incumbent President William Howard Taft and the Progressives who supported the third party candidacy of Theodore Roosevelt.

He was inaugurated as Governor of Illinois on February 3, 1913. He moved his family to the Illinois Governor's Mansion in Springfield, Illinois. As governor, he met with many visitors and guests. Former U.S. President Theodore "Teddy" Roosevelt was a visitor at the Illinois Governor's Mansion while Dunne was governor.

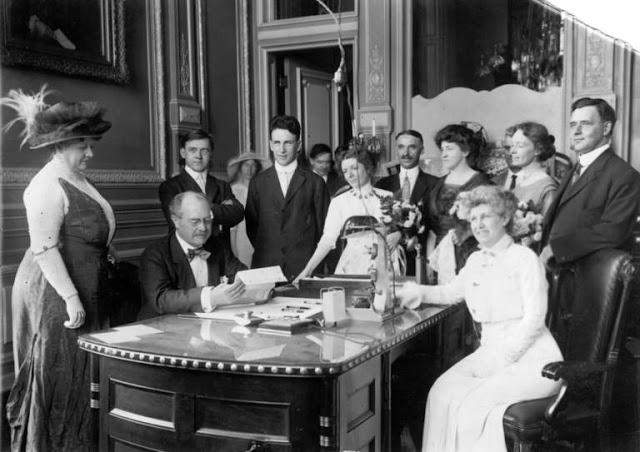
Dunne signs a bill granting women suffrage in Illinois on June 26, 1913

As governor Dunne championed numerous progressive reforms, including Women's Suffrage, prison reforms, major infrastructural improvements, the creation of the Public Utility Commission, the Efficiency and Economy Commission, the Legislative Reference Bureau, and he also expanded the state's responsibility for overseeing workman's compensation benefits and teachers' pensions.

In 1913, Dunne signed into law a bill that gave women in the State of Illinois the right to vote for President of the United States. This made Illinois the first state east of the Mississippi to give women the right to vote for the U.S. presidency. This was six years before the passage of the 19th Amendment.

In November 1915, Dunne designated state Senator Stephen D. Canady of Hillsboro to appear as his representative on the train car along with the Liberty Bell as it passed through southern Illinois on its nationwide tour returning to Pennsylvania from the Panama-Pacific International Exposition in San Francisco. After that trip, the Liberty Bell returned to Pennsylvania and will not be moved again.

=== Good roads ===
In 1905 Illinois had 90,000 miles of dirt roads—locally built as cheaply as possible and badly maintained. Most farmers were frozen in place for weeks at a time in the muddy season. In the 1890s bicyclists organized and demanded good roads. After 1900 automobiles started appearing, and experts at the University of Illinois demonstrated that concrete roads were needed. The dilemma was the downstate Republican coalition. There were multiple well-organized factions; each wanted someone else to pay more of the cost. Study after study was made, and almost no roads were upgraded. Edward Dunne was elected governor in 1912 when the Republicans split between Taft and a new party under Roosevelt. Dunne was a Chicago Democrat, and was not beholden to any of the downstate factions. He realized that good roads would dramatically enhance the Chicago economy, as farmers shipped their crops and animals more cheaply to Chicago. In turn, they would buy their household goods mail order from Montgomery Ward and Sears Roebuck based in Chicago. Paved roads would benefit, to a greater or lesser extent, all of the downstate factions. Dunne's solution was to impose a new plan that most of the downstate factions could support, pouring in millions of dollars of state money in a long-term program that would upgrade the roads in every county in Illinois. Furthermore, when Democrat Woodrow Wilson became president in 1913, Dunne helped convince Congress to add federal money to the spending on roads. Good roads became a national priority, and by the 1920s it was a major boost to the economy as the United States took the world lead in automobiles and in good roads.

== Post-gubernatorial career ==
In 1919, Dunne traveled to the Paris Peace Conference to lobby President Woodrow Wilson to consider Irish independence to be a cause in keeping with the principle of self-determination that Wilson had advocated for in his "Fourteen Points".

After finishing his term as governor, Dunne remained politically active. In 1921, he helped found an organization called the "National Unity Council" to combat the Ku Klux Klan.

"In view of the fact that the Ku Klux Klan has adopted the weapon of mass action, it was our desire to organize a society which shall develop harmony and good feeling between different classes, rather than enmity," Mr. Dunne said today. "Invitations were sent to many prominent church, political, business and welfare men, and the replies are coming in now...." The Ku Klux Klan, which maintains an office here under the name of the "Southern Publicity Bureau" was called "a menace to this and any community" by former Governor Dunne in their adoption of the "equipment of burglar masks and implements of violence."

In 1919, Dunne was appointed by the Irish Race Convention to serve on the American Commission on Irish Independence. As part of this commission, Dunne traveled to the Paris Peace Conference of 1919 in order to voice Irish-American desires for an independent Irish nation. During his stay in Europe, he also visited Ireland itself. He spent ten days touring the island and meeting with politicians including members of the First Dáil on May 9, 1919.

Dunne returned once again to practicing law after leaving office in 1917. His legal practice was damaged by the ravages of the Great Depression, but he supplemented this work with a position as counsel to the Cook County Board of Election Commissioners.

After the death of his wife on May 25, 1928, Dunne began contemplating his memoirs. He was convinced by the Lewis Publishing Co. to write a history of Illinois. Over a five-year period he worked on this project with close help from William L. Sullivan, who had been his private secretary when he was governor. In 1933, he published a five (5) volume set titled: Illinois, the Heart of the Nation.

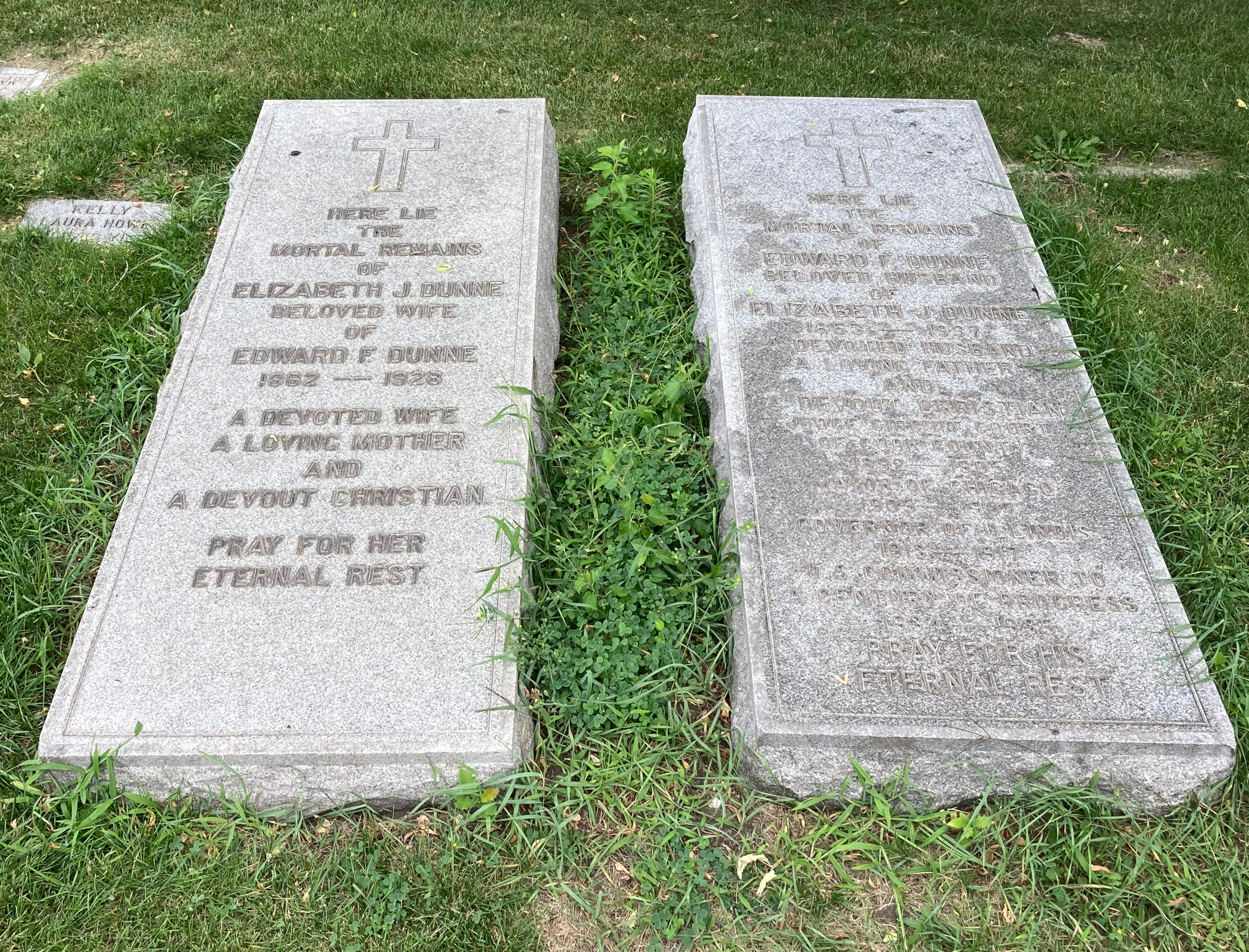
Dunne's grave at Calvary Cemetery

President Franklin Roosevelt appointed Dunne to be a United States Commissioner for the Century of Progress World's Fair of Chicago of 1933–34. At the time he was 80 years old. He took great joy in this position and joked that he had served as mayor, governor, and as a federal commissioner (and, thus, had served at all levels of government).

== Death ==
In his later years, Dunne lived with his oldest daughter, Eileen and her family. He died in Chicago on May 24, 1937, aged 83. He was surrounded by three of his nine children when he died. He is buried alongside his wife, Elizabeth, at Calvary Cemetery in Evanston. Dunne's family today resides in Chicago, Connecticut, and New Jersey.

== See also ==
- Chicago Traction Wars

Party political offices
Preceded by Adlai Stevenson I	Democratic nominee for Governor of Illinois; 1912, 1916	Succeeded by J. Hamilton Lewis
