= 1912 Illinois lieutenant gubernatorial election =

- November 5, 1912
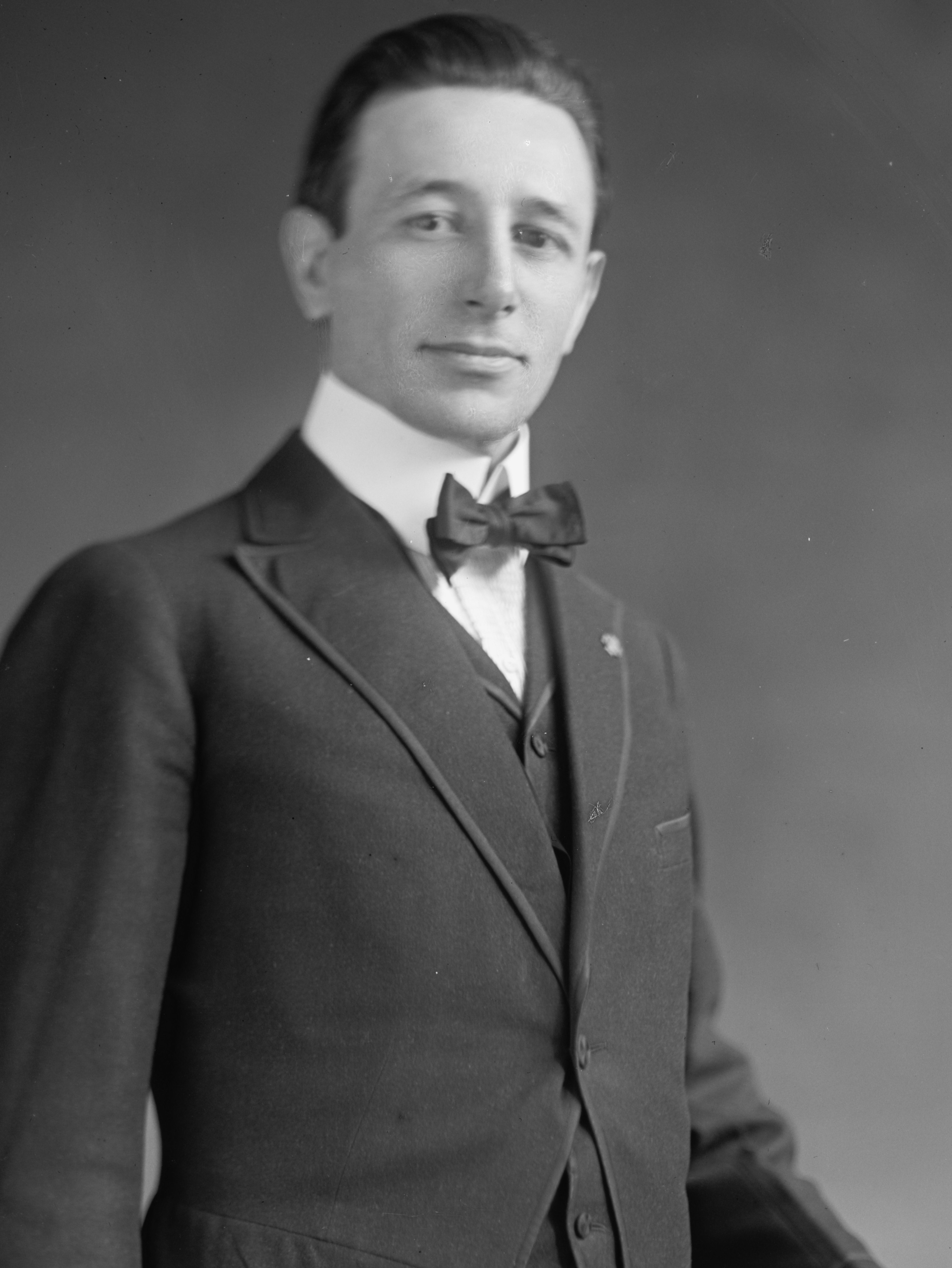

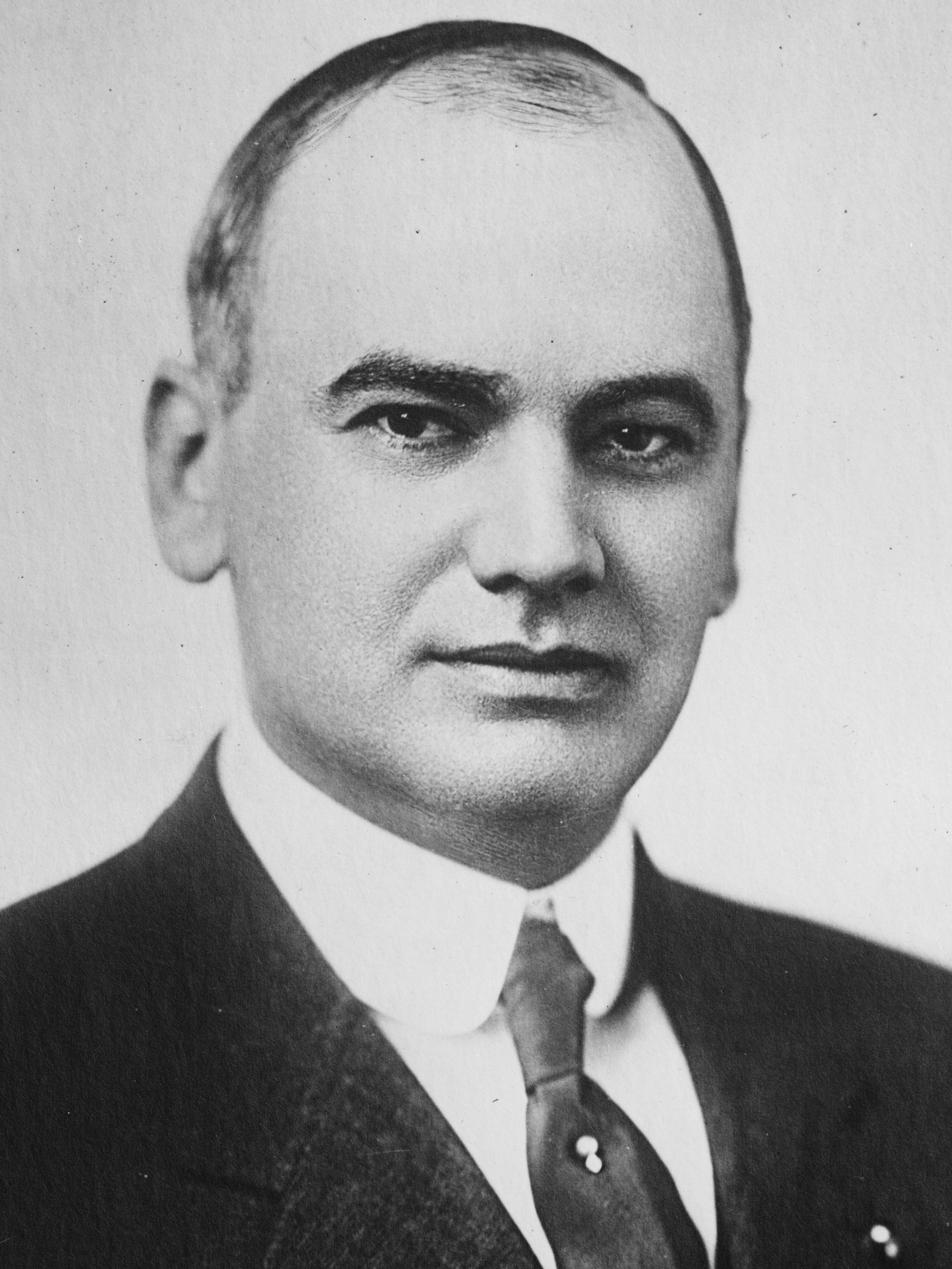

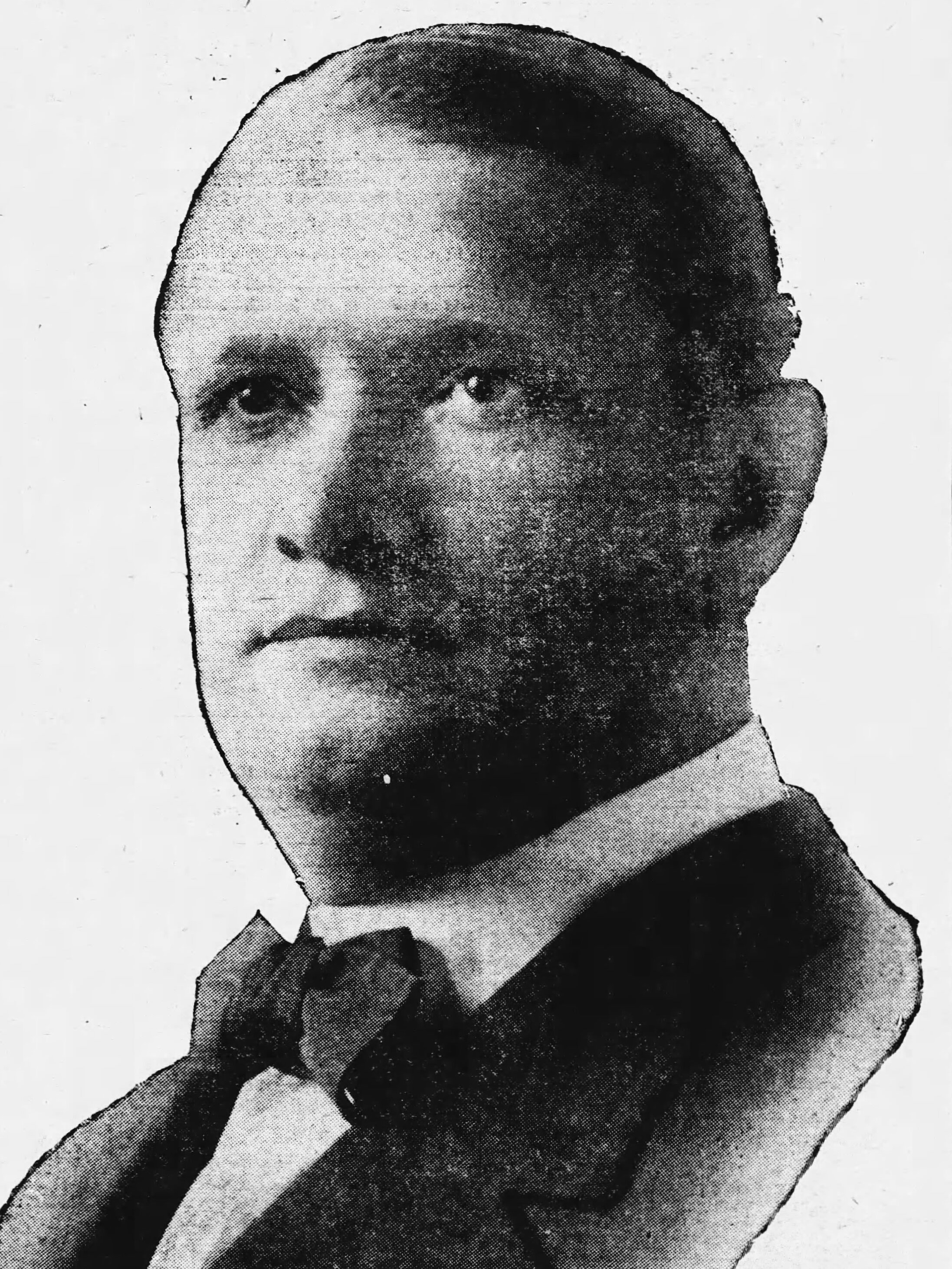

Nominee	Barratt O'Hara	John G. Oglesby
Party	Democratic	Republican
Popular vote	407,243	316,813
Percentage	40.91%	27.75%
Nominee	Dean Franklin	F. T. Maxwell
Party	Progressive	Socialist
Popular vote	315,589	82,655
Percentage	27.64%	7.24%
Lieutenant Governor before election
John G. Oglesby
Republican
Elected Lieutenant Governor
Barratt O'Hara
Democratic

The 1912 Illinois lieutenant gubernatorial election was held on November 5, 1912. Incumbent first-term Republican lieutenant governor John G. Oglesby was defeated by Democratic nominee Barratt O'Hara.

== Primary elections ==
Primary elections were held on April 9, 1912.

=== Democratic primary ===
==== Candidates ====
- Frank D. Comerford, former State Senator
- Charles C. Craig, former State Representative
- Adlai T. Ewing, President of the Iroquois Club of Chicago
- William E. Golden
- Barratt O'Hara, editor of the Chicago Magazine and Sunday Telegram
- J. L. Pickering Sr.
- Gustavus T. Tatge, former Cook County State's attorney

==== Results ====
Democratic primary results
Party	Candidate	Votes	%
Democratic	Barratt O'Hara	56,518	21.65
Democratic	Frank D. Comerford	54,321	20.80
Democratic	Charles C. Craig	48,034	18.40
Democratic	Gustavus T. Tatge	36,371	13.93
Democratic	William E. Golden	24,644	9.44
Democratic	J. L. Pickering, Sr.	24,427	9.36
Democratic	Adlai T. Ewing	16,792	6.43
Total votes		261,107	100.00

=== Republican primary ===
==== Candidates ====
- John G. Oglesby, incumbent Lieutenant Governor
- Kinnie A. Ostewig
- Reuben R. Tiffany

==== Results ====
Republican primary results
Party	Candidate	Votes	%
Republican	John G. Oglesby (incumbent)	275,626	72.47
Republican	Reuben R. Tiffany	74,198	19.51
Republican	Kinnie A. Ostewig	30,498	8.02
Total votes		380,322	100.00

=== Prohibition primary ===
==== Candidates ====
- Jacob H. Hoofstitler

==== Results ====
Prohibition primary results
Party	Candidate	Votes	%
Prohibition	Jacob H. Hoofstitler	3,547	100.00
Total votes		3,547	100.00

=== Socialist primary ===
==== Candidates ====
- F. T. Maxwell

==== Results ====
Socialist primary results
Party	Candidate	Votes	%
Socialist	F. T. Maxwell	8,026	100.00
Total votes		8,026	100.00

== General election ==
=== Candidates ===
- Dean Franklin, Progressives for S.J., Macomb municipal judge
- Jacob H. Hoofstitler, Prohibition
- F. T. Maxwell, Socialist
- Barratt O'Hara, Democratic
- John G. Oglesby, Republican
- Gottlieb Renner, Socialist Labor

=== Results ===
1912 Illinois lieutenant gubernatorial election
Party	Candidate	Votes	%	±%
Democratic	Barratt O'Hara	407,243	40.91%	
Republican	John G. Oglesby (incumbent)	316,813	27.75%	
Progressive	Dean Franklin	315,589	27.64%	
Socialist	F. T. Maxwell	82,655	7.24%	
Prohibition	Jacob H. Hoofstitler	15,342	1.34%	
Socialist Labor	Gottlieb Renner	4,121	0.36%	
Majority		90,430	7.92%	
Turnout		1,141,763	100.00%	
Democratic gain from Republican		Swing		

== See also ==
- 1912 Illinois gubernatorial election

== Bibliography ==
- Compiled by Harry Woods, Secretary of State (1914). Blue Book of the State of Illinois, 1913-14. Danville, Illinois: Illinois Printing Company.
- Compiled by Cornelius J. Doyle, Secretary of State (1912). Official vote of the State of Illinois cast at the Primary Election held on April 9, 1912. Springfield, Illinois: Illinois State Journal Co., State Printers.
- Compiled by Cornelius J. Doyle, Secretary of State (1913). Official vote of the State of Illinois cast at the Election, November 5, 1912; Judicial Election, June 3, 1912; Special Elections, 1911 and 1912. Springfield, Illinois: Illinois State Journal Co., State Printers.
