= National Register of Historic Places listings in Walker County, Alabama =

Location of Walker County in Alabama

This is a list of the National Register of Historic Places listings in Walker County, Alabama.

This is intended to be a complete list of the properties and districts on the National Register of Historic Places in Walker County, Alabama, United States. Latitude and longitude coordinates are provided for many National Register properties and districts; these locations may be seen together in an online map.

There are eight properties and districts listed on the National Register in the county.

This National Park Service list is complete through NPS recent listings posted May 1, 2026.

	Name on the Register	Image	Date listed	Location	City or town	Description
1	Bankhead House	Bankhead House	June 18, 1973 (#73000375)	1400 7th Ave. 33°50′15″N 87°16′59″W	Jasper	
2	William Brockman Bankhead House	William Brockman Bankhead House	June 30, 2022 (#100007850)	800 7th St. West; 33°50′42″N 87°17′04″W	Jasper	
3	Boshell's Mill	Boshell's Mill	May 30, 1975 (#75000329)	North of Townley on State Route 124; 33°51′17″N 87°26′51″W	Townley	
4	First United Methodist Church	First United Methodist Church	February 14, 1985 (#85000257)	1800 3rd Ave. 33°50′01″N 87°16′40″W	Jasper	
5	Gilchrist House		March 24, 1972 (#72000188)	12 miles southwest of Cordova on Pleasantfield-Evansbridge Rd. 33°38′04″N 87°21′23″W	Cordova	Built in 1812, destroyed by fire in 1990s.
6	Jasper Downtown Historic District	Jasper Downtown Historic District	March 31, 2004 (#04000233)	Roughly bounded by 17th St., Corona Ave., 20th St., and 8th Ave. 33°49′54″N 87°16′44″W	Jasper	
7	Stephenson House	Stephenson House	September 18, 1978 (#78000510)	Cobb St. 33°42′54″N 87°23′16″W	Oakman	
8	Walker County Hospital	Walker County Hospital	May 30, 1985 (#85001160)	1100 7th Ave. 33°50′26″N 87°16′59″W	Jasper	

== See also ==
- List of National Historic Landmarks in Alabama
- National Register of Historic Places listings in Alabama
