= James Freeman =

James Freeman or Jim Freeman may refer to:

== Arts and entertainment ==
- James E. Freeman (painter) (1810–1884), American painter
- James Dillet Freeman (1912–2003), Native American poet
- James Freeman (conductor) (born 1939), American musical conductor

== Religion ==
- James Freeman (clergyman) (1759–1835), American Unitarian clergyman
- James Midwinter Freeman (1827–1900), American clergyman
- James E. Freeman (bishop) (1866–1943), American Episcopal bishop
- James Darcy Freeman (1907–1991), Australian Roman Catholic cardinal

== Sports ==
- Jim Freeman (Australian footballer) (1889–1956), Australian rules footballer
- James Freeman (cyclist) (1891–1951), American cyclist
- Jim Freeman (American football) (1914–2015), American football coach
- James Freeman (swimmer) (born 2001), Botswana swimmer

== Others ==
- James C. Freeman (1820–1885), United States Congressman
- James W. Freeman (1842–1895), American politician in Wisconsin
- James Stanley Freeman (1874–1960), American businessman
- James Shepherd Freeman (1900–1962), American Naval officer
- James M. Freeman (born 1936), American anthropologist
- James Garrett Freeman (1980–2016), American criminal
- James Freeman (journalist), American economic journalist

== See also ==
- James Freeman Clarke (1810–1888), American theologian and author
- James Freedman (disambiguation)
