= Stephenson House =

Stephenson House may refer to:

in Australia

- Gordon Stephenson House, an office building in Perth, Australia

in Canada

- Stephenson House (University of Toronto)

in the United States

- Stephenson House (Oakman, Alabama), listed on the NRHP in Walker County, Alabama
- Aday-Stephenson House, Marshall, Arkansas, listed on the NRHP in Searcy County, Arkansas
- Stephenson House (Round Hill, Kentucky), listed on the NRHP in Madison County, Kentucky
- Benjamin Stephenson House, Edwardsville, Illinois, NRHP-listed
- Stephenson-Allen House, Enterprise, Mississippi, listed on the NRHP in Clarke County, Mississippi
- Stephenson-Campbell House, Cecil, Pennsylvania, NRHP-listed
- Oakland (Parkersburg, West Virginia), also known as the Stephenson House, NRHP-listed

== See also ==
- Stevenson House (disambiguation)
