= William Brockman Bankhead House =

Historic house in Alabama, United States

- U.S. National Register of Historic Places
- Alabama Register of Landmarks and Heritage
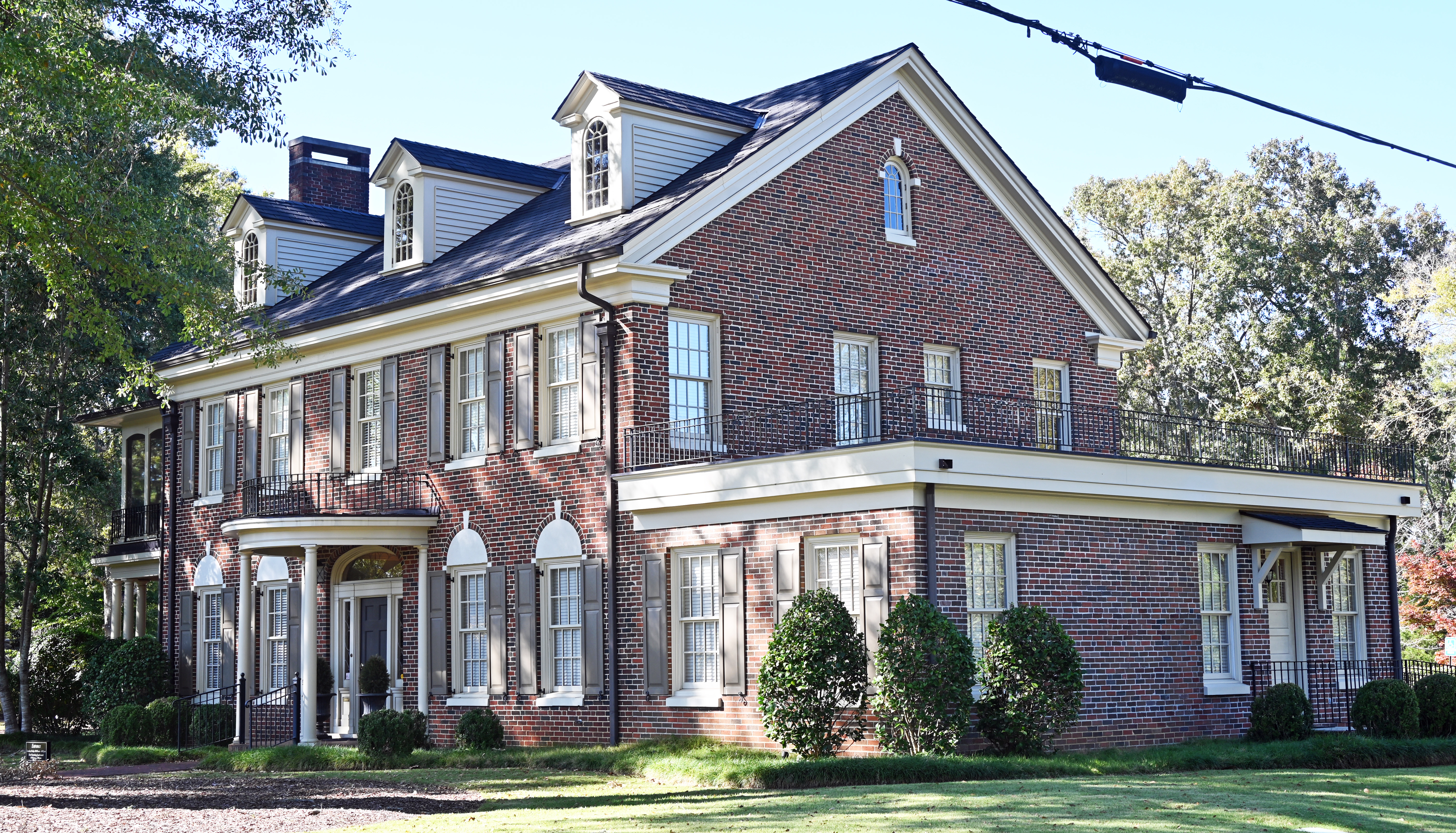

- Location within Alabama Location within the United States
- Location: 800 7th Street West
- Nearest city: Jasper, Alabama
- Coordinates: 33.8450°N 87.2844°W
- Built: 1925
- NRHP reference No.: 100007850

Significant dates
- Added to NRHP: June 30, 2022
- Designated ARLH: February 21, 2013

The William Brockman Bankhead House in Jasper, Alabama, was built in 1925. It was listed on the National Register of Historic Places on June 30, 2022.

A member of the Democratic party, Bankhead (1874–1940) represented Alabama in the United States House of Representatives, alternately in the 7th and 10th Congressional districts, March 4, 1917 – September 15, 1940. He was elected to be the 42nd speaker of the United States House of Representatives in 1936, serving in that position for the remainder of his service in Congress. In August 1937, his actress daughter Tallulah Bankhead wed fellow actor John Emery in this house.

Following Congressman Bankhead's 1940 death, the house went on the market. Subsequent owners were slacking in upkeep of the property. The Walker Area Community Foundation, aided by private donations, stepped in and rescued the property from its state of disrepair. In the year 2010, financier John T. Oliver Jr., who had married Congressman Bankhead's great niece Barbara Bankhead, created the Bankhead House & Heritage Center charitable organization for the purpose of restoring the property.
