= Margaret Stevenson =

Margaret Stevenson may refer to:

- Margaret Rooke Stevenson (1706–1783), English landlady of Benjamin Franklin
- Margaret Stevenson (satirist) (c. 1807 – 1874), English-Australian writer
- Margaret Beveridge Stevenson (1865–1941), New Zealand member of the Baháʼí Faith
- Margaret Stevenson Miller (1896–1979), British feminist
- Margot Stevenson (1912–2011), American actor
- Margaret Kirchner Stevenson (1920–1998), American pilot
- Peggy Stevenson (1924–2014), American politician

== See also ==
- Samuel A. and Margaret Stevenson House
