= SS Mormacdove =

Three ships of the Moore-McCormack companies have borne the name Mormacdove

- SS Mormacdove (1939) was launched in 1939 as a Type C2 ship. She was acquired by the US Navy in 1941 as an Arcturus-class attack cargo ship and renamed USS Alchiba. She was decommissioned in 1946, sold into civilian service in 1948 as the Tjipanas, renamed Tong Jit in 1967 and scrapped in 1973.
- SS Mormacdove (1942) was launched 1 June 1942 at the Consolidated Steel Corporation's Wilmington, California yard as a Type C1-B ship, but completed as a War Shipping Administration troop transport. She was transferred to the United States Maritime Commission in 1946 and was scrapped in 1965.
- SS Mormacdove (1944) was launched in 1944 as a Type C2-S-B1 ship under the name Ringleader. She was purchased in 1947 and named Mormacdove and was scrapped in 1968.
