= Gilchrist House =

Gilchrist House may refer to:

- Gilchrist House (Cordova, Alabama)
- A. C. Freeman House, Punta Gorda, Florida, known also as Gilchrist House
- Stevens-Gilchrist House, Sarasota, Florida
- Werner-Gilchrist House, Albuquerque, New Mexico
- Capt. Gilchrist House, Vermilion, Ohio, listed on the National Register of Historic Places in Erie County, Ohio
- Capt. Gilchrist Sr. House, Vermilion, Ohio, listed on the National Register of Historic Places in Erie County, Ohio
