= Athletics at the 2026 Asian Games – Men's pole vault =

Men's pole Vault at the 2026 Asian Games
- Venue: Mizuho Park Athletic Stadium, Nagoya
- Date: 29 September 2026
- Competitors: 12 from 8 nations
- Winning height: 5.91 m GR

Medalists
gold medal	Ernest Obiena	Philippines
silver medal	Yao Jie	China
bronze medal	Li Chenyang	China

The men's pole vault competition at the 2026 Asian Games took place on 29 September 2026 at the Mizuho Park Athletics Stadium, Nagoya. The event was competed by 12 competitors from eight nations. Ernest Obiena of Phulippines won the gold with a jump of 5.91 m (19.4 ft). He broke his own Asian Games record of 5.90 m (19.4 ft) set during the previous Games in Hangzhou. Yao Jie and Li Chenyang of China won the silver and bronze medals respectively.

== Background ==
The men's pole vault event was first contested at the inaugural Asian Games in 1951. It has been contested at every edition of the Asian Games since then.

The defending champion was the Philippines' Ernest John Obiena, who won the gold medal at the 2022 Asian Games, with a clearance of 5.90 m (19.4 ft), setting a new Games record. Obiena also held the Asian record in the event with a jump of 6.00 m (19.69 ft), achieved at the Bergen Jump Challenge in Norway on 10 June 2023, which he equalled at the 2023 World Athletics Championships in Budapest in August 2023. Coming into the 2026 Asian Games, he had a season's best of 5.91 m (19.4 ft), set at the Golden Sand meet in Międzyzdroje, Poland, in August 2026.

Qatar's Seifeldin Abdelsalam was Obiena's closest challenger, having cleared 5.90 m (19.4 ft) on 20 August 2026 to set a personal and national record. China's Li Chenyang set a personal best and Chinese national record of 5.86 m (19.2 ft) in March 2026. He had won the silver medal behind Obiena at the 2026 Asian Indoor Athletics Championships. China's Yao Jie was a two time Asian Games medalist, having won the silver medal at the 2018 Asian Games and finished fourth at the 2022 Asian Games, clearing 5.55 m (18.2 ft) on both occasions.

Other competitors included Saudi Arabia's Hussain Asim Al Hizam, who won the bronze at the 2022 Asian Games with a jump of 5.65 m (18.5 ft), Thailand's Patsapong Amsam-Ang, who had finished fourth in the 2022 event with a jump of 5.55 m (18.2 ft). Amsam-Ang had also won the bronze medal at the 2018 Asian Games. India was represented by Dev Meena and Kuldeep Kumar, who both cleared 5.45 m (17.9 ft) at the National Federation Cup in Ranchi. Meena subsequently set a new national record of 5.46 m (17.9 ft) at the National Inter-State Athletics Championships in June 2026.

== Schedule ==
The medalists in the men's pole vault event was decided in a single final on 29 September 2026 held at the Mizuho Park Athletics Stadium in Nagoya.

All times are Japan Standard Time (UTC+09:00)

Schedule
Date	Time	Event
29 September 2026	18:20	Final

== Records ==
Prior to this competition, the existing world, Asian and Games records were as follows.

World Record	Armand Duplantis (SWE)	6.30	Tokyo, Japan	14 September 2025
Asian Record	EJ Obiena (PHI)	6.00	Bergen, Norway; Budapest, Hungary	10 June 2023; 26 August 2023
Games Record	EJ Obiena (PHI)	5.90	Hangzhou, China	29 September 2023

== Summary ==
The event was held under rainy conditions. The event was competed by 12 competitors from eight nations.

Obiena won the gold medal and surpassed his own Asian Games record with a jump of 5.91 m (19.4 ft). Having won the competition with a jump of 5.75 m (18.9 ft), he attempted to improve his own Games record. After two unsuccessful attempts at 5.80 m (19.0 ft), he cleared 5.91 m (19.4 ft) on his first attempt, setting a new Asian Games record.

Yao Jie and Li Chenyang both cleared 5.70 m (18.7 ft), but Yao secured the silver medal on countback as Li Chenyang had a failed attempt during his first jump of 5.50 m (18.0 ft). Amsamang finished fourth with a new season's best of 5.60 m (18.4 ft). Dev Meena finished seventh with a clearance of 5.50 m (18.0 ft), and set a new Indian national record and personal best.

== Results ==
Rank	Athlete	Attempt											Result	Notes
Rank	Athlete	5.05	5.20	5.35	5.50	5.60	5.70	5.75	5.80	5.85	5.90	5.91	Result	Notes
1st place, gold medalist(s)	EJ Obiena (PHI)	–	–	–	O	–	O	O	XX–	–	–	O	5.91	GR
2nd place, silver medalist(s)	Yao Jie (CHN)	–	–	O	O	O	O	XXX					5.70	
3rd place, bronze medalist(s)	Li Chenyang (CHN)	–	–	–	XO	O	O	X–	XX				5.70	
4	Patsapong Amsam-ang (THA)	–	–	O	O	O	X–	XX					5.60	=SB
5	Seif Heneida (QAT)	–	–	–	O	XXX							5.50	
6	Wu Yan-han (TPE)	O	O	XO	O	XXX							5.50	
7	Dev Meena (IND)	–	XO	O	XO	XXX							5.50	NR
8	Hussain Al-Hizam (KSA)	–	–	XO	XXO	X–	–	XX					5.50	
9	Tomoya Karasawa (JPN)	–	O	XO	XXX								5.35	
10	Kuldeep Kumar (IND)	O	XO	XXO	XXX								5.35	
11	Masaki Ejima (JPN)	–	XXO	XXX									5.25	
12	Huang Yong-fu (TPE)	XXO	XXX										5.05	
