= Stevenson House =

Stevenson House may refer to:

- Stevenson House, East Lothian, Scotland
- Stevenson House (Monterey, California), listed on the National Register of Historic Places (NRHP)
- Stevenson House and Brickyard, Lavonia, Georgia, listed on the NRHP in Franklin County, Georgia
- Birthplace of Adlai E. Stevenson II, Los Angeles, Los Angeles County, California — where Adlai Stevenson I was born in 1900
- Dodson–Stevenson House, also known as the Adlai Stevenson I House, on North McLean Street on Franklin Square (Bloomington, Illinois), McLean County, Illinois — an 1869 house where Adlai Stevenson I lived
- Stevenson House (Bloomington, Illinois), also known as the Adlai E. Stevenson II House, on East Washington Street in Bloomington, McLean County, Illinois — where Adlai Stevenson II lived from 1906
- Adlai E. Stevenson I House, Metamora, Woodford County, Illinois — where Adlai Stevenson I lived from 1866
- Adlai E. Stevenson II Farm, also known as the Adlai E. Stevenson Historic Home, in Mettawa, Lake County, Illinois — where Adlai Stevenson II lived from 1936 to 1965
- Kimball–Stevenson House, Davenport, Iowa, NRHP-listed
- Samuel A. and Margaret Stevenson House, Des Moines, Iowa, listed on the NRHP in Polk County, Iowa
- Henry Stevenson House, Georgetown, Kentucky, listed on the NRHP in Scott County, Kentucky
- Dr. John E. Stevenson House, Union, Kentucky, listed on the NRHP in Boone County, Kentucky
- Stevenson House (Hammond, Louisiana), listed on the NRHP in Tangipahoa Parish, Louisiana
- Stevenson House (Battle Creek, Michigan), a Michigan State Historic Site in Calhoun County
- Stevenson Cottage, Saranac Lake, New York, NRHP-listed
- Stevenson House (New Bern, North Carolina), in Craven County, NRHP-listed
- Joshua Stevenson House, Canal Winchester, Ohio, listed on the NRHP in Franklin County, Ohio
- Dr. William P. Stevenson House, Maryville, Tennessee, listed on the NRHP in Blount County, Tennessee
- Joseph R. and Mary M. Stevenson House, Houston, Texas, listed on the NRHP in Harris County, Texas
- Douglass–Stevenson House, Fontana, Wisconsin, listed on the NRHP in Walworth County, Wisconsin

== See also ==
- Stephenson House (disambiguation)
