= Center for Advanced Study in the Behavioral Sciences at Stanford University =

Research center at Stanford University

Coordinates: 37.420515°N 122.18016°W

- Abbreviation: CASBS
- Founded: 1954
- Headquarters: Palo Alto, California
- Location: Stanford University
- Director: Mariano-Florentino Cuellar
- Website: casbs.stanford.edu

The Center for Advanced Study in the Behavioral Sciences at Stanford University (CASBS) is an independent research institute of the Policy and Social Sciences Academic Units at Stanford University. The center is located in Palo Alto, California, United States.

Established with a founding grant from the Ford Foundation, the Center began operations in 1954 with a purpose "to increase knowledge of factors which influence or determine human conduct, and extend such knowledge for the maximum benefit of individuals and society." The Center hosts fellows from throughout the world, organizes multi-year projects addressing societal challenges and advancing research methods, and disseminates knowledge about social and behavioral science.

CASBS fellows are drawn from a variety of fields, including "the five core social and behavioral disciplines of anthropology, economics, political science, psychology, and sociology". In recent decades, the Center has also hosted legal scholars, humanists, public policy practitioners, philosophers, medical researchers and practitioners, and technology experts among others. CASBS fellows over the years include more than 30 Nobel laureates, 52 MacArthur fellows, and 1 U.S. Supreme Court justice.

It is one of the members of Some Institutes for Advanced Study (SIAS), a consortium of institutions throughout the world dedicated to advanced interdisciplinary research. The Center's hilltop campus of ten buildings provides 19,600 square feet (1,820 m^{2}) of space, offering ample room for hosting teams of researchers, meetings for practitioners and scientists, and individual scholars.

== History ==
The Center was founded in 1954 by the Ford Foundation. The American educator Ralph W. Tyler served as the center's first director from 1954 to 1966. Political scientist Margaret Levi was the director of the center from 2014 until 2022. Former directors also include Claude Steele (2004-2009), who became Provost of Columbia University and the University of California, Berkeley; and Sarah Soule (2023-2025), who became Dean of the Stanford Graduate School of Business.

The CASBS buildings were designed by William Wurster, a local architect who served as dean of MIT’s School of Architecture and Planning.

Earlier, fellow selection was a closed process; new fellows were nominated by former fellows. However, since 2007, the center opened up the fellow selection process to applications. In 2008, it became an integral part of Stanford University and functions as one of the university's independent research institutes.

== Fellows ==
Each class of fellows numbers about 40 people. In the first 40 years of its existence it supported about 2,000 scientists and scholars.

=== Notable fellows ===
The institute has been home to notable scholars, including:

- Paul S. Appelbaum
- Alexander Astin
- Leora Auslander
- Ludwig von Bertalanffy
- Anthony Bebbington
- Jamshed Bharucha
- Derek Bok
- Kenneth Boulding
- Justine Cassell
- Ruth Chang
- Dorothy Cheney
- David Clark
- Leda Cosmides
- Kimberlé Crenshaw
- Shmuel Noah Eisenstadt
- Yehuda Elkana
- Robert H. Frank
- James M. Freeman
- Harold Garfinkel
- Henry Louis Gates
- Ralph W. Gerard
- Ruth Bader Ginsburg
- Noam Gidron
- Mark Granovetter
- Adriaan de Groot
- Lani Guinier
- Leopold H. Haimson
- Eszter Hargittai
- John Haugeland
- Kieran Healy
- Miles Hewstone
- Douglas Hofstadter
- Philip N. Howard
- Katherine Isbister
- Murray Jarvik
- Lee Jussim
- Daniel Kahneman
- Robert Kates
- Elihu Katz
- Thomas Kuhn
- Terra Lawson-Remer
- Catharine MacKinnon
- Michael Macy
- George Mandler
- Paul Milgrom
- Elijah Millgram
- Ernest Nagel
- Rodney Needham
- Don Norman
- Robert Nozick
- Margaret O'Mara
- Karl H. Pribram
- Anatol Rapoport
- John Rawls
- Julie Reuben
- Edward Said
- Richard Sennett
- Andrea diSessa
- Bradd Shore
- Sidney Siegel
- Neil Smelser
- Vernon L. Smith
- Richard C. Snyder
- Thomas Sowell
- Herman D. Stein
- Li Chenyang
- Deborah Tannen
- Bethany Teachman
- Charles Tilly
- John Tooby
- Edward Tufte
- Billie Lee Turner II
- France Winddance Twine
- Vanessa C. Tyson
- Philip E. Vernon
- Gordon S. Wood
- Irvin Yalom
- Benjamin Mako Hill
