= Brian Nosek =

American social psychologist

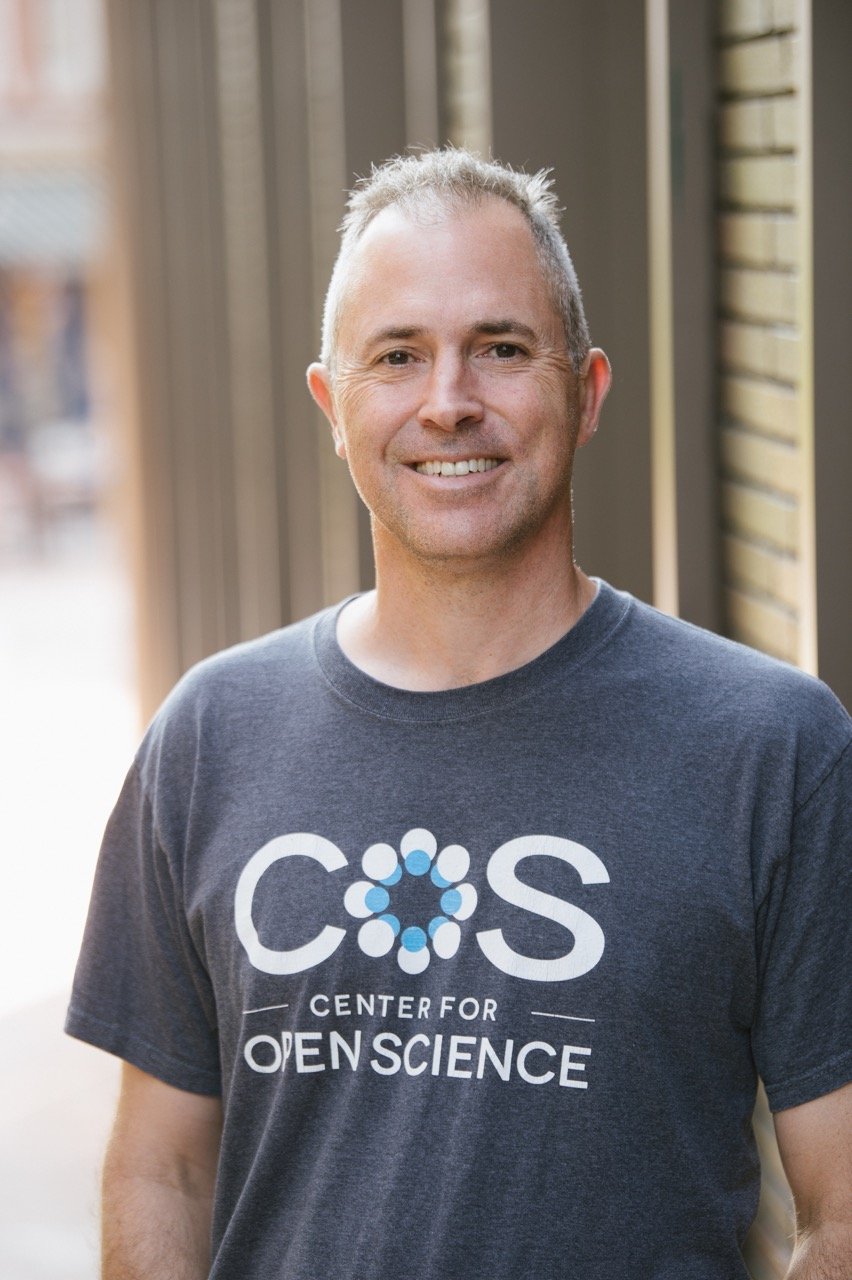
- Nosek in 2022
- Education: California Polytechnic State University (BS); Yale University (MS, MPhil, PhD)
- Spouse: Bethany Teachman
- Awards: Fellow of the Association for Psychological Science
- Scientific career
- Fields: Psychology, Metascience
- Institutions: University of Virginia
- Thesis: Moderators of the relationship between implicit and explicit attitudes (2002)
- Doctoral advisor: Mahzarin Banaji

Brian Arthur Nosek is an American social-cognitive psychologist, professor of psychology at the University of Virginia, and the co-founder and director of the Center for Open Science. He also co-founded the Society for the Improvement of Psychological Science and Project Implicit. He has been on the faculty of the University of Virginia since 2002.

== Education ==
Nosek received his B.S. from California Polytechnic State University in 1995, and his M.S., M.Phil., and Ph.D. from Yale University in 1998, 1999, and 2002, respectively.

== Work ==
In 2011, Nosek and his collaborators set up the Reproducibility Project, with the aim of trying to replicate the results of 100 psychological experiments published in respected journals in 2008. In 2015, their results were published in Science, and found that only 36 out of the 100 replications showed statistically significant results, compared with 97 of the 100 original experiments. In 2014 Nosek was guest-editor of a special issue of the journal Social Psychology dedicated to the publication of preregistered replications.

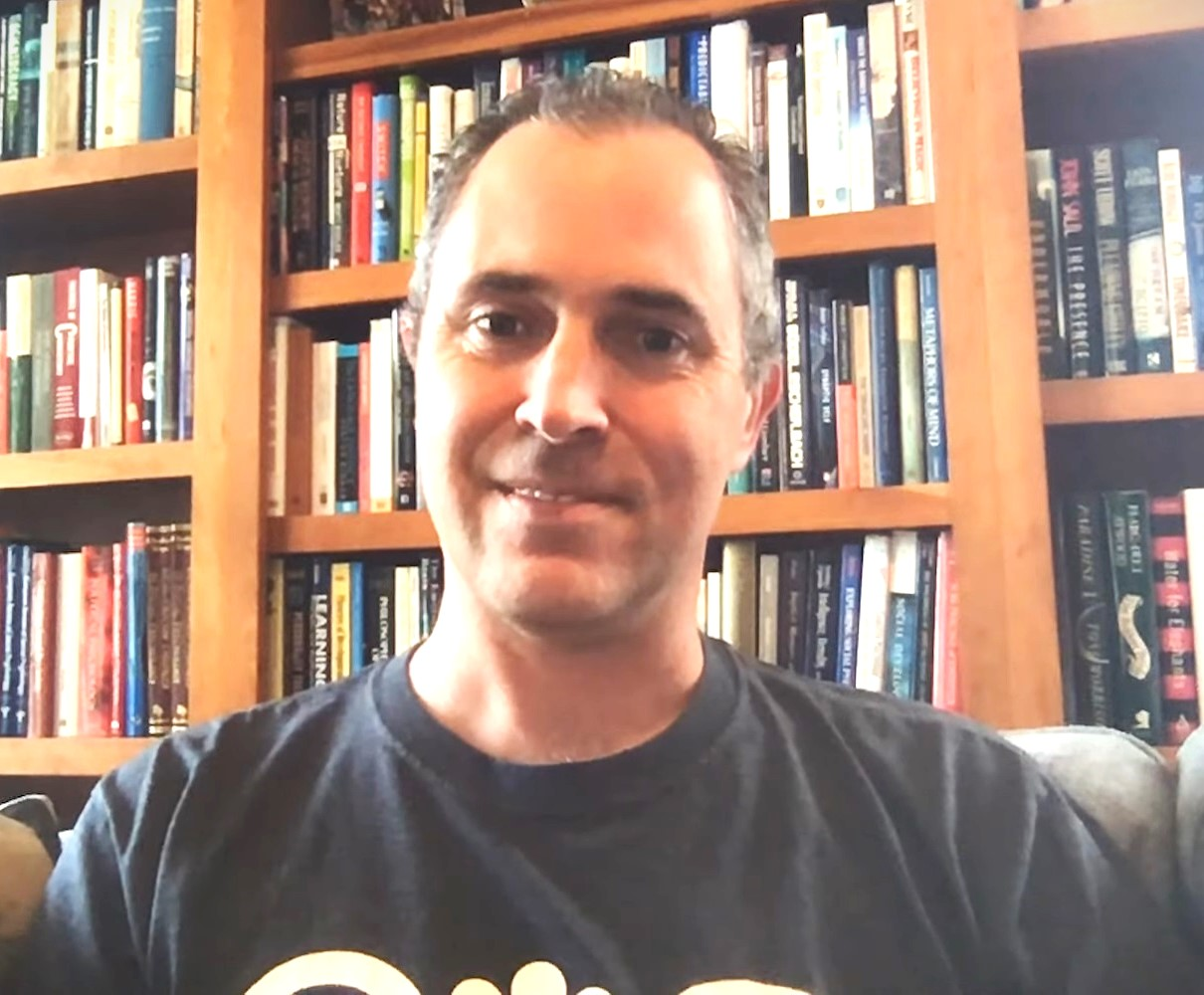
Nosek in 2020

== Honors ==
In 2015, he was named one of "Nature's 10" by the scientific journal Nature. In 2018, Nosek was awarded, alongside Mahzarin Banaji and Anthony Greenwald, with a Golden Goose Award from the American Association for the Advancement of Science for their work on implicit bias.

== See also ==
- Open science
- Metascience
- John Ioannidis
