= James Freedman (disambiguation) =

James Freedman is a British entertainer and stealth crime expert.

James Freedman may also refer to:

- James O. Freedman (1935–2006), president of Dartmouth College and the University of Iowa

== See also ==
- James Friedman (pronounced Freedman), professor of law
- James W. Friedman (1936–2016), American economist
- James Freeman (disambiguation)
