= Cordova, Alabama =

City in Alabama, United States

- City
- City of Cordova
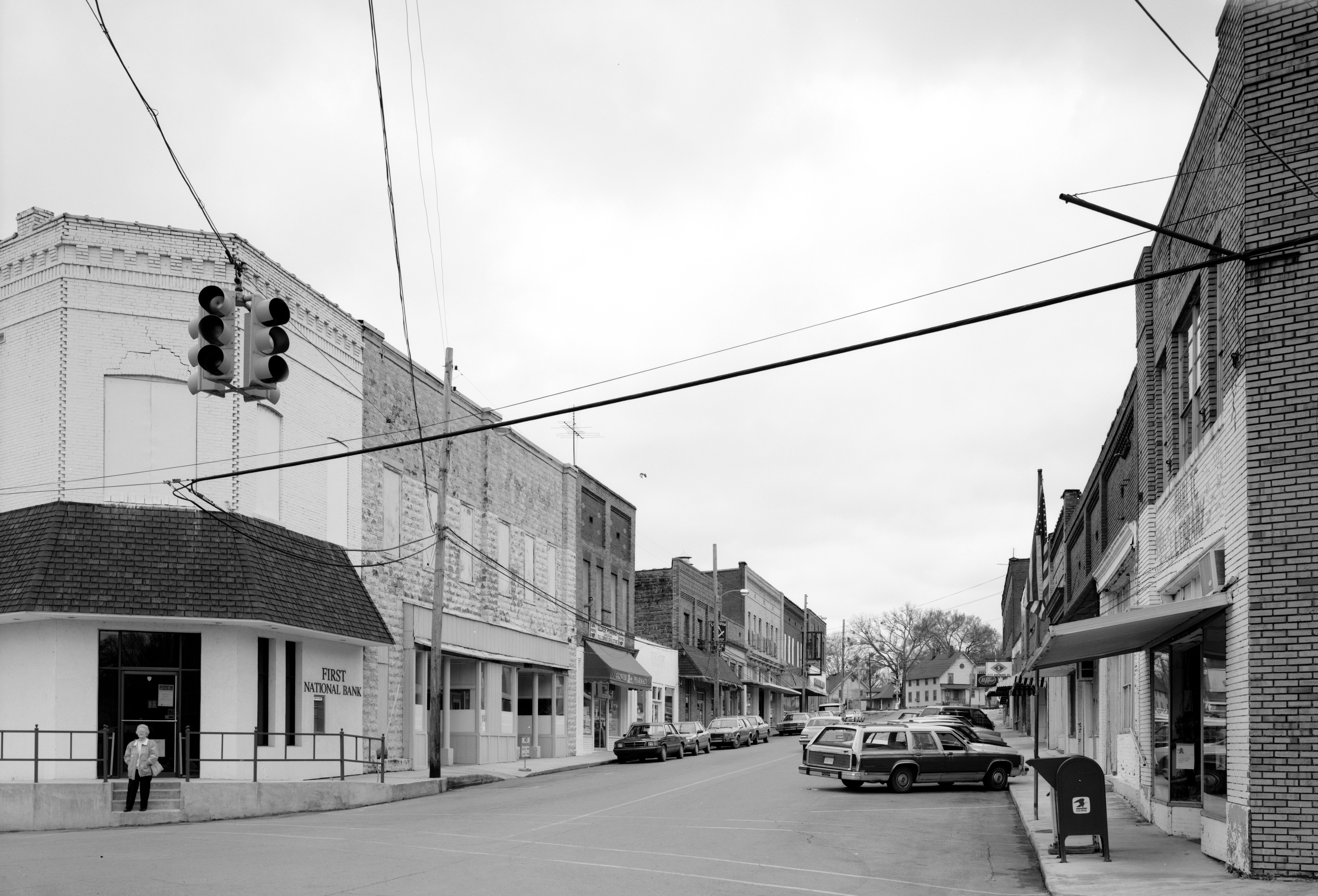
- Main Street in 1993

- Seal

- Location of Cordova in Walker County, Alabama
- Coordinates: 33°45′15″N 87°11′30″W
- Country: United States
- State: Alabama
- County: Walker

Area
  - Total: 5.95 sq mi (15.40 km^{2})
  - Land: 5.83 sq mi (15.10 km^{2})
  - Water: 0.11 sq mi (0.29 km^{2})
- Elevation: 433 ft (132 m)

Population (2020)
  - Total: 1,728
  - Density: 296.3/sq mi (114.41/km^{2})
- Time zone: UTC-6 (Central (CST))
  - Summer (DST): UTC-5 (CDT)
- ZIP code: 35550
- Area codes: 205, 659
- FIPS code: 01-17368
- GNIS feature ID: 2404130
- Website: cordovaal.org

Cordova is a city in Walker County, Alabama, United States. It was formerly a textile mill town. It was incorporated in 1897. As of the 2020 census, Cordova had a population of 1,728.

== History ==
Cordova was originally a settlement on the Mulberry Fork of the Black Warrior River called "Dent" or "Dent's Place." The city was dubbed "Cordova" by Captain Benjamin M. Long in 1859. He named the city after a city in Mexico where he was stationed during the Mexican–American War. Long himself opened a mercantile shop in the city and helped lure other industries into the city by providing the land necessary for their operations.

The company that had the biggest impact on the city was Nashua Manufacturing Company out of Nashua, New Hampshire, who brought in the Indian Head Textile Mills. The mill brought with it many jobs, and as was customary of the day, its own village. The company built over 100 houses in the city, many of which are still standing, and occupied today. The company even built the Indian Head school on the site of present-day "Cordova Health and Rehabilitation Center." The mill helped to bring two major railways to the city, which at the time helped connect the city to much of the surrounding area. The mill eventually became its own "town" and even had its own separate police force.

Indian Head Mills was one of the most highly awarded textile mills during World War II. Their products were found to be above all standards set forth by the government by the War Department. The Mill was referred to by the residents as the Cordova Spinners.

The same way the mill shaped the city around the turn of the 20th century, it also shaped it upon its closing in the middle of the century, after 1962. Over 800 workers lost jobs, the population declined, and industry slowed, while neighboring Jasper took a strong hold on the county seat as the largest city in the county.

=== Present-day Cordova ===
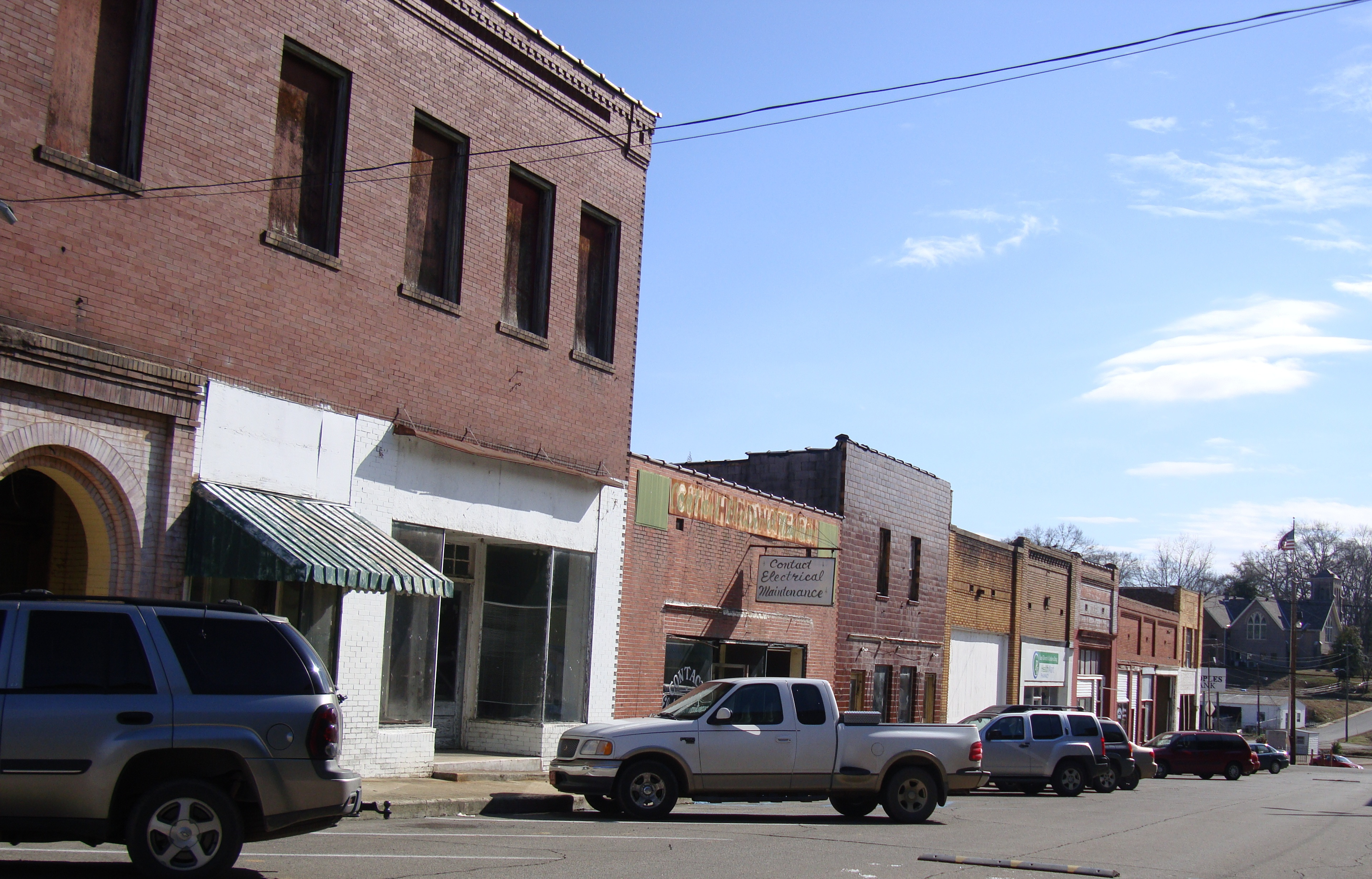
Main Street in 2001, prior to the tornadoes

With access to the Gulf of Mexico via the Warrior and Alabama Rivers, two major railways (Burlington Northern Santa Fe and Norfolk Southern), Interstate 22, and the recent addition of BAE Systems, the city is hoping for economic growth.

Gilchrist House, located near Cordova, is listed on the National Register of Historic Places.

=== 2011 tornadoes ===
On April 27, 2011, an EF3 tornado tore through the city in the early hours of the morning, and the city was hit by an EF4 tornado in the afternoon near 5 pm. The afternoon tornado cut a 1/2-mile (4/5 km) swath through downtown. It destroyed the majority of the historic downtown district, including the city hall, police station, fire station, the old Tallulah Hotel, Piggly Wiggly grocery, People's Bank, and damaged the majority of the central business district beyond repair. The Long Memorial United Methodist Church was also heavily damaged, which had sheltered nearby residents in the basement during the tornado.

The city has completed the following recovery projects since the 2011 tornadoes; $1.5 million Piggly Wiggly grocery store, $3.7 million city hall & police station, $2.4 million sewer treatment plant, $1.5 million utility line replacement, and are currently completing a $250,000 fire-station remodel.

=== 2012 Cordova rock burst ===
On November 19, 2012, Cordova was hit by a minor rock burst that had a body wave magnitude of 2.6. The Mercalli intensity was estimated at II–III (Weak) in Cordova. It was felt throughout Alabama and the Southern United States, up to 500 miles (800 km) from the epicenter. By comparison, a magnitude 3.6 event on the West Coast would not be felt 200 miles (320 km) from the epicenter.

== Geography ==
According to the U.S. Census Bureau, the city has a total area of 5.9 square miles (15 km^{2}), of which 5.9 square miles (15 km^{2}) is land and 0.1 square miles (0.26 km^{2}) (0.84%) is water. Cordova is located in the rolling foothills of the Appalachian Mountains, near the banks of the Mulberry Fork of the Warrior River.

=== Climate ===
The climate in this area is characterized by hot, humid summers and generally mild to cool winters. According to the Köppen Climate Classification system, Cordova has a humid subtropical climate, abbreviated "Cfa" on climate maps.

== Demographics ==
Historical population
Census	Pop.	Note	%±
1900	567		—
1910	1,747		208.1%
1920	1,622		−7.2%
1930	1,830		12.8%
1940	1,881		2.8%
1950	3,156		67.8%
1960	3,184		0.9%
1970	2,750		−13.6%
1980	3,123		13.6%
1990	2,623		−16.0%
2000	2,423		−7.6%
2010	2,095		−13.5%
2020	1,728		−17.5%
U.S. Decennial Census

=== Racial and ethnic composition ===
Cordova city, Alabama – Racial and ethnic composition Note: the US Census treats Hispanic/Latino as an ethnic category. This table excludes Latinos from the racial categories and assigns them to a separate category. Hispanics/Latinos may be of any race.
Race / Ethnicity (NH = Non-Hispanic)	Pop 1980	Pop 1990	Pop 2000	Pop 2010	Pop 2020	% 1980	% 1990	% 2000	% 2010	% 2020
White alone (NH)	2,806	2,301	2,066	1,740	1,431	89.85%	87.72%	85.27%	83.05%	82.81%
Black or African American alone (NH)	304	316	316	304	195	9.73%	12.05%	13.04%	14.51%	11.28%
Native American or Alaska Native alone (NH)	0	2	5	16	4	0.00%	0.08%	0.21%	0.76%	0.23%
Asian alone (NH)	0	0	1	2	0	0.00%	0.00%	0.04%	0.10%	0.00%
Native Hawaiian or Pacific Islander alone (NH)	x	x	1	0	0	x	x	0.04%	0.00%	0.00%
Other race alone (NH)	0	0	0	0	1	0.00%	0.00%	0.00%	0.00%	0.06%
Mixed race or Multiracial (NH)	x	x	12	18	77	x	x	0.50%	0.86%	4.46%
Hispanic or Latino (any race)	13	4	22	15	20	0.42%	0.15%	0.91%	0.72%	1.16%
Total	3,123	2,623	2,423	2,095	1,728	100.00%	100.00%	100.00%	100.00%	100.00%

=== 2020 census ===
As of the 2020 census, Cordova had a population of 1,728 and 506 families. The median age was 45.6 years. 20.4% of residents were under the age of 18 and 23.3% were 65 years of age or older. For every 100 females there were 88.9 males, and for every 100 females age 18 and over there were 84.9 males age 18 and over.

0.0% of residents lived in urban areas, while 100.0% lived in rural areas.

There were 737 households in Cordova, of which 29.0% had children under the age of 18 living in them. Of all households, 30.5% were married-couple households, 22.5% were households with a male householder and no spouse or partner present, and 41.4% were households with a female householder and no spouse or partner present. About 35.9% of all households were made up of individuals and 15.7% had someone living alone who was 65 years of age or older.

There were 855 housing units, of which 13.8% were vacant. The homeowner vacancy rate was 1.6% and the rental vacancy rate was 7.6%.

=== 2010 census ===
At the 2010 census there were 2,095 people in 842 households, including 665 families, in the city. The population density was 355.1 inhabitants per square mile (137.1/km^{2}). There were 1,023 housing units, at an average density of 173.4 per square mile (67.0/km^{2}). The racial makeup of the city was 83.4% White, 14.5% Black or African American, 0.8% Native American, 0.1% Asian, 0% Pacific Islander, 0.3% from other races, and 1.0% from two or more races. 0.7% of the population were Hispanic or Latino of any race. There were 842 households, 26.6% had children under the age of 18 living with them, 37.2% were married couples living together, 21.3% had a female householder with no husband present, and 36.3% were non-families. 33.0% of households were one person and 14.0% were one person aged 65 or older. The average household size was 2.36 and the average family size was 2.95.

The age distribution was 22.1% under the age of 18, 9.1% from 18 to 24, 23.8% from 25 to 44, 25.0% from 45 to 64, and 20.0% 65 or older. The median age was 41.2 years. For every 100 females, there were 85.4 males. For every 100 females age 18 and over, there were 85.5 males.

The median household income was $23,472 and the median family income was $39,185. Males had a median income of $40,868 versus $35,147 for females. The per capita income for the city was $16,016. About 21.3% of families and 29.6% of the population were below the poverty line, including 33.3% of those under age 18 and 20.2% of those age 65 or over.

=== 2000 census ===
At the 2000 census there were 2,423 people in 1,009 households, including 665 families, in the city. The population density was 411.0 inhabitants per square mile (158.7/km^{2}). There were 1,180 housing units at an average density of 200.2 per square mile (77.3/km^{2}). The racial makeup of the city was 85.60% White, 13.25% Black or African American, 0.21% Native American, 0.04% Asian, 0.04% Pacific Islander, 0.29% from other races, and 0.58% from two or more races. 0.91% of the population were Hispanic or Latino of any race. There were 1,009 households, 28.8% had children under the age of 18 living with them, 43.3% were married couples living together, 18.5% had a female householder with no husband present, and 34.0% were non-families. 31.4% of households were one person and 17.0% were one person aged 65 or older. The average household size was 2.29, and the average family size was 2.84.

The age distribution was 23.2% under the age of 18, 7.4% from 18 to 24, 24.4% from 25 to 44, 22.0% from 45 to 64, and 23.1% 65 or older. The median age was 41 years. For every 100 females, there were 79.1 males. For every 100 females age 18 and over, there were 74.2 males.

The median household income was $17,389 and the median family income was $24,896. Males had a median income of $32,353 versus $19,549 for females. The per capita income for the city was $11,489. About 25.6% of families and 26.0% of the population were below the poverty line, including 30.4% of those under age 18 and 14.9% of those age 65 or over.

== Education ==
The city is served by three schools, all members of the Walker County Board of Education. Cordova Elementary School serves grades Kindergarten through fourth. Bankhead Middle School serves students in pre-k and grades five through eight. The school is named for Senator John H. Bankhead, who was also the namesake of the previous high school that was located in the Benchfield community of the city. Cordova High School was built by the Works Progress Administration in 1938, and the building served the city through the 2007 school year. The current facility was an estimated $14 million project that offers the students of Cordova High a state-of-the-art education experience. The school serves students in grades nine through twelve, and is the proud home of a rich athletic tradition. The football program reached State Championships in 1963 (unofficially), 1995, and 2007. The softball team won three State titles in 1994, 1995, and 1997. The boys' basketball team won the Class 4A State championship in 2018, becoming the first team in Walker County ever to do so. In 2019, the cheerleaders won a state title, and in 2020 came in second place at the national competition. The marching band hit a steep decline until 2016, when under the direction of Sara Lipscomb (now under Ryan Perkins). The band has received numerous awards for their playing. The school has received honors in cheer leading, volleyball, golf, band, and most recently track and field/Cross Country where the team qualified for the state championship in 2022 and 2023. The city is within 50 miles (80 km) of the University of Alabama, University of Alabama Birmingham, and within 100 miles (160 km) of the University of North Alabama. The city is within close proximity of several junior colleges.

== Notable people ==
- Doyle Alexander, born in Cordova, major league baseball player
- Jim O'Rear, actor, screenwriter, and director.
- P. W. Underwood, professional football player and coach.
- James S. Voss, astronaut who flew in space five times on board the Space Shuttle and International Space Station.
