= Charles N. Darrah =

Applied anthropologist

Charles A. Darrah (or Chuck) is an emeritus professor of San Jose State University and an applied anthropologist who has done research on manufacturing and the service industry within Silicon Valley. Previously he was the chair of the Anthropology Department at San Jose State and a lecturer who supported students by understanding the value of their skills. He has authored and co-authored several books on the working lives of Americans and skills that can be applied to other types of work.

The body of his academic work is focused on groups that work in the manufacturing and service industry where he studies the organizational structures to understand how they react to the effects caused by the development of contemporary culture either in the organization or outside of it. The anthropological methods used by Chuck throughout his professional career came in an applied form as he used ethnographic methods to analyze organizations then used the data to find solutions.

== Academics ==
Chuck Darrah studied at the University of Alberta where he completed his Bachelor's in Anthropology and completed his Master's in Health Education at San Jose State University. Later in his academic career, he attended Stanford to finish his Doctorate in Anthropology of Education. Before that, he has done previous work as a lecturer at a community college after his graduation as well as conducting field research on manufacturing jobs in Silicon Valley.

== Books ==
He began authoring books in the '90s where the majority of his work focused on the lives of people who worked in industrial settings and establishes research methods to study this phenomenon and its effects on workers.

=== Learning and Work: An Exploration in Industrial Ethnography (1996) ===
This book takes a look at how education and the need to fill skill requirements asked by employers can be a point of contention for educators as they must find ways to adapt lessons to meet the demands of developing job markets. Such demands may come in different forms with examples being the boom for technology-related positions and finding individuals with the skills to use computers while others may look for skills related to labor such as manufacturing. Darrah also examines how workplaces play a role in workers adapting new skills throughout their employment that the employer may not have considered and the unpredictability of doing the actual work once meeting initial skill requirements. He then ties it back to education and talks about how educators can better prepare their students for work by helping them understand the concept of skills and why the following requirements may not always match the demands of the workplace.

=== Busier Than Ever! Why Americans Can't Slow Down (2007) ===
This book explores the working lives of American families by understanding that perceptions of being busy have become ingrained in contemporary culture and how individuals schedule their lives around work than in things such as leisure or play. Busyness has become saturated in American society as the material that Americans surround themselves with is made to remind people to be busy such as alarm clocks, pagers, emails, and other items of convenience that were seen as quality-of-life improvements have instead made Americans more work-oriented, even at home. The book also takes a look into how routines are a product of America's busy lifestyle in that they allow individuals to unconsciously act-out repeated actions and how busyness tends to reinforce the family structure to maintain schedules created by the parents. The book was authored by Charles N. Darrah and co-authored by James M. Freeman and J. A. English Lueck.

=== An Anthropology of Service: Toward a Practice Approach to Designing Services (2015) ===
The book seeks to explain the Anthropology of Service and provides examples from Darrah's and Glomberg's experiences in how they were able to conceptualize the approaches to not only study the service world through an anthropological lens but be also to design services using those insights. Alongside their explanation of their approaches, they also delve into how service has been entwined with human history. It points out the undocumented history of the service industry but is affirmative that the application of anthropological tools will help address issues and find solutions by understanding the human elements that carry out the service. The book was authored by Jeanette Blomberg and Charles N. Darrah.

== Career/projects ==
His anthropological research is focused on the study of organizational structures within manufacturing and has written extensively about the service field. Alongside that he has also started several programs during his time he San Jose State University with prominent ones being Human Aspirations and Design Laboratory and Silicon Valley Cultures Project.

=== Silicon Valley Culture Project ===
This is an ongoing project that was started by Chuck Darrah and Jan English-Lueck in 1991 to study the culture of Silicon Valley. Its purpose was to understand the various communities that live and work in Silicon Valley to track their interaction with the valley's high technology and industrial base. However, their research is not limited to communities in the vicinity of Silicon Valley and is looking to expand the project's breadth of knowledge to external communities that have a stake in what happens there. The project has also provided the students of San Jose State University opportunities to share their own research about Silicon Valley and gain practical experience to use in the field of Social Science.

=== Human Aspirations and Design Laboratory ===
It was a program to familiarize anthropology students with applying ethnographic methods in a workplace setting. For the program, students would learn how to use the research they collect from ethnographies then apply it to design to see if a solution can be found in the process. From there they have to analyze and review their research to find bias within their work and avoid falling back to their original expectations and aspirations for the design that may have not been realistic to human needs. One of the goals of this project was to design a workspace for Herman Miller as they provide the information as they chose to work with Chuck Darrah as part of a contract. This has resulted in design ideas that have been reiterated many times as students began to identify faults in their original plans and made use of ethnographic case studies from Herman Miller workers to understand how they understood the use of space, what activities happened consistently in certain space, how artifacts in workspaces affected productivity and their implications on design concepts. These skills allowed the students to create designs that met the expectations of the project's clients as they revealed other factors such as workspace use and artifacts in those spaces that employers may not have considered before because the students took the perspectives from the ethnographies into account while designing their concepts.
