= Jasper Mall (film) =

2020 American documentary film

- Promotional release poster
- Directed by: Bradford Thomason; Brett Whitcomb
- Produced by: Bradford Thomason; Brett Whitcomb
- Cinematography: Brett Whitcomb
- Edited by: Bradford Thomason
- Distributed by: Amazon Prime Video
- Release dates: 24 January 2020 (Slamdance Film Festival); 23 June 2020 (Amazon Prime)
- Running time: 85 minutes
- Country: United States
- Language: English

Jasper Mall is a 2020 American documentary film directed by Bradford Thomason and Brett Whitcomb. It revolves around the Jasper Mall, a dying mall in Jasper, Alabama.

== Synopsis ==
Jasper Mall often revolves around Mike McClelland, a former zookeeper, who serves as the mall's superintendent and works in a security and caretaking role. The mall, which opened in 1981, has recently lost two of its anchors: Kmart and JCPenney. As a result, foot traffic has declined and the parking lot is often barren. The only remaining anchor store is Belk, and one shopper says "If Belk goes, we are in deep woo-woo."

The film also follows the day-to-day operations of the remaining 20 or so store owners with a focus on the slowdown of customers. The mall's frequent visitors, including groups of mall walkers and domino players, are shown frequently. Also chronicled are events hosted by the mall such as a carnival, visits from Santa Claus and an ensemble of singers. A key subplot in the film follows an interracial relationship between two likable high school students and how it evolved over a period of months.

Toward the end of the film, shops that include Subway, Grady's Sandwich Shop, Robin's Nest Flowers & Gifts, and Jewelry Doctor all close or move.

== Release ==
Jasper Mall premiered at January 27, 2020, at the Slamdance Film Festival and to the general public on June 23, 2020.

== Production ==
Jasper Mall was co-directed and co-produced by Bradford Thomason and Brett Whitcomb. Cinematography was by Whitcomb. The Jasper Mall was chosen as the site of the film because it had not been remodeled since it opened in 1981. The film was shot throughout 2019, and McClelland alerted the directors about any events that were occurring at the mall. Thomason and Whitcomb often sat in the food court and waited for a scene to develop. The soundtrack contains a collection of songs by the musicians HAHA Mart, Chayse Porter, and Baker Knight. The soundtrack was released on vinyl and cassette via the Alabama-based independent record label Earth Libraries.

== Reception ==
On Rotten Tomatoes, the film has an approval rating of 88%, based on eight reviews, with an average rating of 7.5/10.

Ethan Brehm of Spoiler Magazine named it the best film of the year. The film received other positive reviews.

== Awards ==
The film was nominated for the Grand Jury Prize at the Slamdance Film Festival and won the Best Alabama Film award at the Sidewalk Film Festival.
