= Julie Reuben =

- Born: August 2, 1960 (age 66)
- Title: Charles Warren Professor of the History of American Education

Academic background
- Education: Brandeis University, B.A. Stanford University, M.A., Ph.D.
- Alma mater: Stanford University
- Thesis: In Search of Truth: Scientific Inquiry, Religion, and the Development of the American University, 1870-1920 (1990)
- Doctoral advisor: Carl Degler

Academic work
- Discipline: Historian
- Sub-discipline: History of Higher Education
- Notable works: The Making of the Modern University : Intellectual Transformation and the Marginalization of Morality

Julie A. Reuben (born August 2, 1960) is a historian interested in the role of education in American society and culture. Her teaching and research address broad questions about the purposes of education; the relation between educational institutions and political and social concerns; and the forces that shape educational change.

== Biography ==
Reuben is Charles Warren Professor of the History of American Education on the faculty of the Harvard University Graduate School of Education. She received her BA in history from Brandeis University and her MA and PhD in history from Stanford University. She has been selected as a fellow for the Center for Advanced Study in the Behavioral Sciences and received a Major Research Grant from the Spencer Foundation.

She is the author of Making of the Modern University: Intellectual Transformation and the Marginalization of Morality, selected as a Choice Outstanding Academic Book. This book examines the relation between changing conceptions of knowledge, standards of scholarship, and the position of religion and morality in the American university during the late 19th and early 20th centuries. The book draws on examples from eight universities: Harvard, Yale, Columbia, Johns Hopkins, Chicago, Stanford, Michigan, and Berkeley. A review by Landy compares Reuben's work to that of George Marsden, who is more directly concerned with the role of religion and Christianity.

She has written a number of articles related to campus activism, access to higher education, curriculum changes, and citizenship education in the public schools. She is currently working on a book, tentatively entitled Campus Revolts: Politics and the American University in the 1960s, which will be the first serious historical study of campus protests and their impact on American higher education.

== Works ==
- In search of truth : scientific inquiry, religion, and the development of the American University, 1870-1920, 1990.
- The making of the modern university : intellectual transformation and the marginalization of morality , 1996. ISBN 978-0-226-71020-4. (Chinese translation, 2004)

== Awards ==
- Fellowship, Center for Advanced Study in the Behavioral Sciences (2000)
- Choice Outstanding Academic Book Award for Making of the Modern University (1997)
- National Academy of Education/Spencer Postdoctoral Fellowship (1992)
- Dissertation, Whiting Fellowship in the Humanities (1988)
- Spencer Dissertation Fellowship (1987)
