= WQJJ-LP =

Low-power radio station in Jasper, Alabama

- Jasper, Alabama; United States
- Frequency: 101.9 MHz
- Branding: 101.9 Fox-FM

Programming
- Format: Adult Contemporary/Oldies

Ownership
- Owner: North Alabama Public Service Broadcasters

History
- First air date: 2005 (at 97.7)
- Former frequencies: 97.7 MHz (2005–2013); 100.1 MHz (2013–2016)

Technical information
- Licensing authority: FCC
- Facility ID: 135721
- Class: L1
- ERP: 100 watts
- HAAT: 19 meters
- Transmitter coordinates: 33°50′50″N 87°17′7″W

Links
- Public license information: LMS

WQJJ-LP (101.9 FM, "101.9 Fox-FM") is an American low-power FM radio station licensed to serve the community of Jasper, Alabama. WQJJ-LP is owned by North Alabama Public Service Broadcasters.

WQJJ-LP has been active in the Birmingham, Alabama, radio market since it first began broadcasting in January 2005. It remains the sole local radio station within its city of license, Jasper, Alabama, still managed by its original owners.

WQJJ-LP is available on both FM broadcast at 101.9 MHz. as well as online.

== History ==
The station was applied for by its current owners, North Alabama Public Service Broadcasters, during August 2000. A local individual was selected as station manager under its owners. The station was assigned the WQJJ-LP call letters by the Federal Communications Commission on December 30, 2003.

The second-oldest LPFM station in Alabama, WQJJ-LP originally went on the air during January 2005. The local manager managed the station for almost three years and resigned. Because of this, WQJJ-LP temporarily went silent in mid-April 2008. WQJJ-LP was completely rebuilt and returned to the air under management of the original owners on June 18, 2008.

During, and for more than five days following the April 27, 2011 tornado which wiped out several local areas, WQJJ-LP was the only broadcast facility in Walker County to still be on the air and serving the local community. As all other Walker County broadcast stations were inoperative during this time, WQJJ-LP management sought and obtained special temporary authority from the FCC to increase power for the duration of the emergency situation.

On December 25, 2012, the station changed frequencies from its original 97.7 MHz to 100.1 MHz. Due to severe interference received from a new Birmingham FM translator, also authorized to operate on 100.1 MHz., the station relocated again effective February 29, 2016 to 101.9 MHz for a greatly improved and interference free signal.

WQJJ-LP is now known as "101.9 Fox-FM" and airs an Adult Contemporary/Oldies music format, the first in America to be trademarked as "Classic American Top-40".
