= Li Chenyang (pole vaulter) =

Chinese pole vaulter (born 2003)

Personal information
- Born: 12 May 2003 (age 23)

Sport
- Country: China
- Sport: Athletics
- Event: Pole vault

Achievements and titles
- Personal bests: Pole vault: 5.86m (2026) NR
Medal record
Men's athletics
Representing China
Asian Games
Bronze medal – third place	2026 Aichi–Nagoya	Pole vault
Asian Indoor Championships
Silver medal – second place	2026 Tianjin	Pole vault

Li Chenyang (born 12 May 2003) is a Chinese pole vaulter. In 2025, he became the Chinese national record holder in the event. He competed at the 2025 World Athletics Indoor Championships.

== Biography ==
He had breakthrough results competing indoors in France in the winter of 2025. In January 2025, he cleared a personal best 5.64 metres for the pole vault whilst competing in Bordeaux, France. In February 2025, he set a new Chinese national record of 5.85 metres for the pole vault whilst competing in Caen, France. The previous record was held by Li Chenyang's coach Xue Changrui who cleared 5.82 meters at the 2017 World Championships in London, and Yao Jie. He also cleared 5.82 metres in Roubaix, France in February 2025.

In March 2025, he was selected to compete for China at the 2025 World Athletics Indoor Championships in Nanjing, China. At the championships on 22 March 2025, he finished in joint eighth position after clearing 5.50 metres but having failures at 5.70 metres.

He cleared 5.62 metres to place eighth at the 2025 Shanghai Diamond League event in China on 3 May 2025. He competed at the 2025 World Athletics Championships in Tokyo, Japan, in September 2025, without advancing to the final.

In February 2026, he won the silver medal in the pole vault at the 2026 Asian Indoor Athletics Championships in Tianjin, China. The following month, he increased the Chinese national record to 5.86 metres. Competing at the 2026 Asian Games in Aichi-Nagoya, Japan in September 2026, he cleared 5.70m to win the bronze medal on countback behind compatriot Yao Jie.

== Personal life ==
He attended the School of Physical Education of Nanchang University.
