= Jasper Mall =

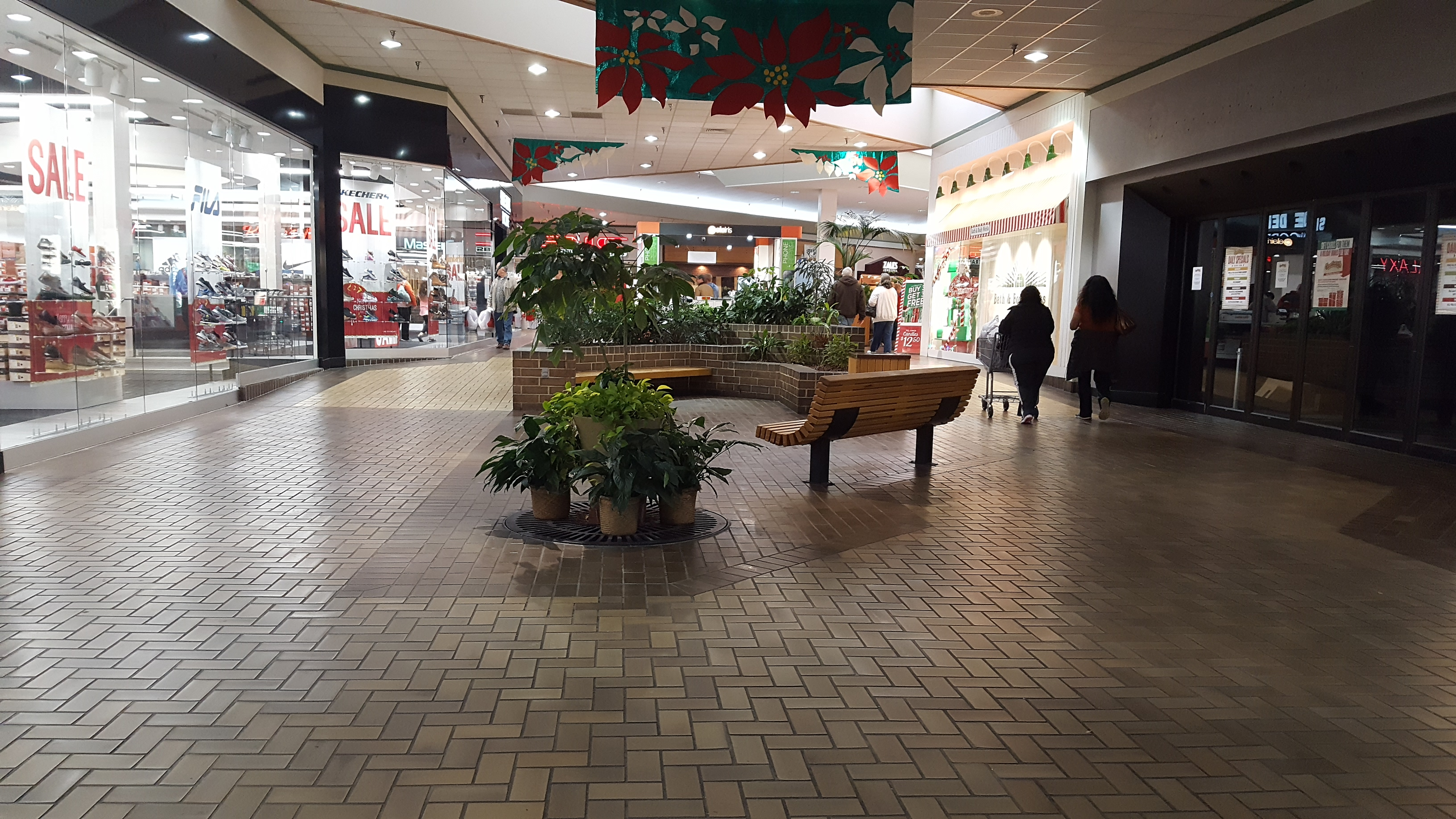
- Interior view of Jasper Mall, December 2016
- Location: Jasper, Alabama, United States
- Coordinates: 33°51′06.1″N 87°16′18.7″W
- Opened: August 8, 1981
- Developer: George Ewing
- Owner: Kohan Retail Investment Group
- Num. of stores: 31
- Num. of anchor tenants: 3
- Floor area: 350,000 square feet (33,000 m^{2})
- Floors: 1
- Website: shopjaspermall.com

Jasper Mall is an enclosed shopping mall located in Jasper, Alabama, United States, approximately 30 miles (48 km) northwest of Birmingham.

== History ==
The mall opened on August 8, 1981. It currently is approximately 350,000 square feet (33,000 m^{2}) in size, and includes three anchors and about 21 smaller inline stores.

Originally developed by the local Simmons family and Georgia developer George Ewing, the mall is owned by Kohan Retail. Anchor JCPenney moved from downtown to the mall when it opened. The local paper has reported that it is unusual for a mall to have Kmart as an anchor.

Sharp Development Group, led by Sam Sharp, purchased the mall from Jasper Mall Associates in 1996.

Third anchor Belk opened an approximately 60,000-square-foot (5,600 m^{2}) store in March 2002. This was part of an 80,000-square-foot (7,400 m^{2}) expansion of the mall by Sharp Realty.

On December 28, 2016, Sears Holdings announced that Kmart would be closing as part of a plan to close 30 Sears and Kmart stores nationwide. The store closed in March 2017.This space is now occupied by Rural King.

On March 17, 2017, it was announced that the JCPenney store would also be closing as part of a plan to close 138 locations. The store closed its doors permanently on July 31.This space is now occupied by Dunham's Sports.

On January 24, 2020, Jasper Mall, a documentary feature film billed as "a year in the life of a dying shopping mall, its patrons, and its tenants", premiered at Slamdance Film Festival.

On November 12, 2021, Dunham's Sports opened in the former JCPenney anchor location on the east end of the Jasper Mall, acquiring the entire JCPenney space.

On January 17, 2023, the Jasper City Council approved an incentive package, which has allowed a Rural King store to open in the former Kmart space on the west end of the Jasper Mall. Rural King officially opened for business Friday, April 4, 2025.

== See also ==
- Jasper Mall (film)
