= USS Alchiba =

Cargo ship of the United States Navy

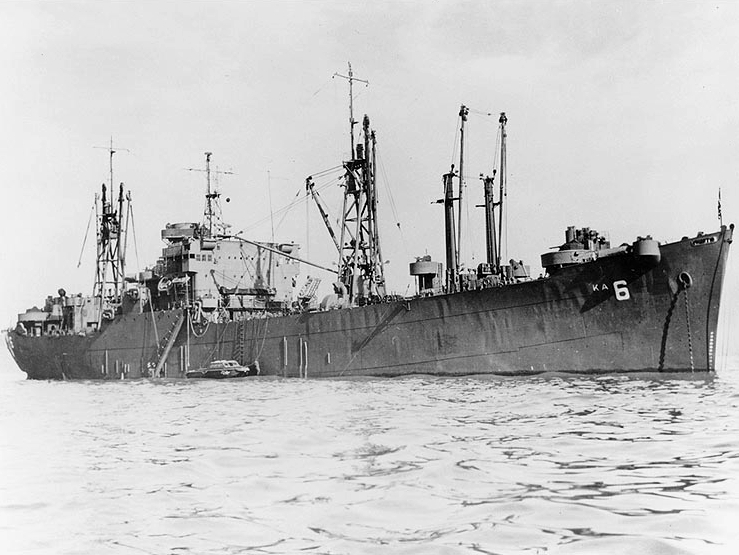
- USS Alchiba (AKA-6)

History

United States
- Name: USS Alchiba
- Namesake: Alchiba, a star in the constellation Corvus
- Builder: Sun Shipbuilding & Drydock Co., Chester, Pennsylvania
- Laid down: 15 August 1938, as SS Mormacdove
- Launched: 6 July 1939
- Acquired: 2 June 1941
- Commissioned: 15 June 1941
- Decommissioned: 14 January 1946
- Renamed: USS Alchiba (AK-23), 3 June 1941
- Reclassified: AKA-6 (attack cargo ship), 1 February 1943
- Stricken: 25 February 1946
- Identification: IMO number: 5362544
- Honours and awards: 3 battle stars & Presidential Unit Citation (World War II)
- Fate: Sold into merchant service, 1948; Scrapped, 1973

General characteristics
- Class & type: Arcturus-class attack cargo ship
- Type: Type C2 ship
- Displacement: 6,761 long tons (6,869 t) light
- Length: 459 ft 2 in (139.95 m)
- Beam: 63 ft (19 m)
- Draft: 26 ft 4 in (8.03 m)
- Speed: 16.5 knots (30.6 km/h; 19.0 mph)
- Complement: 247
- Armament: 1 × 5 in (130 mm) gun mount; 4 × twin 40 mm gun mounts; 16 × 20 mm gun mounts

USS Alchiba (AKA-6) was an Arcturus-class attack cargo ship of the United States Navy, named after Alchiba, a star in the constellation Corvus. She served as a commissioned ship for 4 years and 7 months.

== Operational history ==
Laid down as Mormacdove under a Maritime Commission contract (MC hull 21) on 15 August 1938 at Chester, Pennsylvania, by the Sun Shipbuilding & Drydock Co., Hull 178; launched on 6 July 1939; sponsored by Miss Alice W. Clement; delivered 21 September 1939 to owner/operator Moore-McCormack Lines, Inc.; acquired by the Navy on 2 June 1941; renamed Alchiba the next day and simultaneously designated AK-23; converted by the Boston Navy Yard for naval service as a cargo ship; and placed in commission at Boston on 15 June 1941.

=== 1941 ===
Alchiba was assigned to the Naval Transportation Service and sailed to Charleston, South Carolina, for shakedown training. She then carried out training exercises along the East Coast through early October and sailed – via Quonset Point, Rhode Island – for Halifax, Nova Scotia, to take on cargo and personnel for transportation to Iceland. She departed Halifax on 22 October in convoy HX 156 and reached Reykjavík, Iceland, on 30 November. The vessel discharged cargo there before sailing back to the United States. She reached New York City on 26 December, and was briefly drydocked there for repairs.

=== 1942 ===
The ship got underway on 11 January 1942, arrived at Charleston – via Norfolk, Virginia – on the 19th, took on supplies and equipment destined for the Pacific theater, and set sail on 27 January. She transited the Panama Canal on 2 February; joined the Base Force, Pacific Fleet; and continued on to the Society Islands. Alchiba reached Bora Bora on the 17th and began discharging her cargo. She departed that port on 14 March and shaped a course for Chile. She reached Antofagasta, Chile, on 29 March and took on a load of ingot and electrolytic copper. After transiting the Panama Canal on 8 April, the cargo ship arrived back in New York City on 19 April and unloaded her cargo.

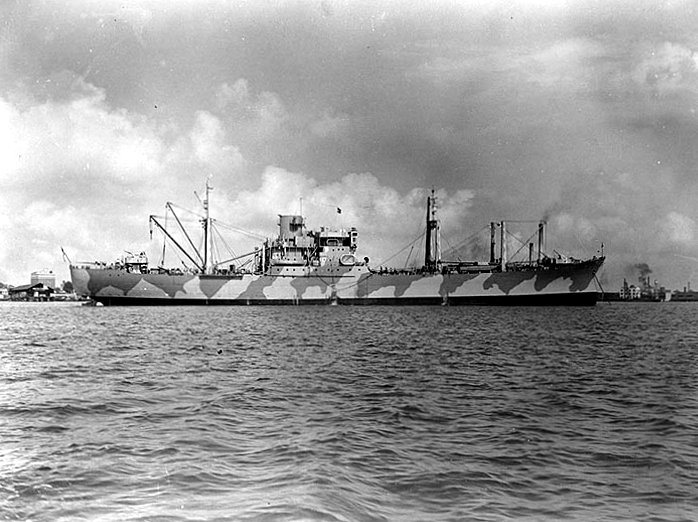
Alchiba circa in early 1942.

One week later, Alchiba moved to Charleston and underwent a period of repairs and alterations. She resumed duty late in May and sailed for Hampton Roads to take on cargo and personnel destined for service in the South Pacific. The ship then got underway on 10 June, transited the Panama Canal on the 17th, and reached Wellington, New Zealand, on 11 July.

The vessel was assigned to Amphibious Force, Pacific Fleet, and became a member of Transport Division C. For Operation Watchtower, Alchiba's Division served under Task Force 62 (South Pacific Amphibious Force), Task Group 62.1, Transport Group X-Ray. On 22 July, she sailed for Korp Island, Fiji Islands, to participate in amphibious landing exercises – the rehearsal for the first American assault landing in the Pacific theater. Upon completing this training, she embarked marines and filled her holds with ammunition, amphibious tractors, gasoline, and general supplies and got underway for operations in the Solomon Islands. The vessel arrived off Guadalcanal on 7 August, where she disembarked her troops, unloaded her cargo, and helped rescue survivors from the USS Astoria, sunk after the Battle of Savo Island. She left the Solomons on 9 August, bound for New Caledonia. After her arrival at Nouméa on the 13th, the ship loaded on more cargo and, nine days later, commenced a voyage which took her to Pago Pago, American Samoa; Tongatapu, Tonga Islands; and Espiritu Santo, New Hebrides.

Alchiba returned to Guadalcanal on 18 September. After unloading cargo to support Marines struggling for that island, she sailed back to New Caledonia (7–10 October) for more supplies and returned to Guadalcanal on 1 November. During November the ship shuttled supplies and personnel between Guadalcanal and Tulagi. She was anchored off Lunga Point at 0616 on 28 November, when two torpedoes from Japanese Ko-hyoteki class midget submarine Ha-10 (launched from submarine I-16) exploded on the vessel's port side. At that time, her No. 2 hold was loaded with drums of aviation gasoline and ammunition, and the resulting explosion shot flames 150 feet in the air. The commanding officer, James Shepherd Freeman, ordered the ship to weigh anchor and run upon the beach. This action undoubtedly saved the ship. Hungry flames raged in the ship for over five days before weary fire fighting parties finally brought them under control. Captain Freeman was awarded the Navy Cross and executive officer Commander Howard R. Shaw the Silver Star for their leadership in saving this vessel.

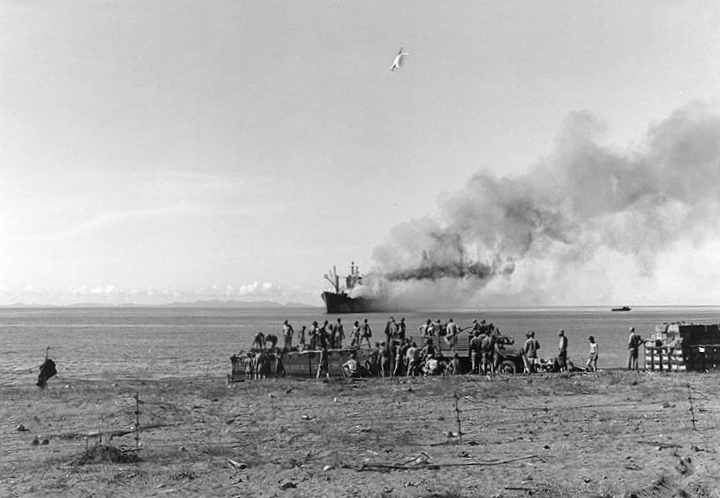
Alchiba aground and afire off Lunga Point in November 1942.

Salvage operations began soon thereafter. Most of her cargo was saved, and temporary repairs were in progress when Alchiba was torpedoed again on 7 December, this time by midget submarine Ha-38 (launched from I-24). An enemy submarine's conning tower had been spotted shortly before two torpedoes were fired. One passed close under the cargo ship's stern, but the other struck her No. 4 hold on the port side near the engine room. Although the hold cargo (500-pound bombs) had been unloaded earlier, the blast killed three men, including Everett M. Stuermer, MM2 wounded six others, and caused considerable structural damage. Once the fires and flooding were controlled, salvage operations resumed and enabled the ship to get underway for Tulagi on 27 December 1942.

=== 1943 ===
Alchiba remained at Tulagi through 18 January 1943. On that day, she was moved to Espiritu Santo for further repair work. While at that island, the ship was redesignated AKA-6 on 1 February. She left Espiritu Santo on 6 May, bound for the West Coast of the United States, and entered the Mare Island Naval Shipyard, Vallejo, California, on 2 June.

Her refurbishing there lasted until early August when she conducted sea trials off the California coast before sailing on 13 August for Port Hueneme, California, to take on cargo. Six days later, she headed for the South Pacific to continue her service providing logistics support for Allied fighting men. Alchiba left Espiritu Santo on 12 September. She made runs to New Caledonia and Guadalcanal and in mid-November, participated in the landings on Bougainville, as part of Transport Division C, III Amphibious Force. Alchiba returned to Espiritu Santo on 13 December.

=== 1944 ===
Alchiba continued her supply duties in the Solomon Islands and New Caledonia through late March 1944. In April, Alchiba was assigned to carry elements of the 25th RCT (Regimental Combat Team), 4th Marines, for the invasion of Saipan as part of Transport Division 20. However, during the rehearsal in mid-May she had to return to Pearl Harbor for major repairs, and her place was taken by AKA 19 (USS Thuban). On 25 May, the ship left Pearl Harbor for the West Coast of the United States.

On 30 May, Alchiba entered the Moore Dry Dock Company, Oakland, California, to undergo extensive alterations and repairs. The work was completed late in August, and the cargo ship got underway for sea trials in San Francisco Bay. Engine trouble developed during these tests, and the ship returned to the yard on 1 September for further repairs. She took on cargo at the Hunters Point Navy Yard on the 22d and sailed once again for Espiritu Santo.

While en route, the ship experienced more engine problems, but she reached her destination on 9 October and commenced repair work. This process continued until early November, when the vessel shaped a course back to San Francisco. She arrived at the Mare Island Naval Shipyard, Vallejo, California, on the 29th and underwent extensive repairs to her main engine.

=== 1945 ===
On 24 February 1945, Alchiba commenced sea trials but was forced to return to Mare Island two days later for still more work. Two weeks later, the ship sailed to Morehaven(?), California, to load cargo and got underway on 20 March for Pearl Harbor. During the run to Hawaii, the engines continued to give trouble, and Alchiba returned to San Francisco for further repairs, this time by the General Engineering & Drydock Corp.

The cargo ship left the shipyard on 3 June; sailed to the Naval Supply Depot, Oakland, California; took on cargo there; and put to sea on the 15th, bound for Ulithi. While she was en route there, her destination was changed to Pearl Harbor because of still more engine trouble. Upon her arrival at Hawaii on the 24th, repair work was resumed. The ship sailed again on 8 July for Eniwetok, Marshall Islands; Ulithi, Caroline Islands; Guam, Mariana Islands; and Manila, Philippines. The end of World War II in mid-August found Alchiba in port at Ulithi unloading cargo. She remained on duty in the western Pacific through 26 October, when she was ordered back to the United States.

Alchiba arrived at San Francisco on 19 November. Eight days later, she began a voyage to the East Coast, transited the Panama Canal on 10 December, and sailed for Norfolk where she arrived on the 18th. Preparations for her deactivation then began.

=== Decommissioning and sale ===
The ship was decommissioned at Portsmouth, Virginia, on 14 January 1946; and her name was struck from the Navy List on 25 February 1946. She was transferred on 19 July 1946 to the Maritime Commission for disposal. She was sold in 1948 and refitted for merchant service in the Netherlands as Tjipanas, later renamed Tong Jit, and scrapped in 1973.

== Awards ==
- Combat Action Ribbon (two awards)
- Presidential Unit Citation
- American Defense Service Medal with "A" device
- American Campaign Medal
- Asiatic-Pacific Campaign Medal with three battle stars for World War II service
- World War II Victory Medal

Alchiba earned three battle stars for her World War II service, and received two awards of the Combat Action Ribbon, for actions on 8 November 1942 and 7 December 1942.

Alchiba was awarded a Presidential Unit Citation for her service at Guadalcanal from August through December 1942. She is the only cargo ship in the history of the U.S. Navy to receive the Presidential Unit Citation. As a citation awardee, she was entitled to fly the Presidential Unit Citation pennant beneath her ensign, and to be saluted by other warships whenever entering a military port.
