= Jim Freeman (Australian footballer) =

Australian rules footballer

Personal information
- Full name: James Henry Freeman
- Born: 21 November 1889; Richmond, Victoria
- Died: 4 February 1956 (aged 66); Queensland
- Original team: North Melbourne (VFA)

Playing career^{1}
Years	Club	Games (Goals)
1913	North Melbourne (VFA)	7 (1)
1914	Essendon	2 (0)
- ^{1} Playing statistics correct to the end of 1914.

James Henry Freeman (21 November 1889 – 4 February 1956) was an Australian rules footballer who played with Essendon in the Victorian Football League (VFL).
