= Jasper Downtown Historic District =

Historic district in Alabama, United States

- U.S. National Register of Historic Places
- U.S. Historic district
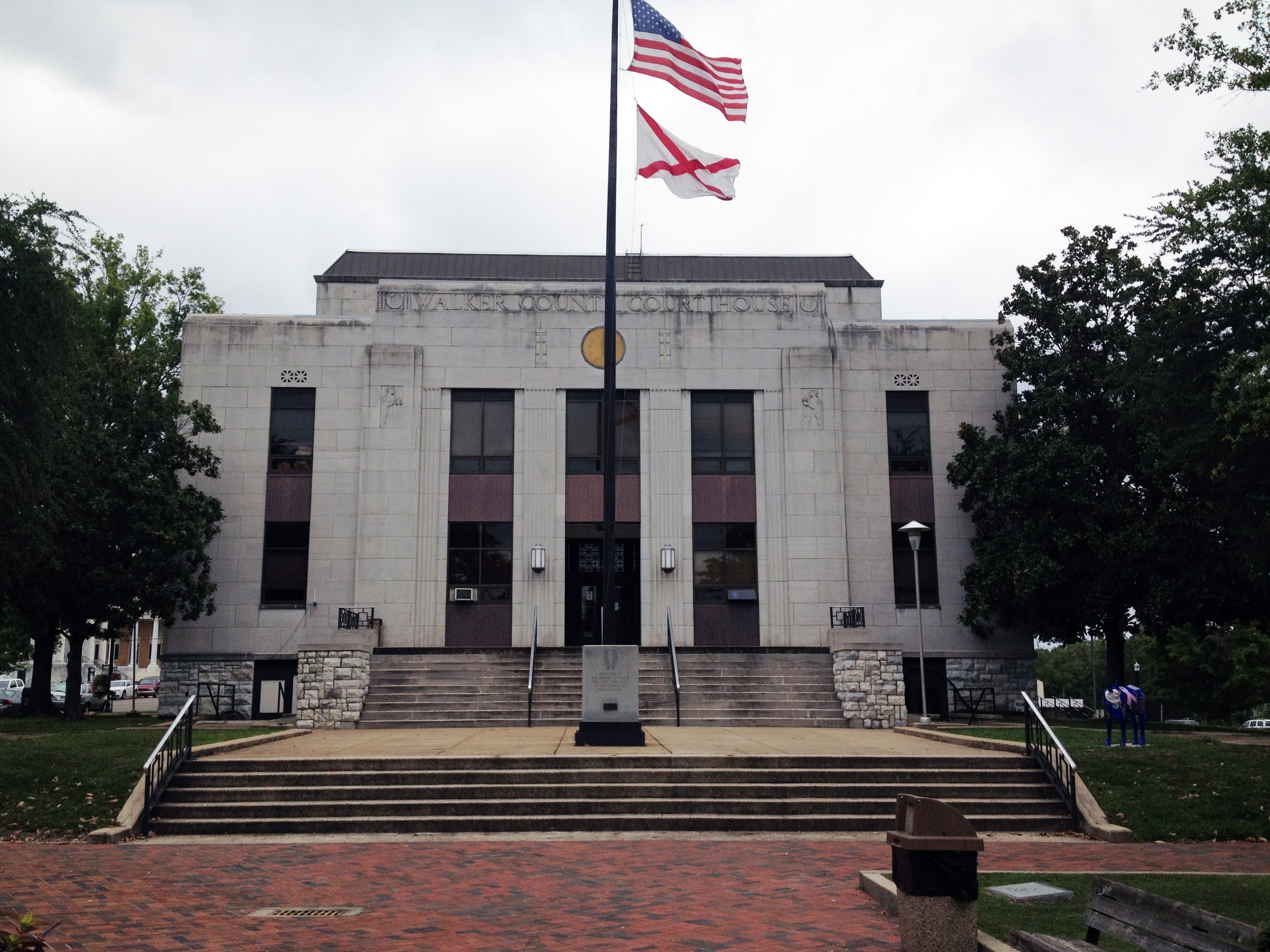

- Location within Alabama Location within the United States
- Location: Roughly bounded by 17th St., Corona Ave., 20th St., and 8th Ave., Jasper, Alabama
- Area: 400 acres (160 ha)
- Architect: Office of the Supervising Architect under James A. Wetmore (post office); Smith & Cater (jail)
- Architectural style: Queen Anne, Classical Revival, Beaux-Arts and Art Deco
- NRHP reference No.: 04000233
- Added to NRHP: March 31, 2004

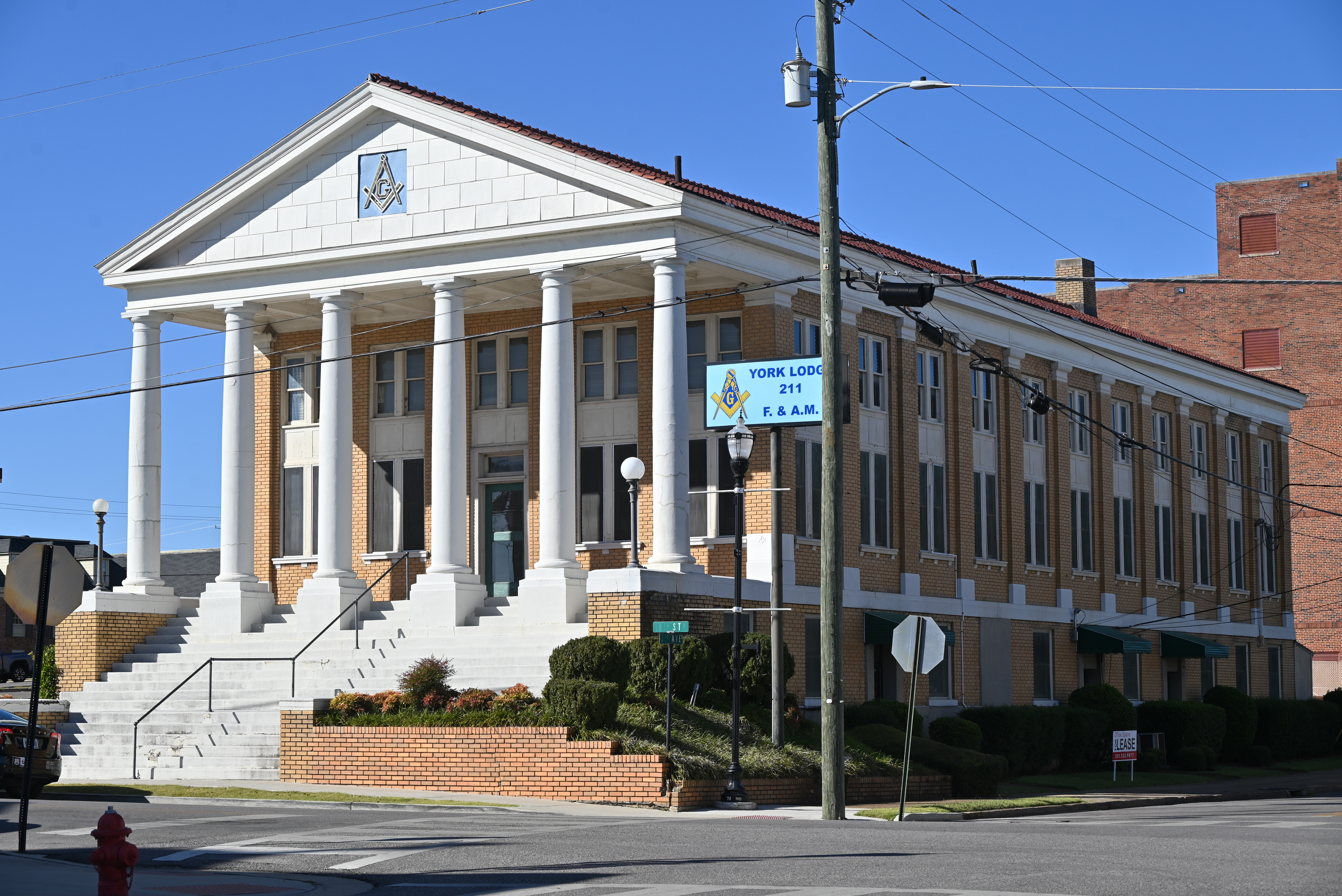
Masonic Lodge

The Jasper Downtown Historic District comprises 400 acres (160 ha) of Jasper, Alabama, centered on the county courthouse. Most of the buildings in the district are commercial, with other uses including the Masonic Temple, the post office and city hall, several houses and a number of warehouses. Most of the buildings were built in the 1920s through the 1940s. A variety of architectural styles are preserved, including Beaux-Arts and Art Deco.

The district was added to the National Register of Historic Places on March 31, 2004.
