= James Midwinter Freeman =

American writer and clergyman

James Midwinter Freeman (1827–1900) was an American clergyman and writer. He was born in New York City and was educated at Wesleyan University and at Mount Union College (Ohio). He entered the Methodist ministry and in 1872 became assistant editor of various Sunday-school and tract publications of the Methodist Episcopal church. Under the pseudonym of "Robin Ranger," Freeman wrote several books for children. His other works include:

- Use of Illustration in Sunday School Teaching (1867)
- Handbook of Bible Manners and Customs (1874)
- A Story History of the English Bible (1879)
