= Li Chenyang =

Singaporean professor

Li Chenyang is a professor of Philosophy at Nanyang Technological University in Singapore. He is internationally recognized for his work in Chinese philosophy and comparative philosophy, best known for his work in the Confucian philosophy of harmony, and comparative studies of Confucian ethics and feminist care ethics.

== Biography ==
Li received a BA and MA in philosophy from Peking University, and a Ph.D. in philosophy from the University of Connecticut in 1992, where he had been supervised by Joel J. Kupperman. He has garnered more than 20 years of extensive teaching, research, and administrative experience. Prior to joining Nanyang Technological University in 2010, Li worked at Central Washington University, where he was a Professor and Chair of the Philosophy Department and received a number of awards, including Distinguished University Research Professor Award, Distinguished Department Chair Award, and Key to Success Award (Student Service).

Li was also elected as chair of the university's Academic Department Chairs Organization. At Nanyang Technological University, he has served as the founding coordinator (2010 - 2014) and then head (2014 - 2018) of the Philosophy program, successfully building it from the ground up to a now fully-fledged program.

Li was a Senior Visiting Fellow at the City University of Hong Kong (CityU) (2005 - 2006), ACE Fellow of the American Council on Education (2008 - 2009), and Berggruen Fellow at the Center for Advanced Study in the Behavioral Sciences, Stanford University (2015 - 2016).

== Academic contributions ==
Li has published 21 books (7 single-authored) and over 100 sole-authored journal articles and book chapters. His most recent publication is Reshaping Confucianism: A Progressive Inquiry. New York: Oxford University Press, 2023.

Li was the founding president of the Association of Chinese Philosophers in North America (1995 - 1997), president of the International Society for Chinese Philosophy (2015 - 2017), and a member of the Asia Committee of the American Philosophical Association (1999 - 2000). He was president of the International Society for Chinese Philosophy for a two-year term (2016 - 2017) and is a member of the Academic Advisory Board of Berggruen Philosophy and Culture Center. He is on the editorial/academic boards of over two dozen scholarly publications and organizations in fields related to his areas of expertise. Notre Dame Philosophical Reviews has called him "one of the world's leading interpreters of Confucian philosophy". China Review says that "Li is perhaps the most influential Confucian-inspired philosopher in the Anglophone world". The Stanford-Elsevier TOP2%SCIENTISTS list identified him as one of the world's top 2% most impactful philosophers.
