= First United Methodist Church (Jasper, Alabama) =

Historic church in Alabama, United States

- U.S. National Register of Historic Places
- Alabama Register of Landmarks and Heritage
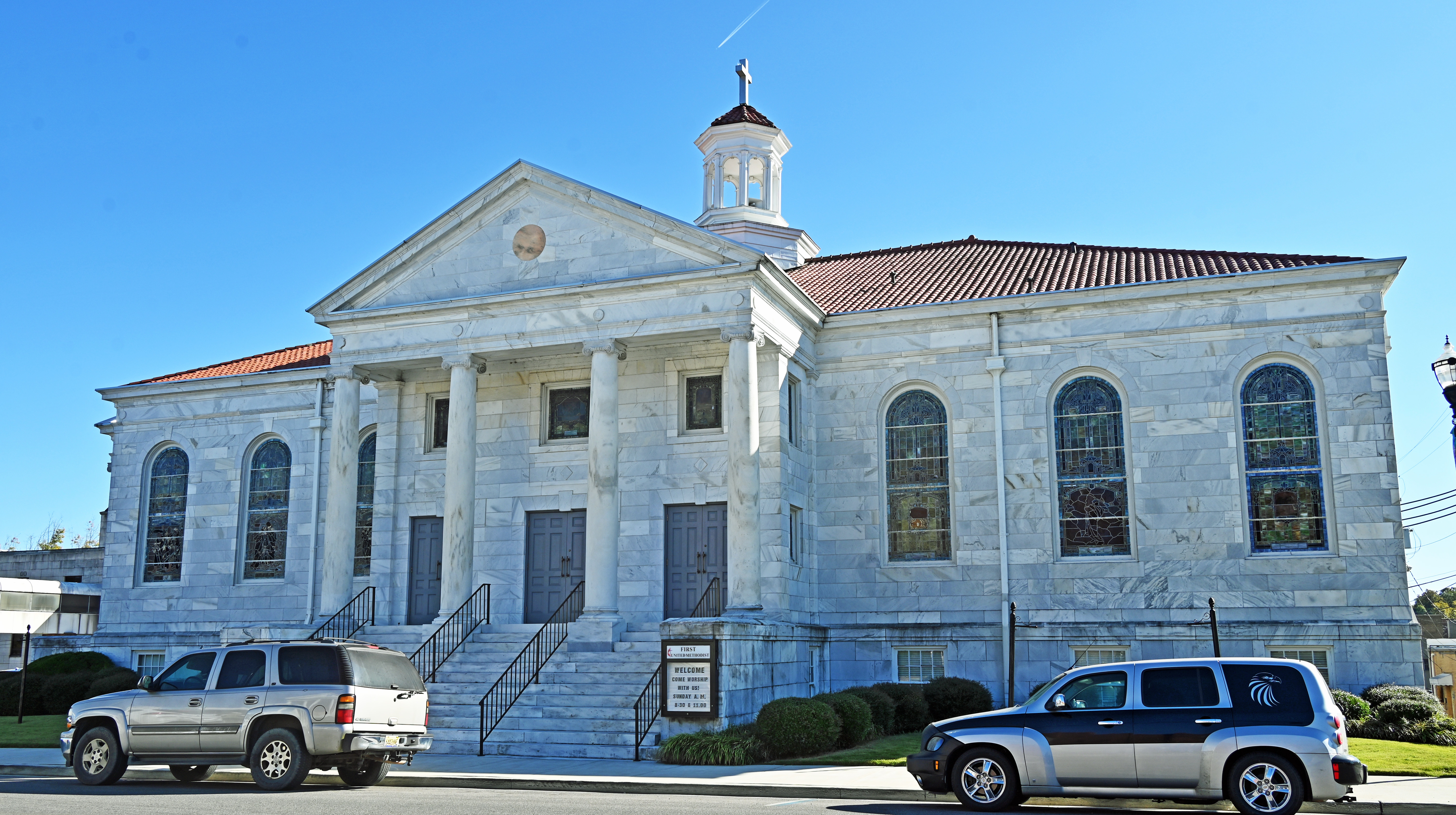
- Front view in 2022

- Location within Alabama Location within the United States
- Location: 1800 3rd Ave., Jasper, Alabama
- Coordinates: 33°50′1″N 87°16′40″W
- Area: 0.4 acres (0.16 ha)
- Built: 1921
- Architectural style: Beaux Arts
- NRHP reference No.: 85000257

Significant dates
- Added to NRHP: February 14, 1985
- Designated ARLH: January 31, 1983

The First United Methodist Church is a historic United Methodist Church in Jasper, Alabama. The congregation dates back to the 1830s. This building is their fifth, built from 1912–21. Architectural scholars consider this to be one of the best of its type in the state. It was added to the National Register of Historic Places on February 14, 1985. On December 10, 2022, the congregation disaffiliated with the United Methodist Church to join the Global Methodist Church and began using the name Jasper First Methodist Church.

== History ==
The First United Methodist Church is the oldest religious congregation in Jasper. It was formed on June 14, 1833 when the first log church, formerly a community school, was deeded to the congregation. This building was used until they built a new frame structure at the current site circa 1858–59. The congregation went through two additional buildings before building the current church.

The congregation established a building fund for a new structure in 1912. Construction started sometime afterwards. Lycurgus Breckenridge Musgrove was a major source of funding. A local banker and businessman, he donated two dollars for every one dollar raised by other means. He also donated the marble used in construction and the pipe organ. The construction was interrupted by World War I, but resumed afterward. The new building was dedicated on November 3, 1921.

A tornado struck the building on April 3, 1974, causing extensive damage to the cupola and roof. It also ripped the main sanctuary doors apart, damaged or destroyed 34 of the 38 stained glass windows, and caused water damage in the interior. The damage was repaired from 1975–76. Destroyed stained glass windows were restored with sympathetically-designed modern replacements.

== Architecture ==
Architectural historians with the Alabama Historical Commission consider the building to be "among Alabama's most outstanding examples of Beaux-Arts neoclassicism as interpreted for an ecclesiastical structure." Oddly, for a 20th-century building, the architect is unknown. Some scholars have suggested William Leslie Welton, a leading Birmingham architect of the period. It is also possible that it was adapted from designs in the Methodist publication Catalog of Plans of Down to Date Twentieth Century Churches, published in 1912. It closely resembles plans 58 and 59 by George Kramer, an architect in New York City. Another possibility is that the design was largely by the church pastor at that time, the Reverend William Winfield Scott.

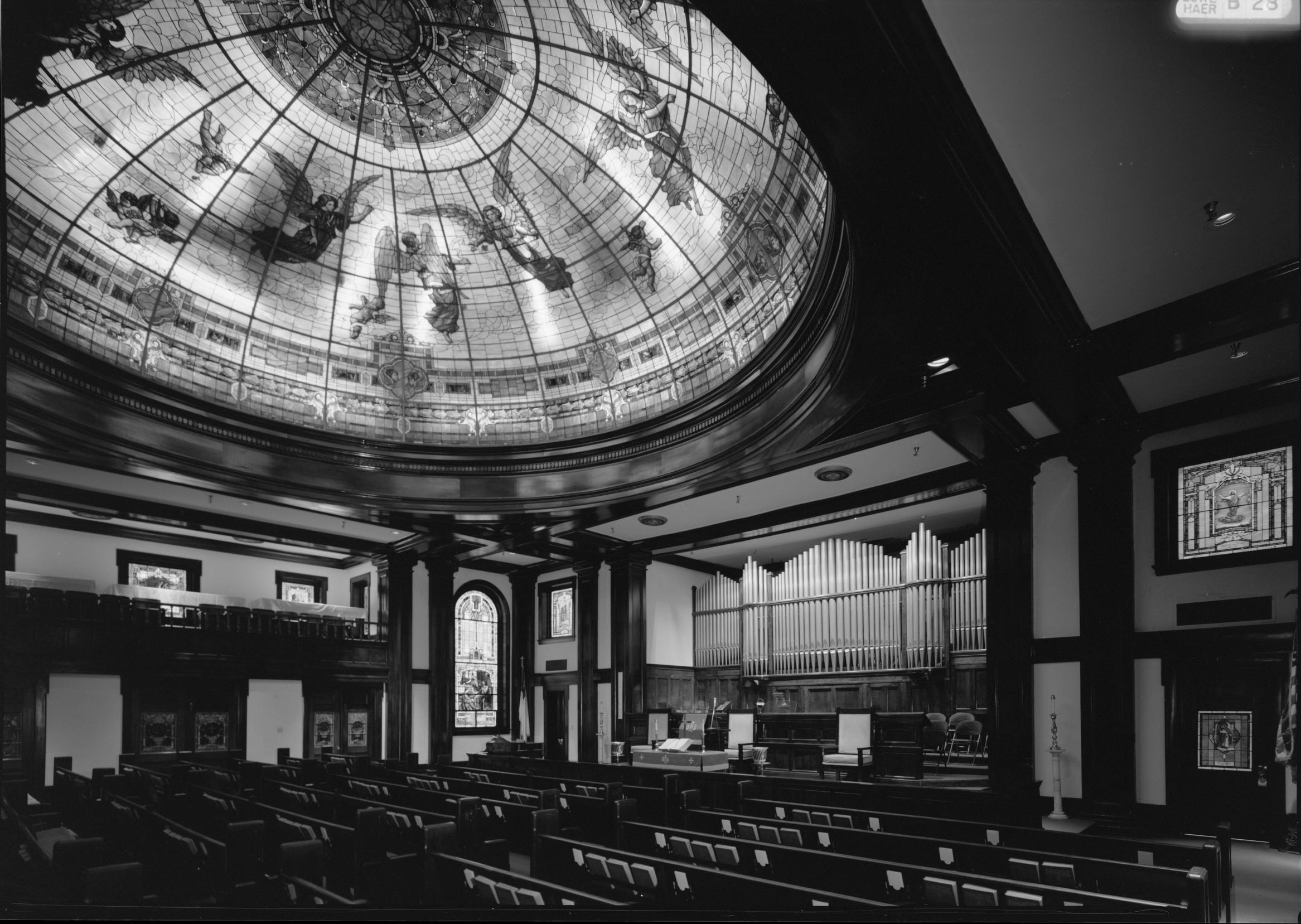
The interior, view of the sanctuary with its stained glass dome.

The building is masonry, faced with Georgia marble. The two-story building is rectangular, set atop a raised basement. With the building situated on a corner lot, the principal facades are on the north and east sides. The projecting porticoes on the principal facades are hexastyle with monolithic columns. The Ionic column capitals are a type used by Vincenzo Scamozzi. An off-center pavilion on the south side of the building contains the choir. The porticoes on the two principal facades are flanked by large arched stained glass windows. A shallow hipped roof of terracotta tiles covers the building, surmounted by an octagonal cupola.

The primary space in the interior of the church is the sanctuary. It is a large square auditorium. Panelled pilasters and other elaborate woodwork in Honduran mahogany encircles the two-story room. A circular 34-foot (10 m) diameter art glass dome, 9 feet (2.7 m) high, provides illumination in the room. It is made up of 109 sections and contains 30,000 individual pieces of glass. It is lighted from above by electric light bulbs.
