= James Shepherd Freeman =

James Shepherd Freeman, Sr.
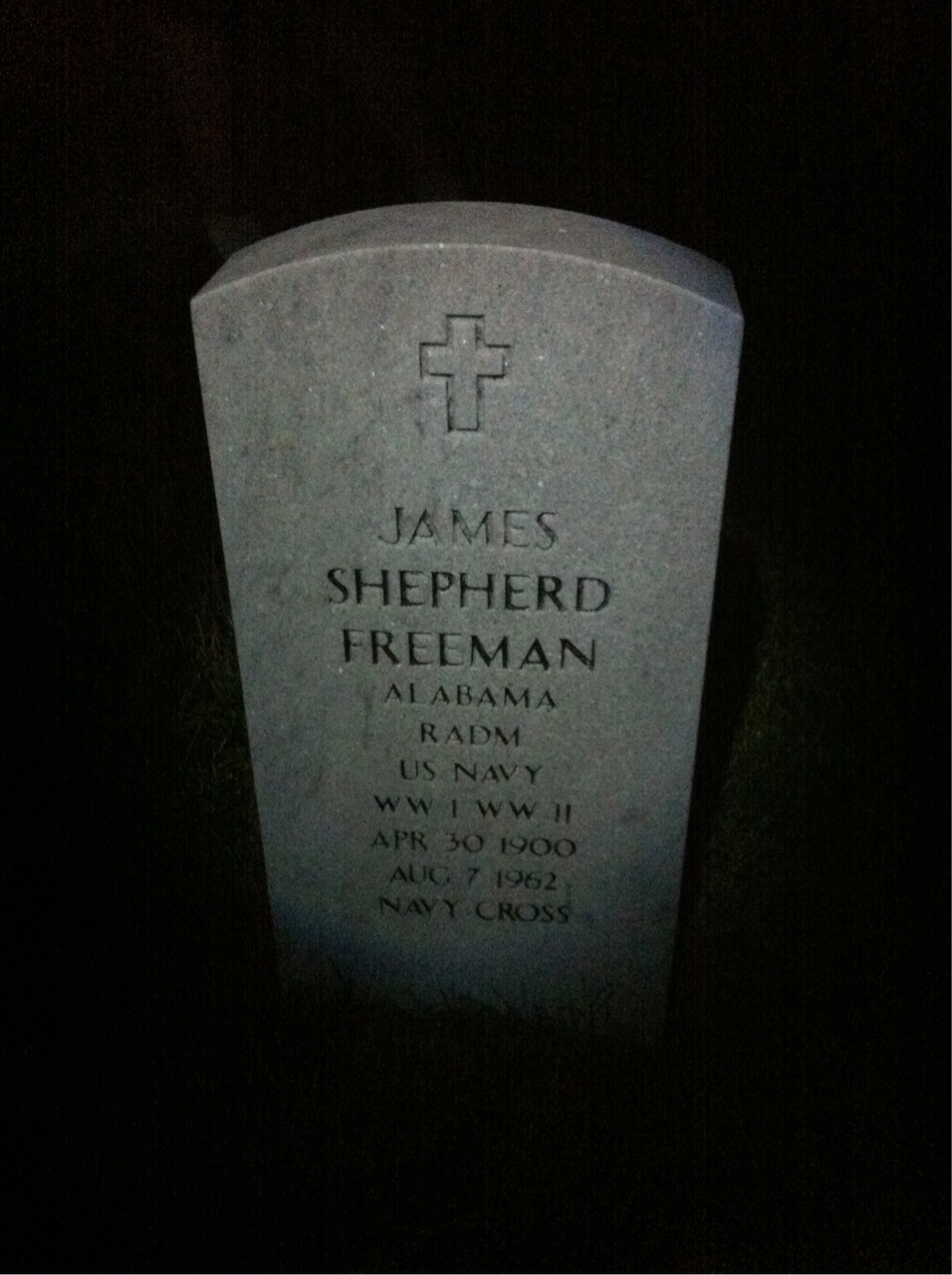
- Grave at Arlington National Cemetery
- Born: April 30, 1900; Jasper, Alabama, U.S.
- Died: August 7, 1962 (aged 62); Bethesda, Maryland, U.S.
- Military career
- Allegiance: United States
- Branch: United States Navy
- Service years: 1921–1951
- Rank: Rear admiral
- Commands: USS Alchiba
- Conflicts: World War II
- Awards: Navy Cross

James Shepherd Freeman (1900 – 1962) was a World War II admiral in the United States Navy and the son of the Alabama millionaire James Stanley Freeman.

== Early life ==
Freeman was born on April 30, 1900, in Jasper, Alabama. He entered the United States Naval Academy on July 20, 1917 and graduated 58th in his class in 1921 before entering a career in the Navy.

== Career ==
His assignments before World War II included as chief executive officer of the US Naval Base at Pearl Harbor in Hawaii.

While commander of the USS Alchiba, he was assigned to bring supplies and ammunition to marines stationed in Guadalcanal. On November 28, 1942, his ship was torpedoed by two Japanese midget submarines. Freeman ordered the Alchiba's engines turned to full throttle and ran the ship ashore, saving the lives of the crew and ensuring that the much-needed ammunition was not lost. Freeman received the Navy Cross for his actions.

The admiral is also featured in the self-described "UFO disclosure" documentary Fastwalkers: They Are Here as the commander of a naval ship whose crew reported sightings of extraterrestrial activity at sea. In the film, Freeman is reported to have had photographs of UFOs that were supposed to be shown to other naval officers. It is unclear whether such photos existed or were ever made public.

== Personal life ==
He was married to Dorothea Steinmann Freeman. He is often referred to as "James Freeman, Sr." to distinguish him from his son, also named Jim.

His son James Shepherd Freeman, Jr., was born 1926 in San Diego, California and spent his childhood in Hawaii while his father was commanding at Pearl Harbor. He, too, entered the Naval Academy, but was later released on a medical discharge. He graduated in 1948 from Auburn University in Alabama and, in the same year, married Betty Jeane Pierce, daughter of the newspaper publisher Edgar H. Pierce. They had five children and ten grandchildren. Freeman Jr. died in 1997 in Jasper.

== Death ==
Freeman Snr. died on August 7, 1962, at the Bethesda Naval Hospital in Bethesda, Maryland, and is buried in Arlington National Cemetery. His wife survived him.
