= Bethany Teachman =

Canadian clinical psychologist

Bethany A. Teachman
- Education: University of British Columbia University of Melbourne Yale University
- Spouse: Brian Nosek
- Scientific career
- Fields: Neuroscience, Psychology
- Website: https://teachman.org/

Bethany A. Teachman is a Canadian clinical psychologist whose research focuses on how biased thinking contributes to anxiety disorders. She is a professor of Psychology and Director of Clinical Training at the University of Virginia and an expert on anxiety. At the University of Virginia, she runs the Program for Anxiety, Cognition, and Treatment (PACT) lab, which studies cognitive bias modification and uses digital technologies, such as apps and web-based cognitive bias modification programs, in attempts to shift anxious thinking. Dr. Teachman is on the governing board of the Society for Digital Mental Health.

== Early life and education ==
Teachman studied at the University of British Columbia (UBC) on the West coast of Canada, where she pursued a major in psychology. During her third year, Teachman participated in an exchange program at the University of Melbourne in Australia.

Teachman worked as a research assistant under the supervision of Stanley Rachman, a psychologist known for his research in anxiety and obsessive-compulsive disorder (OCD). Her honors thesis focused on moral psychology and moral development.

Teachman was subsequently accepted into the PhD program in clinical psychology at Yale University, where she worked under the mentorship of Dr. Sheila Woody. During her time at Yale, Teachman met her future spouse, Brian Nosek, who was also pursuing a PhD at the institution (in the field of social psychology).

== Research ==
Teachman leads the Program for Anxiety, Cognition, and Treatment (PACT) lab at the University of Virginia, where she studies emotional dysregulation, notably in anxiety disorders. She is the Principal Investigator for multiple projects, including Project Implicit Mental Health, initiated in September 2011, which is a public website designed to evaluate autonomic mental health associations, and MindTrails, launched in the Spring of 2016, which is another public website dedicated to studying online cognitive bias modification.

Teachman is the recipient of an American Psychological Association Presidential Citation for her "leadership in advancing evidence-based practice in psychology and in applying technology to mental health research and practice."

== Selected publications ==
- Bernstein, D. A., Teachman, B. A., Olatunji, B. O., & Lilienfeld, S. O. (2020). Introduction to clinical psychology: Bridging science and practice (Ninth edition). Cambridge University Press.
- Teachman, B. A., Schwartz, M., Gordic, B., & Coyle, B. (2003). Helping your child overcome an eating disorder: What you can do at home. Oakland, CA: New Harbinger.
- Woody, S., Detweiler-Bedell, J., Teachman, B. A., & O’Hearn, T. (2002). Treatment planning in psychotherapy: Taking the guesswork out of clinical care. New York: Guilford Press.
