= James M. Freeman =

American anthropologist

James M. Freeman (born 1936 in Chicago, Illinois) is an American anthropologist, and professor emeritus at San Jose State University.

== Life ==
Son of philosophy professor Eugene Freeman, James graduated from Northwestern University (B.A.), and then from Harvard University with an MA, and a Ph.D. in Social Relations in 1968. A former Fellow of the Center for Advanced Study in the Behavioral Sciences at Stanford University, Freeman won an American Book Award in 1990 for Hearts of Sorrow: Vietnamese-American Lives. He was co-founder and chair of the Board of Directors of Friends of Hue Foundation from 2000-2006.

== Awards ==
- 1998-2001 Alfred P. Sloan Foundation grant
- 1998-2000 National Science Foundation grant.
- 1990 American Book Award, for Hearts of Sorrow: Vietnamese-American Lives
- 1983 - 1984 National Endowment for the Humanities Fellowship.
- 1983 National Endowment for the Humanities Summer Stipend.

== Selected works ==
- "Rites of Obscenity: Chariot Songs of Eastern India." The Journal of Popular Culture. Vol. 10, issue 4 (Spring, 1977): 882-896. ISSN 0022-3840 <https://doi.org/10.1111/j.0022-3840.1977.1004_882.x>
- James M. Freeman (1979). Untouchable: An Indian Life History. Stanford University Press. ISBN 978-1-3152-0674-5.
- "Caste as pernicious injustice: Berreman's perspective on social inequality." Reviews in Anthropology. Vol. 7, issue 3 (1980): 337-356. <https://doi.org/10.1080/00988157.1980.9977511>
- Hearts of Sorrow: Vietnamese-American Lives. Stanford University Press. 1989. ISBN 978-0-8047-1890-5.
- "Work as Mission in an Immigrant Community and Its Homeland." Anthropology of Work Review, vol 22, issue 1 (March, 2001): 13-16. <https://doi.org/10.1525/awr.2001.22.1.13>
- James M. Freeman; Nguyen Dinh Huu (2005). Voices From The Camps: Vietnamese Children Seeking Asylum. University of Washington Press. ISBN 978-0-295-98359-2.
- Charles N. Darrah; James M. Freeman; June Anne English-Lueck (2007). Busier than Ever! Why American Families Can’t Slow Down. Stanford University Press. ISBN 978-0-8047-5492-7.
