= Walker County Hospital =

Historic building in Alabama, US

- U.S. National Register of Historic Places
- Alabama Register of Landmarks and Heritage
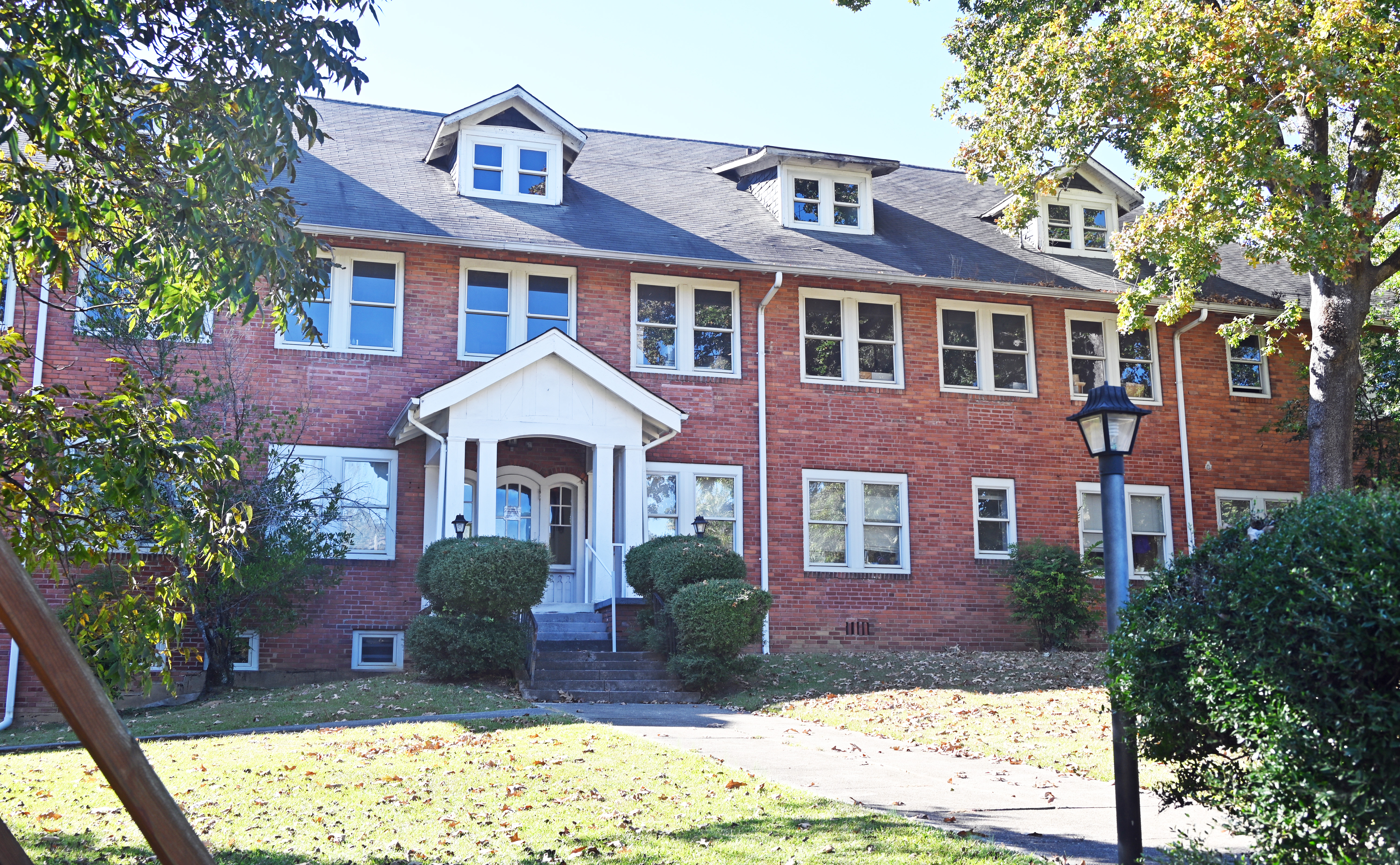
- Building in 2022, also known as the Lovett Building

- Location within Alabama
- Location: 1100 7th Ave., Jasper, Alabama
- Coordinates: 33°50′26″N 87°16′59″W
- Area: 2.5 acres (1.0 ha)
- Built: 1923
- Built by: Wm. Leslie Welton; Wilson, L.J.
- NRHP reference No.: 85001160

Significant dates
- Added to NRHP: May 30, 1985
- Designated ARLH: September 6, 1984

The Walker County Hospital, at 1100 7th Ave. in Jasper, Alabama, was built in 1923. It was listed on the National Register of Historic Places in 1985.

It is an E-shaped, two-story brick building which served from 1923 to 1980 as a hospital, and, up to 1936, as the only hospital in Walker County.
