= James Stanley Freeman =

American businessman (1874–1960)

James Stanley Freeman (May 12, 1874 in Jasper, Alabama – April 26, 1960 in Jasper, AL), known as "Big Jim", was an Alabama millionaire in the early 20th century.

== Life ==
He was famous for making and losing over a million dollars twice before 1900. Freeman retired as one of the wealthiest men in the Southern United States. He was married to Willie Lee Shepherd, had one son, James Shepherd Freeman, a World War II admiral. His grandson was James Shepherd Freeman Jr., and his great-grandson was James Shepherd Freeman III.

He was appointed as the city manager of Jasper in 1952. He served in this role until his resignation in 1955.

== Death and personal life ==
Freeman was involved in an automobile accident in 1950.

In 1957, his wife died of an illness.
