= Samuel A. and Margaret Stevenson House =

Historic house in Iowa, United States

- U.S. National Register of Historic Places
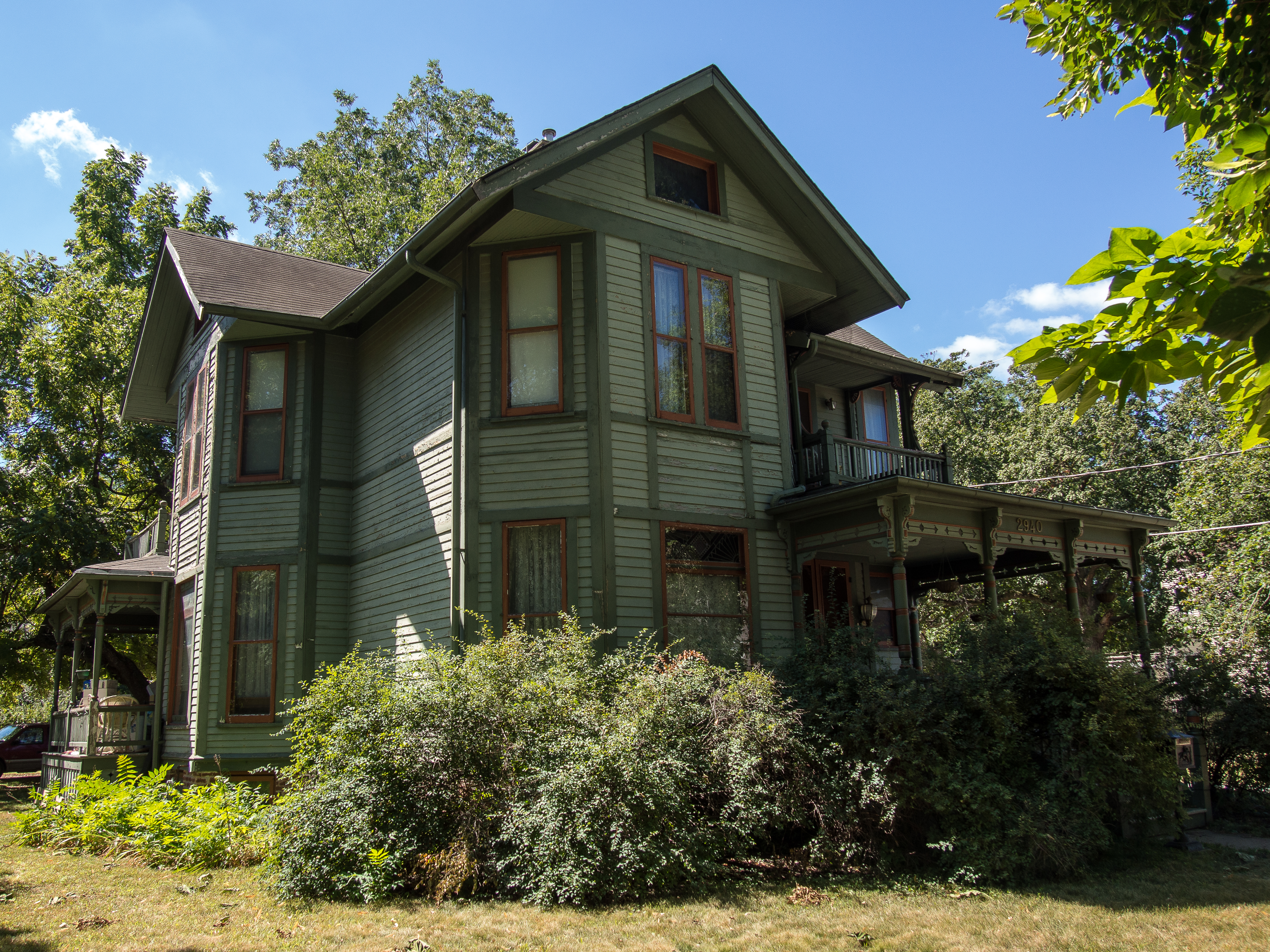

- Location within Iowa Location within the United States
- Location: 2940 Cottage Grove Ave. Des Moines, Iowa
- Coordinates: 41°35′53.9″N 93°39′32.8″W
- Area: less than one acre
- Built: 1889
- Architectural style: Stick/Eastlake
- NRHP reference No.: 85000008
- Added to NRHP: January 3, 1985

The Samuel A. and Margaret Stevenson House is a historic building located in Des Moines, Iowa, United States. This is the best preserved example of the residential architecture that combines the Stick and Eastlake styles in the city. In the suburban areas of the city in the late 19th century this was one of the most common residential styles. Most of them have been either demolished, significantly altered, or lost most of their character by being covered over with siding. The Stevensons bought the property in 1889 from the Vermont Syndicate, who developed Kingman Place. They mortgaged the property for $2,687.50 to the syndicate immediately after they bought it, probably for them to build their house for them from a pattern book or stock plan design. The two-story wood-frame structure features exterior walls of painted clapboards, vertical and horizontal trim boards, and capped with a crossgabled roof. The house was listed on the National Register of Historic Places in 1985.
