= Gilchrist House (Cordova, Alabama) =

- U.S. National Register of Historic Places
- The house before its destruction

- Location within Alabama Location within the United States
- Nearest city: Cordova, Alabama
- Coordinates: 33°38′4″N 87°21′23″W
- Area: less than one acre
- Built: 1812
- NRHP reference No.: 72000188
- Added to NRHP: March 24, 1972

The Gilchrist House was a historic farmhouse near Cordova in Walker County, Alabama. Built when Alabama was still a part of the Mississippi Territory, it was considered by architectural scholars as one of the older surviving houses in Alabama and the oldest structure in the central and western area of the state. It was added to the National Register of Historic Places on March 24, 1972. It was destroyed by fire during the late 1990s, but the site remains listed on the National Register.

== History ==
The Gilchrist House was built by Edmon (also spelled Edmond, Edmund) Gilchrist, who migrated to Alabama from Edgefield, South Carolina. He first settled in Lowndes County, but relocated to Walker County and built the house in 1812 on land granted to him by the Federal government. The house was still owned by his descendants when it was listed on the National Register during the early 1970s.

== Architecture ==
The house was a two-story wooden timber frame structure, elevated on piers. The original portion was rectangular, with one upstairs room over one downstairs room. Bookend chimneys were present on each side of the two-story structure. A one-story side wing and a full-width porch were added in the late 1880s and early 1900s.
