= Stephenson House (Oakman, Alabama) =

Historic house in Alabama, United States

- U.S. National Register of Historic Places
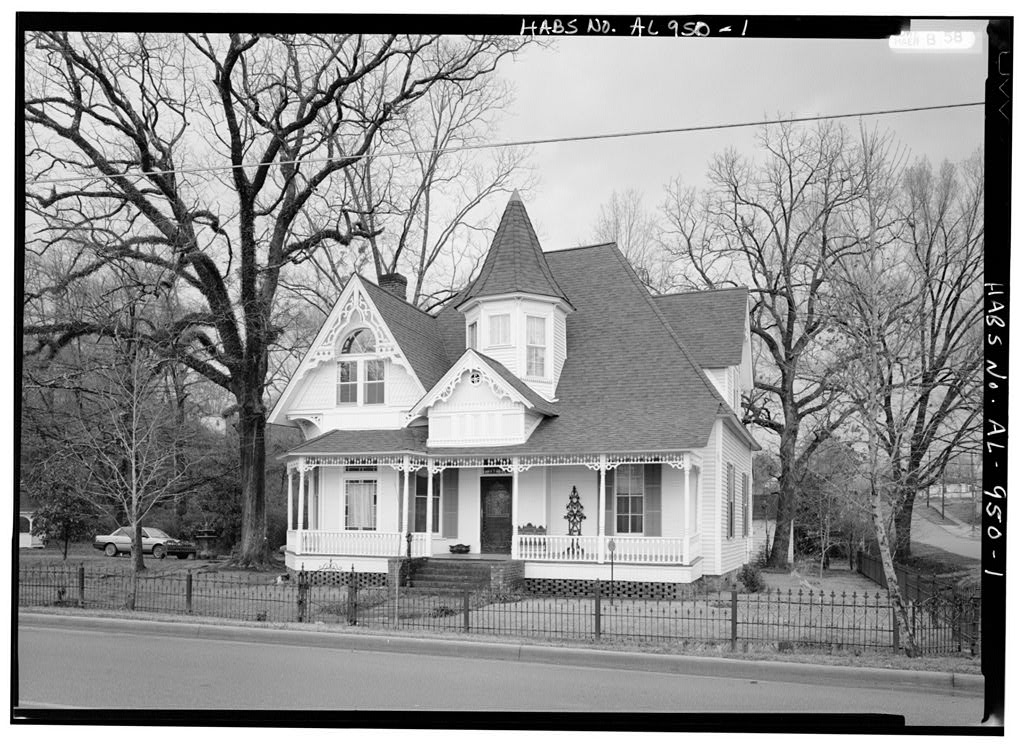
- HABS photo of Stephenson House in 1993

- Location within Alabama Location within the United States
- Location: Cobb St., Oakman, Alabama
- Coordinates: 33°42′54″N 87°23′16″W
- Area: 1.1 acres (0.45 ha)
- Built: 1887
- Architectural style: Queen Anne, Queen Anne-Eastlake
- NRHP reference No.: 78000510
- Added to NRHP: September 18, 1978

The Stephenson House was built in 1887 in Oakman, Alabama. The Eastlake style house is one of the oldest houses in town, built for Dr. Hugh Watson Stephenson using purchased stock plans. Stephenson was a prominent local physician and state legislator. The house retains its period detailing and intricate carving.

The 1 1/2-story house features elaborate scrollwork on the gables and the front porch. A turret rises from a low dormer over the front door. The house was placed on the National Register of Historic Places on September 18, 1978.
