= Jasper, Alabama =

City in Alabama, United States

- City
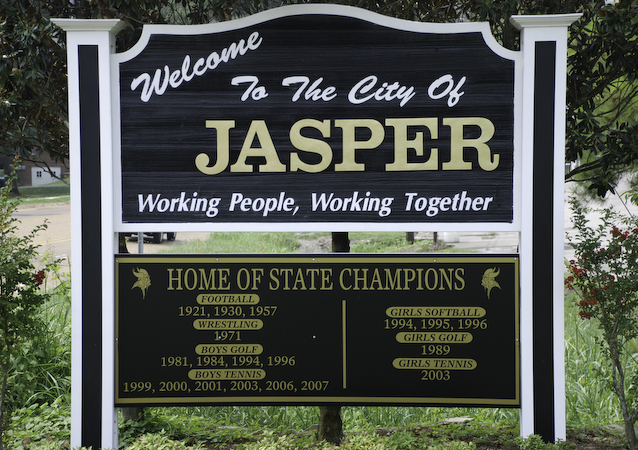
- Welcome to Jasper sign

- Flag Seal
- Motto(s): "Experience from the past, knowledge for the future."
- Location of Jasper in Walker County, Alabama.
- Coordinates: 33°51′32″N 87°16′08″W
- Country: United States
- State: Alabama
- County: Walker
- Established: 1887

Area
  - Total: 29.66 sq mi (76.83 km^{2})
  - Land: 29.33 sq mi (75.97 km^{2})
  - Water: 0.33 sq mi (0.86 km^{2})
- Elevation: 390 ft (120 m)

Population (2020)
  - Total: 14,586
  - Density: 496.8/sq mi (191.82/km^{2})
- Time zone: UTC-6 (Central (CST))
  - Summer (DST): UTC-5 (CDT)
- ZIP codes: 35501-35504
- Area codes: 205, 659
- FIPS code: 01-38416
- GNIS feature ID: 2404790
- Website: http://www.jaspercity.com/

Jasper is a city in and the county seat of Walker County, Alabama, United States. As of the 2020 census, Jasper had a population of 14,586. Named in honor of Sergeant William Jasper, an American Revolutionary War hero, Jasper was settled around 1815 and incorporated on August 18, 1886.

The first significant growth of the area was in 1886 when the Kansas City, Memphis and Birmingham Railroad and the Sheffield & Birmingham Railroads were completed through Jasper. The population grew from 200 people in 1886 to more than 3,000 in 1890. In a special edition in 1891, the Mountain Eagle stated there were six coal mines, two sandstone quarries, 400 coke ovens, one foundry and machine shop, two saw mills, one brick works, four hotels, and two banks.

== Historic sites ==
Jasper has several sites listed on the National Register of Historic Places. These include the John Hollis Bankhead House, First United Methodist Church, Jasper Downtown Historic District, and Walker County Hospital.

== Geography ==
According to the U.S. Census Bureau, the city has a total area of 26.9 square miles (70 km^{2}), of which 26.9 square miles (70 km^{2}) is land and 0.04% is water.

=== Climate ===
Climate data for Jasper, Alabama, 1991–2020 normals, extremes 1960–2017
Month	Jan	Feb	Mar	Apr	May	Jun	Jul	Aug	Sep	Oct	Nov	Dec	Year
Record high °F (°C)	77 (25)	84 (29)	90 (32)	94 (34)	96 (36)	102 (39)	108 (42)	105 (41)	100 (38)	92 (33)	86 (30)	78 (26)	108 (42)
Mean maximum °F (°C)	70.1 (21.2)	75.4 (24.1)	81.8 (27.7)	85.5 (29.7)	89.8 (32.1)	94.6 (34.8)	96.4 (35.8)	96.9 (36.1)	93.8 (34.3)	86.6 (30.3)	78.3 (25.7)	70.3 (21.3)	98.4 (36.9)
Mean daily maximum °F (°C)	52.0 (11.1)	56.2 (13.4)	65.0 (18.3)	73.3 (22.9)	80.2 (26.8)	86.3 (30.2)	89.8 (32.1)	89.7 (32.1)	84.4 (29.1)	74.4 (23.6)	63.7 (17.6)	54.7 (12.6)	72.5 (22.5)
Daily mean °F (°C)	41.3 (5.2)	44.9 (7.2)	52.7 (11.5)	60.6 (15.9)	68.9 (20.5)	76.0 (24.4)	79.7 (26.5)	79.1 (26.2)	73.3 (22.9)	61.9 (16.6)	51.3 (10.7)	44.0 (6.7)	61.1 (16.2)
Mean daily minimum °F (°C)	30.6 (−0.8)	33.5 (0.8)	40.5 (4.7)	48.0 (8.9)	57.6 (14.2)	65.7 (18.7)	69.6 (20.9)	68.5 (20.3)	62.2 (16.8)	49.4 (9.7)	39.0 (3.9)	33.2 (0.7)	49.8 (9.9)
Mean minimum °F (°C)	12.3 (−10.9)	16.4 (−8.7)	22.8 (−5.1)	30.5 (−0.8)	41.5 (5.3)	52.6 (11.4)	61.4 (16.3)	60.1 (15.6)	44.7 (7.1)	32.1 (0.1)	23.4 (−4.8)	16.0 (−8.9)	9.5 (−12.5)
Record low °F (°C)	−10 (−23)	2 (−17)	6 (−14)	25 (−4)	31 (−1)	40 (4)	49 (9)	51 (11)	32 (0)	22 (−6)	10 (−12)	−2 (−19)	−10 (−23)
Average precipitation inches (mm)	6.05 (154)	6.01 (153)	5.77 (147)	5.95 (151)	5.31 (135)	4.70 (119)	4.92 (125)	4.00 (102)	4.24 (108)	3.84 (98)	4.99 (127)	5.98 (152)	61.76 (1,571)
Average snowfall inches (cm)	0.1 (0.25)	0.2 (0.51)	0.3 (0.76)	0.0 (0.0)	0.0 (0.0)	0.0 (0.0)	0.0 (0.0)	0.0 (0.0)	0.0 (0.0)	0.0 (0.0)	0.0 (0.0)	0.0 (0.0)	0.6 (1.52)
Average precipitation days (≥ 0.01 in)	10.0	8.6	10.0	8.7	9.1	10.3	10.6	9.3	6.9	6.5	8.4	9.7	108.1
Average snowy days (≥ 0.1 in)	0.1	0.2	0.0	0.0	0.0	0.0	0.0	0.0	0.0	0.0	0.0	0.1	0.4
Source 1: NOAA
Source 2: National Weather Service

== Demographics ==
In 2020, it was reported that of Alabama cities with populations of at least 10,000 people as of 2010, Jasper was among the five fastest to decline in population over the 2010s.

Historical population
Census	Pop.	Note	%±
1880	269		—
1890	780		190.0%
1900	1,661		112.9%
1910	2,509		51.1%
1920	3,246		29.4%
1930	5,313		63.7%
1940	6,847		28.9%
1950	8,589		25.4%
1960	10,799		25.7%
1970	10,798		0.0%
1980	11,894		10.2%
1990	13,553		13.9%
2000	14,052		3.7%
2010	14,352		2.1%
2020	14,572		1.5%
2026 (est.)	14,586	▲	0.1%
U.S. Decennial Census

=== 2020 census ===
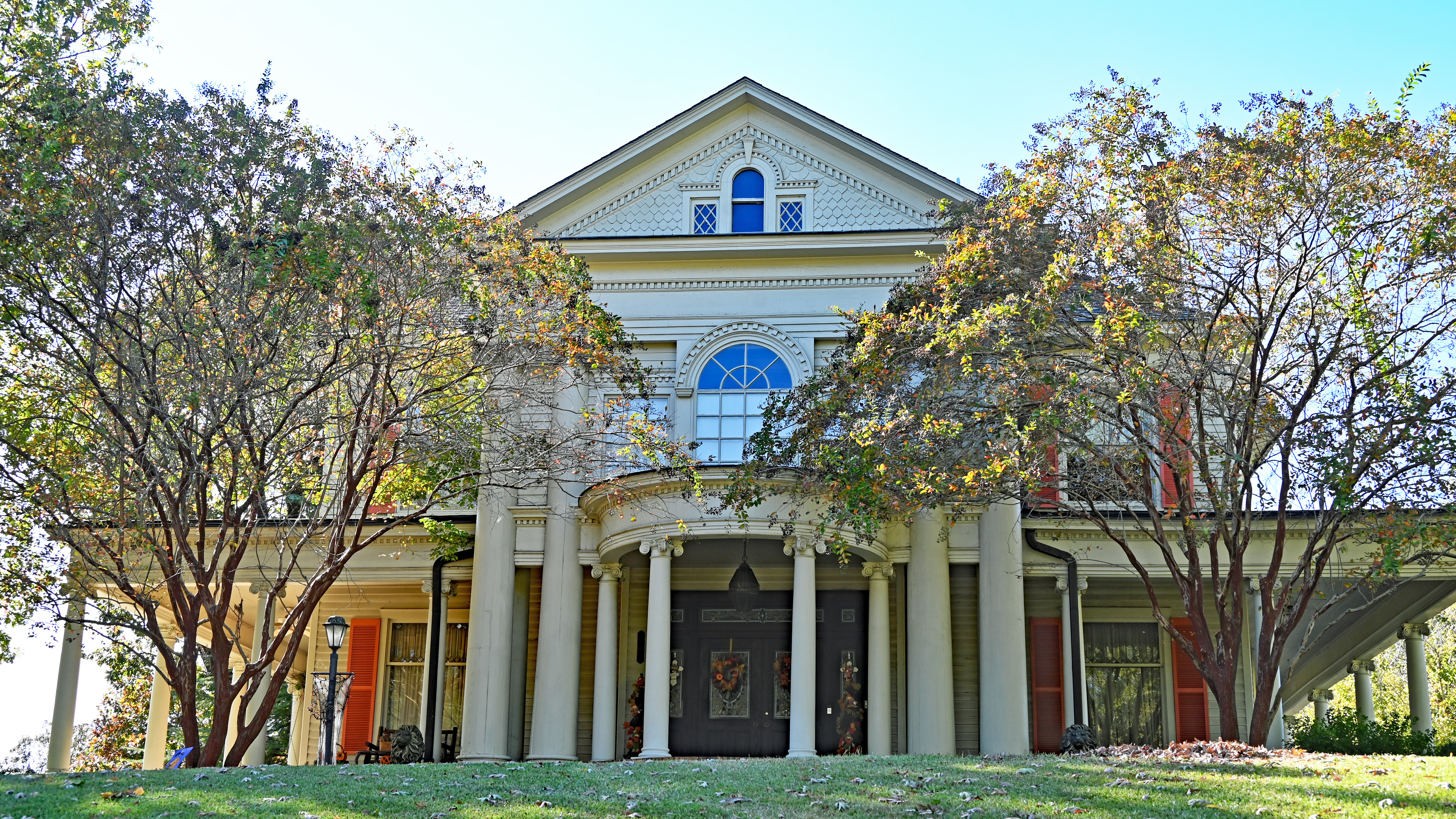
House at 1300 7th Ave.

As of the 2020 census, Jasper had a population of 14,572. The median age was 41.8 years. 21.5% of residents were under the age of 18 and 21.8% of residents were 65 years of age or older. For every 100 females there were 91.7 males, and for every 100 females age 18 and over there were 89.7 males age 18 and over.

85.0% of residents lived in urban areas, while 15.0% lived in rural areas.

There were 5,705 households in Jasper, of which 30.1% had children under the age of 18 living in them. Of all households, 45.9% were married-couple households, 17.2% were households with a male householder and no spouse or partner present, and 32.1% were households with a female householder and no spouse or partner present. About 31.2% of all households were made up of individuals and 14.9% had someone living alone who was 65 years of age or older.

There were 6,300 housing units, of which 9.4% were vacant. The homeowner vacancy rate was 2.1% and the rental vacancy rate was 10.0%.

Racial composition as of the 2020 census
Race	Number	Percent
White	11,225	77.0%
Black or African American	1,905	13.1%
American Indian and Alaska Native	115	0.8%
Asian	162	1.1%
Native Hawaiian and Other Pacific Islander	2	0.0%
Some other race	521	3.6%
Two or more races	642	4.4%
Hispanic or Latino (of any race)	1,026	7.0%

=== 2010 census ===
At the 2010 census, there were 14,352 people, 5,760 households, and 3,831 families living in the city. The population density was 533.5 inhabitants per square mile (206.0/km^{2}). There were 6,478 housing units at an average density of 241 per square mile (93/km^{2}). The racial makeup of the city was 81.3% White, 13.4% Black or African American, 0.3% Native American, 0.7% Asian, 0.2% Pacific Islander, 0.l.

Of the 5,760 households 27.3% had children under the age of 18 living with them, 49.2% were married couples living together, 13.9% had a female householder with no husband present, and 33.5% were non-families. 31.1% of households were one person and 14.6% were one person aged 65 or older. The average household size was 2.33, and the average family size was 2.91.

The age distribution was 21.9% under the age of 18, 8.6% from 18 to 24, 25.8% from 25 to 44, 24.0% from 45 to 64, and 19.7% 65 or older. The median age was 41 years. For every 100 females, there were 86.6 males. For every 100 females age 18 and over, there were 82.5 males.

The median household income was $33,044 and the median family income was $43,674. Males had a median income of $35,182 versus $22,868 for females. The per capita income for the city was $19,491. About 10.2% of families and 13.8% of the population were below the poverty line, including 18.3% of those under age 18 and 13.2% of those age 65 or over.

=== 2000 census ===
At the 2000 census, there were 14,052 people, 5,728 households, and 3,809 families living in the city. The population density was 523.0 inhabitants per square mile (201.9/km^{2}). There were 6,473 housing units at an average density of 240.9 per square mile (93.0/km^{2}). The racial makeup of the city was 84.15% White, 13.98% Black or African American, 0.21% Native American, 0.53% Asian, 0.02% Pacific Islander, 2.7% some other race, and 1.4% two or more races. 4.4% of the population was Hispanic.

Of the 5,728 households 26.1% had children under the age of 18 living with them, 47.4% were married couples living together, 14.4% had a female householder with no husband present, and 33.5% were non-families. 29.7% of households were one person and 13.2% were one person aged 65 or older. The average household size was 2.38, and the average family size was 2.93.

The age distribution was 21.5% under the age of 18, 8.1% from 18 to 24, 24.4% from 25 to 44, 27.7% from 45 to 64, and 18.3% 65 or older. The median age was 41.5 years. For every 100 females, there were 90.3 males. For every 100 females age 18 and over, there were 95.3 males.

The median household income was $41,586 and the median family income was $54,059. Males had a median income of $51,548 versus $35,248 for females. The per capita income for the city was $27,927. About 14.8% of families and 16.7% of the population were below the poverty line, including 29.5% of those under age 18 and 11.1% of those age 65 or over.

== Arts and culture ==
Jasper is the location of the SyFy Channel's documentary show Town of the Living Dead. The city is home to the annual Foothills Festival in Historic Downtown Jasper Square, which features live music and food vendors. In the TV series Lost, Jasper is the hometown of James "Sawyer" Ford.

The 2020 documentary film Jasper Mall centers around the economically distressed Jasper Mall.

== Education ==
- T.R. Simmons Elementary School (grades preK–1)
- Memorial Park Elementary School (grades 2–3)
- Maddox Intermediate School (grades 4–6)
- Jasper Junior High (grades 7–8)
- Jasper High School (grades 9–12)
- North Highlands School (for students with disabilities across all grades)

== Media ==
=== Newspaper ===
- Daily Mountain Eagle (daily)

=== Radio ===
- WJLX/1240 kHz
- WIXI/1360 kHz
- WQJJ-LP/101.9 MHz
- W268BM/101.5 MHz: rebroadcasts WJLX

On February 2, 2024, it was discovered that the 200-ft tower of WJLX had been stolen.

=== Television ===
- W25FC-D/25

== Notable people ==
- Jason Aaron, comic writer
- John H. Bankhead II, U.S. senator from Alabama
- Tallulah Bankhead, actress
- Walter W. Bankhead, U.S. representative from Alabama
- William Brockman Bankhead, speaker of the U.S. House of Representatives
- Tom Bevill, U.S. representative from Alabama
- Ronnie Coleman, NFL player
- Eric Dover, musician
- Eric Esch, professional boxer, MMA fighter and kick boxer
- Raymond D. Fowler, psychologist and professor at the University of Alabama
- James Shepherd Freeman, admiral, United States Navy
- James Stanley Freeman, businessman
- Michael A. Grinston, 16th sergeant major of the U.S. Army
- Polly Holliday, actress
- Steven Jack Land, renewal theologian
- George Lindsey, actor
- Carter Manasco, U.S. representative from Alabama
- Terry Owens, NFL player
- Sandy Posey, singer
- Jim Pyburn, professional baseball player
- Greg Reed, Alabama state senator
- Michael Rooker, actor
