= Dreier sisters =

The Dreier sisters were four American sisters from New York City, who separately and collectively achieved public recognition for their activism and philanthropic social reform activity.

The sisters were:

- Margaret Dreier Robins (1868–1945), labor leader and philanthropist
- Dorothea A. Dreier (1870–1923), painter
- Mary Elisabeth Dreier (1875–1963), New York social reformer
- Katherine Sophie Dreier (1877–1952), artist, lecturer, art patron and social reformer
