= John R. Palandech =

Serbian-American entrepreneur

John R. Palandech (1873–23 September 1959) was a Serbian American entrepreneur, publisher and Republican politician in Illinois from the Guilded Age until the Cold War era.

== Biography ==
=== Early life ===
Ivan Palandačić was born in Sulina in 1873 during Ottoman rule to ethnic Serb parents Rade and Paraskeva Palandačić, the oldest of eight children (George, Sam, Ivana, Andja, Mara, Joko, and Luka). Shortly thereafter, the family returned to their homeland, Montenegro, where they first settled in Luštica before moving to their ancestral homestead in the Bay of Kotor region. The family lived in the village of Babunica near Tivat. Rade Palandačić was a wealthy merchant who ensured his children received a well-rounded education and enrolled them in the best bilingual (Serbian and German) grammar schools and high schools. When Ivan turned 15, then a Gymnasium graduate, his father sent him overseas to the United States to his cousin in Monterey, California, to further his education. There, Ivan graduated from a business college.

=== Career ===
Upon graduation in 1893, Ivan Palandičić decided to move to Chicago, where he Americanized his name to John R. Palandech. It was the year of the World's Columbian Exposition, and young Palandech was fascinated by the World's Fair that attracted international attention to the second-largest city in the United States. It was at that time that Palandech was introduced to the Serbian community and opened a restaurant with the money he had saved over the past five years, working odd jobs while still a student at Monterey College. From then on, he went into business, operating a chain of successful restaurants, with seven locations in Chicago. The establishments were all located in the business area called the Chicago Loop. Later, Palandech purchased a local printing house, then founded his own print shop, bookstore, and became publisher, writer, and editor of several newspapers, weeklies, notably the United Serbians and, much later, the magazine Jugoslavija.

In Chicago at the time, a Montenegrin Serb, Krsto Gopčević, one of the leaders, wrote a letter to Serbia's Metropolitan Mihailo, who sent Archimandrite Firmilijan Drazic to organize the Serbs into the Church-School Congregation of the Holy Resurrection. Twelve years later, the collective efforts of the Serbian community were realized with the establishment of the first Serbian Orthodox church in Chicago.

In the meantime, John Palandech became a naturalized U.S. citizen at the height of the progressive Movement in America in 1897. In 1901, he married Irish-American Catherine Leonard, and the couple settled in a three-story house at 3215 West Flournoy Street between Garfield and Douglas parks, an affluent neighbourhood. They had three daughters (Catherine, Veronica, and Catherine-Marie) and a son (John Jr.).

In 1905, Palandech co-founded and was the first president of the church council of the Holy Resurrection Serbian Orthodox Cathedral, then located in Wicker Township Park in Chicago.

In the same year, the weekly newspaper, United Serbians (Ujedinjeno Srpstvo), was launched as the official organ of the First Fraternal Benevolent Federation (FFBF). Almost all of his publications were printed in Serbian Cyrillic script. A member of the executive committee of the National Security League during the Great War, Palandech was a member of a committee which welcomed Marshall Joseph Joffre and ex-Premier René Viviani of France to Chicago. He also served on the Liberty bond committee with Anton Cermak during the First World War. He was the president of the Serbian Committee that organized walks in support of the Allied cause with international celebrity and suffragette Emmeline Pankhurst, along with diplomats, publishers and bankers.

Palandech was also the founding president of the First Fraternal Benevolent Federation in Chicago from 1905 until 1909, when his fraternity leadership tenure came to an end. That released Palandech's "United Serbians" and gave him a free hand in editing and expanding the subscription and advertising. Palendech devoted his life to Serbians in the U.S., running for public office in Cook County and Illinois politics. He would soon become a public figure beyond his ethnic community. He was a strong supporter of his colleague William Hale Thompson when he became a candidate for mayor of Chicago in 1915 and again in 1927, both times elected.

Palandech also acted as a board member of the American Association of Foreign Language Newspapers (AAFLN) when Frances Kellor took over the position of Louis Nicholas Hammerling, whose American patriotism came into question.

The 1914 war posed dilemmas for every American, including Palandech and other ethnic publishers. As a Serb, he spoke in support of Serbia against Austria-Hungary. German-speaking immigrants supported Kaiser's Germany and Austria-Hungary by attempting to keep the U.S. out of the war from 1914 to 1917. John R. Palandech's name surfaced (without his consent) under a German-sponsored anti-war ad in the Tägliches Cincinnatier Volksblatt on 5 April 1915. It belonged to a campaign by the Axis powers to steer U.S. public opinion away from entering the war than it already was. The American Association of Foreign Language Newspapers' Hammerling had been used as a platform to spread such sentiments. Palandech and other media leaders had spoken out in favor of U.S. engagement on the Allied side.

In September 1915, Palandech was named Serbian/Montenegrin consul for the second time. Fuelled by gossip and intrigue over Palandech's supposed signature on an anti-war petition against U.S. weapons to be sent to the Allies, Mihajlo Pupin writing in The New York Times called Palandech "a bogus Serbian leader." Palandech's response came via the same newspaper by calling Pupin "a Hungarian". Early on, however, the two immediately reconciled, Pupin realizing that Palandech could not have endorsed such an idea. Pupin and Palandech always supported unification with Croats and Slovenes from the beginning of the Great War through his publication Balkanski Svijet.

In February 1922, Palandech had the Yugoslav Constitution translated into English.

From 1918 to 1923, when Palandech served as president of the AAFLN.

In his function as a board member of the Cook County Commissioners, Palandech attended the 62nd anniversary of the first Republican National Convention in Chicago's LaSalle Hotel with members of the foreign-language press present.

In 1933, a Century of Progress International Exhibition was held in Chicago, and Palandech was chairman of the Yugoslav division of the committee. He organized a Yugoslav Day, inviting the most distinguished Serbian Americans (Nikola Tesla, Mihajlo Pupin, Paul Radosavljevich, and John David Brcin. By 1934, John Palandech had launched a Yugoslav radio program on the WWAE frequency. It was on Sundays from one to two o'clock in the afternoon. Businessmen were invited to advertise and participate in promoting their wares. The station became so successful and profitable that Palandech sold it five years later to Marshall Field III, the investment banker and owner of the Chicago Sun at the time.

Palandech made two visits to the Kingdom of Yugoslavia, one in 1935 and the other in 1939, leaving Europe just as World War II was beginning.

John R. Palandech died on 23 September 1959.

== Sources ==
- Fischer-Nebmaier, Wladimir (2019). "John R. Palandech (1874–1956): The Many Faces of a Chicago Transatlantic Immigrant Media Man" (PDF). Journal of Austrian-American History. 3 (1): 26–87. doi:10.5325/jaustamerhist.3.1.0026.
