= Long Ridge, Danbury, Connecticut =

Historic neighborhood in Danbury, Connecticut, United States

- Neighborhood
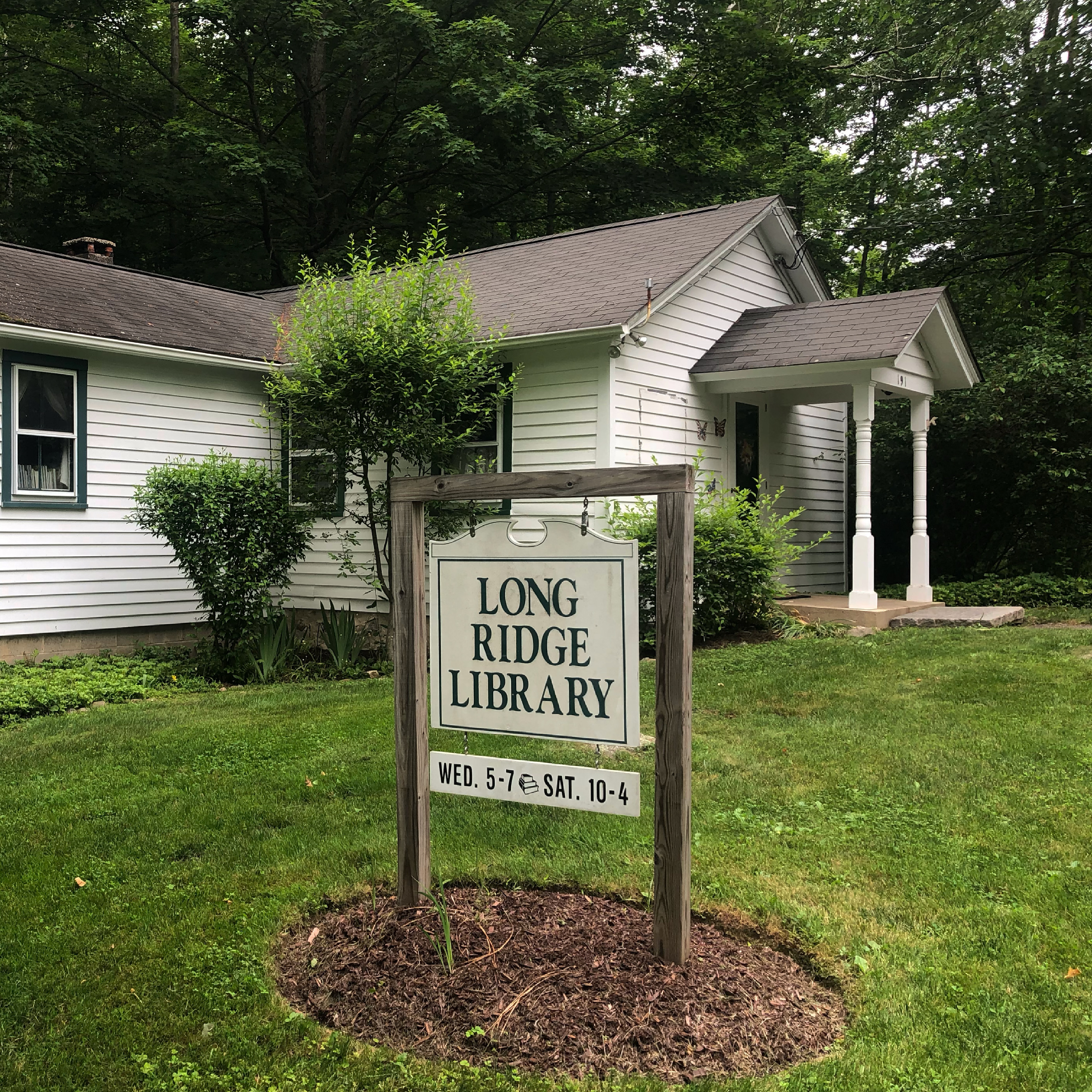
- The Long Ridge Library

- Location in Connecticut Location in the United States
- Coordinates: 41°20′2.72″N 73°26′32.64″W
- Country: United States
- U.S. state: Connecticut
- County: Fairfield
- Region: Western CT
- City: Danbury
- ZIP Code: 06810

Long Ridge is a historic rural neighborhood in the southeastern corner of Danbury, Connecticut. Located east of the Starrs Plain neighborhood and south of Tarrywile Park, it borders Redding to the south and Bethel to the east. The neighborhood’s main thoroughfare, Long Ridge Road, is Danbury’s only designated scenic road.

== History ==
In 1730, Norwalk native Daniel Wood built the first house on Long Ridge Road. He later opened an inn on the property. However, the community remained primarily an agricultural settlement, described in 1896 as boasting "pleasant farmhouses and fertile acres." Onions were a particularly abundant crop in the area.

Long Ridge was recognized as a district in 1769, when a committee of the First Society of Danbury proposed dividing the town into several school districts.

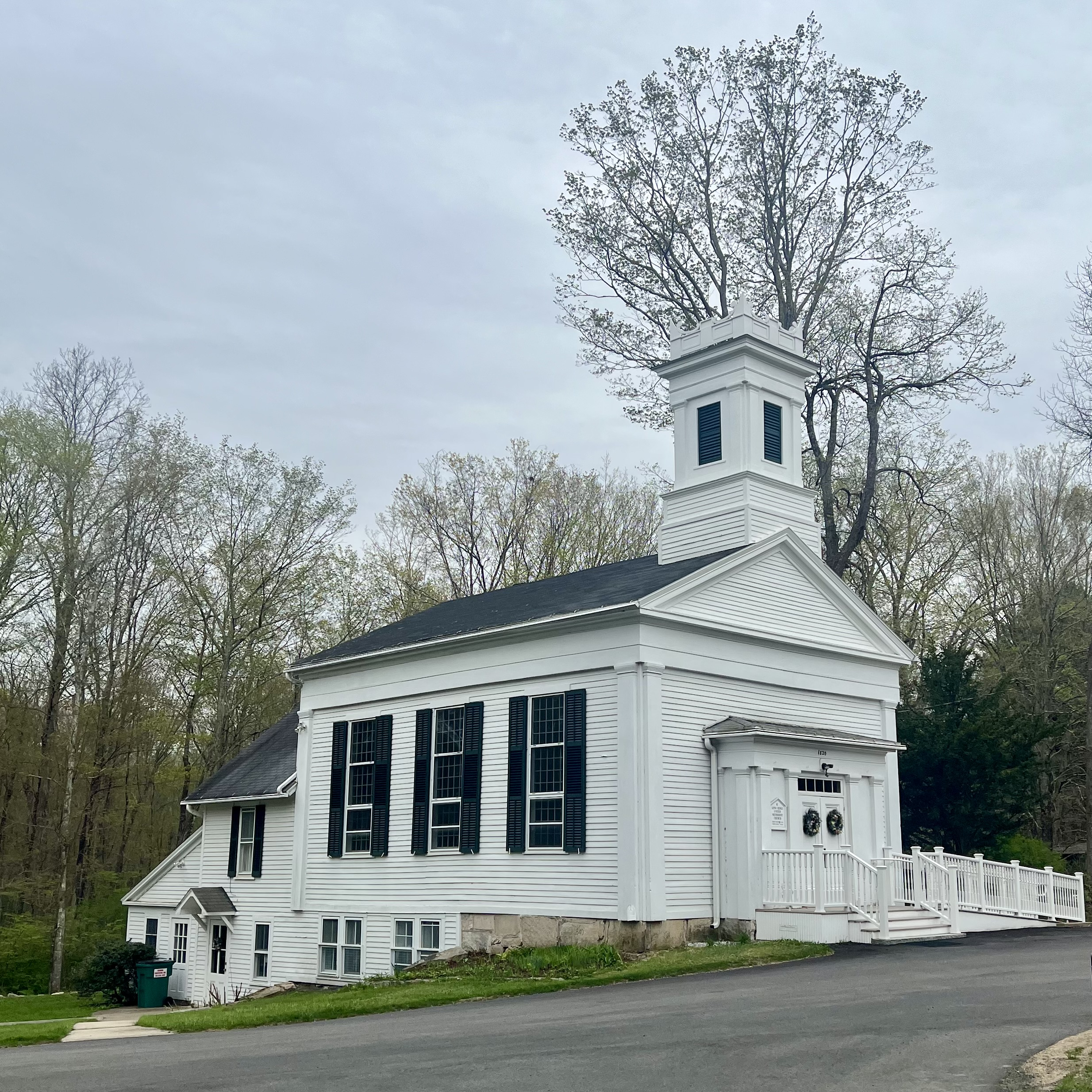
Long Ridge United Methodist Church

Residents of Long Ridge and neighboring Starrs Plain formed a Methodist society and built a church just north of the West Redding border in 1820. As the congregation outgrew the small building, a larger Greek Revival church was constructed in 1842.

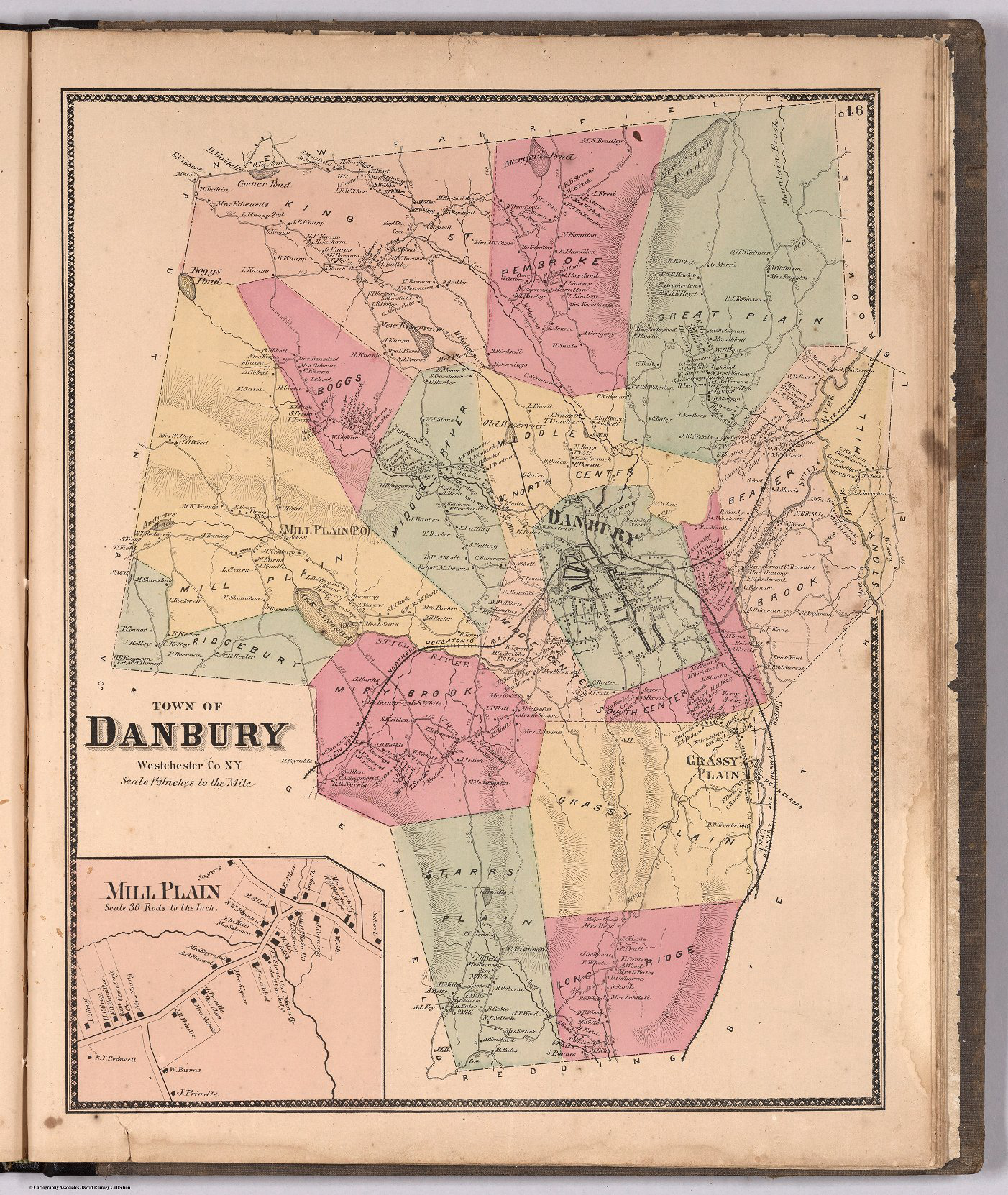
1867 Map of Danbury (Long Ridge District at the bottom right).

The Long Ridge Cemetery was established in 1864, initially serving as a private burying ground for the Wood family, before eventually opening to the community.

By the early 20th century, Long Ridge had developed into an arts and literary colony, attracting a number of writers and artists to the area. In 1916, Marietta Tibbits and Frances Abbott founded the Long Ridge Women's Club. The club established its own library three years later, and in 1921 the Town of Danbury deeded the abandoned Long Ridge schoolhouse to the club for use as the Long Ridge Library, which remains open to the public.

Notable residents during this period included Broadway playwright and director Rachel Crothers, who purchased the historic "Roadside" estate in 1918 as her country retreat, and modernist artist, lecturer, and social reformer Katherine Dreier, who settled in the area in 1920. Dreier was active in the community, particularly through the Long Ridge Women’s Club, and in 1941 attempted to transform her property, known as "The Haven," into a country museum.

Dreier lived in Long Ridge until 1942, when she sold the property. The estate subsequently became home to Jesse Lee Academy, before becoming the Institute of Children's Literature in 1969.

=== Preservation efforts ===
Over the years, multiple community organizations have been formed to preserve the character of Long Ridge. In the early 1970s, the Long Ridge District Association was organized in response to a planned Route 7 extension and a proposed cable television tower. In 1985, the installation of aluminum siding on a historic farmhouse prompted residents and local preservationists to petition for historic district designation.

In 2015, the Long Ridge Neighborhood Preservation Association mobilized against a proposed church development at the former Katherine Dreier estate, which residents believed could threaten the rural character of the community.

== Geography ==
Long Ridge Road approaching West Redding

Long Ridge is centered along the Long Ridge Road corridor in southeastern Danbury, near the Redding border. The neighborhood takes its name from a prominent drumlinoidal hill, a glacial landform, on which it is primarily situated along the eastern flank.

Located to the east is Bethel, which shares with Danbury a 630-acre (250 ha) tract of land known as Terre Haute. Although 208 acres (84 ha) of this land lies within the bounds of Danbury, it is owned entirely by Bethel. The portion of Terre Haute within Danbury’s boundaries contains two reservoirs, Eureka Lake and Mountain Pond.

The reservoirs are a part of Bethel’s water supply system, serving the residents of downtown Bethel. Proposals for the infrastructure, which included a 750,000 US gal (2,800,000 L) water tank, drew opposition from Long Ridge residents and Danbury officials, who cited potential impacts on the Long Ridge community, an area that includes some of the city’s most expensive homes. The project was ultimately approved after an agreement was reached to move the tank storage farther into the woods and away from neighboring properties along the scenic road.

There are 108 acres (44 ha) of preserved open space in the Long Ridge area protected by the Northwest Connecticut Land Conservancy, consisting of upland forest, wetlands, and streams. The former Wiedel property, now known as Wiedel Meadows, makes up 69 acres (28 ha) of this land. The 18-mile (29 km) Ives Trail, which extends through Danbury, Bethel, Redding, and Ridgefield, passes through Long Ridge by way of this preserve.

== Notable residents ==
- Roger Burlingame, historian and author
- Thomas Maitland Cleland, book designer, illustrator, and typographer
- Rachel Crothers, playwright and theater director
- Jean Dalrymple, Broadway producer and theater manager
- Katherine Dreier, abstract artist, collector, and co-founder of the Société Anonyme
- Ted Shawn, dancer, choreographer, and co-founder of Jacob's Pillow
- John Toland, historian and Pulitzer Prize-winning author
- R. Gordon Wasson, banker, author, and ethnomycologist
