= Chinsegut Hill Manor House =

Historic house in Florida, United States

- U.S. National Register of Historic Places
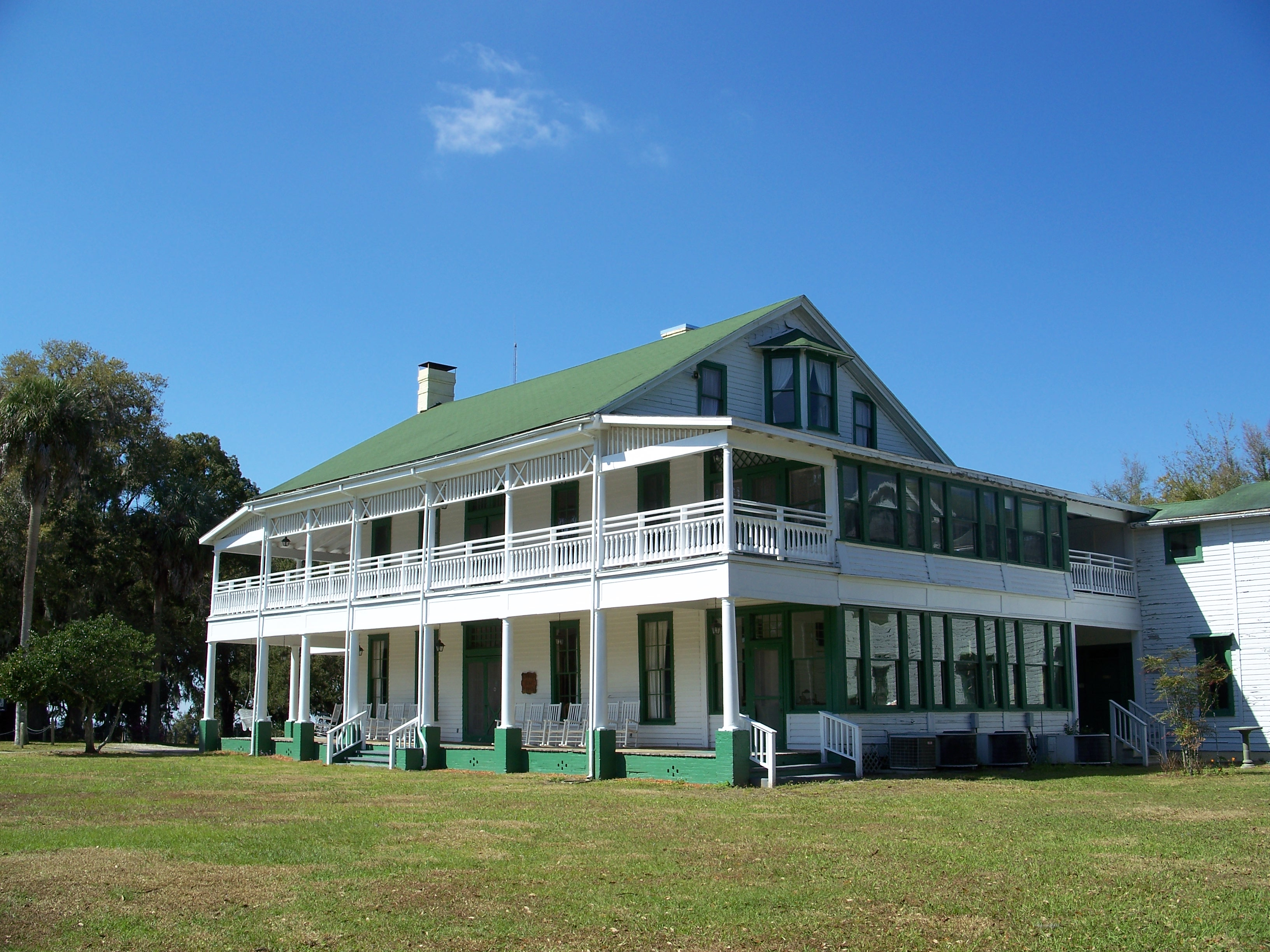

- Location within Florida Location within the United States
- Location: Hernando County, Florida
- Nearest city: Brooksville
- Coordinates: 28°37′7″N 82°21′54″W
- Built: 1847–1925
- Architectural style: Frame Vernacular
- NRHP reference No.: 03001171
- Added to NRHP: November 21, 2003

The Chinsegut Hill Manor House (also known as Mount Airy, Snow Hill, or simply The Hill) is an historic site about five miles northeast of Brooksville, Florida, on Chinsegut Hill. Chinsegut Hill, at an elevation of 269 feet (82 m), is one of the highest points in peninsular Florida. It is in Hernando County north of the city of Brooksville.

The manor's address is 22495 Chinsegut Hill Road. Begun in the early 1850s, the structure has remained relatively unchanged since.

Established as a plantation house, the manor changed hands and as a retreat was visited by many prominent people. It was eventually leased to the University of Florida and the University of South Florida, which added cabins, a dining hall, and other structures making the property more suitable for use as a conference setting. It is now managed as a historical site and museum with the cabins rentable for weddings or other events.

== History ==
With the conclusion of the Second Seminole War (1835–1842) and the passing of the Armed Occupation Act on August 4, 1842, the character of Florida was transformed. In the interior of the Florida peninsula, devoid of white settlement just 10 years before, plantations were rapidly established. By the eve of statehood, planters maintained that nearly half the population and wealth of the territory was now located in central Florida.

Drawn to central Florida by the opportunity offered by the Armed Occupation Act, Colonel Byrd Pearson from South Carolina laid claim to 160 acres in what is now Hernando County. He named his plantation Mount Airy and began cultivating sugarcane with the use of slave labor. Pearson constructed a cabin on the site that is now the East Wing of the Manor. Pearson's cabin was completed just two years after Florida became a state.

In 1851, Pearson sold the property to another South Carolinian emigrant to Florida named Francis Higgins Ederington. When Ederington purchased the property, he named it Mt. Airy. Between 1852 and 1854, Ederington constructed the manor house.

In 1866, Colonel Russel Snow (also a South Carolinian) married Francis Ederington's daughter Charlotte and gained control of the plantation, renaming it Snow Hill. The Snows remodeled the third-floor attic into three bedrooms and a seating area.

== Ederington/Snow Era ==
In 1851, Anderson Mayo and Francis Ederington of South Carolina visited Hernando County and were very much impressed with what they found. Ederington and Mayo were wealthy plantation owners from the Piedmont section in South Carolina. Francis Ederington purchased from Colonel Byrd Pearson the property now referred to as Chinsegut Hill. Ederington then returned home to Fairfield County, South Carolina. In 1852, Francis Ederington and his family moved from South Carolina to Florida, bringing with them their livestock, farming equipment and household goods together with 30 enslaved people. They settled on the hill and named it Mount Airy. Colonel Pearson had built a small home there, but Francis Ederington replaced it with the present manor house. The main initial production at Mount Airy was sugar cane, cotton, and corn. They expanded into citrus and livestock and also harvesting timber. When the Great Freeze of Florida came in 1895, even though groves were frozen out, several trees on top of Mount Airy/ Snow Hill survived and were used to provide bud stock for nurseries and groves that were later acquired and helped to restart Florida's citrus production. It is believed to be the oldest house remaining in Hernando County.

Francis Ederington raised a large family of eight daughters and three sons. One of the sons, Mallory, went away to college and died there. Joseph died as an infant. The other son, Frank Jr., continued to live in Hernando County and died when he was ninety-four years old. He did not have any children. All the girls married, with the exception of Caroline who died at age 20. Many of the descendants of the Ederington women reside in and around Hernando County today.

Francis Ederington was a member of the old Guards Mounted Rangers during the Civil War.

Dorothy Ederington, daughter of Francis Ederington, married John J. Hale, the son of Joseph Hale and one of early pioneers of Hernando County. John and Dorthy Ederington Hale were the grandparents of Alfred A. McKethan.

Charlotte Ederington, daughter of Francis Ederington, married Dr. James R. Snow from Georgetown, South Carolina. Dr. J.R. Snow first came to Hernando County in 1861 leaving the same year with C Company of the 3rd Florida Infantry for the Civil War. Charlotte and J.R. bought the interests of her sisters in Mount Airy and renamed the property Snow Hill. Dr. J.R. Snow practiced dentistry in the Manor House. The Snows added the porches to the first and second floor and a screened in porch on the east side of the manor.

Many of Charlotte and J.R.'s descendants live in Hernando County today. Ernest Winfield Snow, grandson of Dr. J.R. Snow, raised 18 children born to two wives; Hedick (who died in childbirth with her 9th child) and Cora McKeown—all born in the Manor House on Snow Hill. Ernest Snow's family was the last Snow family to inhabit the manor house—leaving the home for a larger estate following a hurricane. Many of Ernest Snow's children went on to become prominent business and civic leaders in Hernando County including Eugene Snow, operated one of Brooksville's oldest companies: Snow's Lumber Yard; Juanita Snow Rogers, former owner and operator of Brooksville's Quality Shop; Jim Snow, a noted Hernando historian and occupier of "Snow Hill"; Arthur L. "Roy" Snow, served with distinction in World War II as a captain in the 30th Infantry and received commendations which included the Silver Star and Bronze Star for valor and Purple Heart received for wounds received in action in both World War II and Korean War. Later Roy Snow was named by the governor to the Hernando County Board of County Commissioners and served many years as a commissioner. Roy Snow's started Snow & Bell, Inc. in Brooksville which is still run by his family today.

Five generations of Ederingtons and Snows were born on Mounty Airy/ Snow Hill; six generations lived there, starting with Ederington.

== The Robins' Era ==
Possibly the most historically significant period for the Chinsegut Hill manor house occurred during the stewardship of Elizabeth, Raymond and Margaret Robins. Elizabeth purchased the home for herself and her youngest brother Raymond. But following the purchase and before they had moved in, Raymond met and married Margaret Dreier. Upon their acquisition of the property in 1904, Raymond and Elizabeth renamed the property Chinsegut Hill and set out to improve the grounds. Over the years, Raymond and Margaret added a kitchen to the east wing of the house, a widow's walk and ventilator, the west chimney, an expanded study, and a music room. The Robins later added four bathrooms (1911), acquired additional land (1917), added the porte-cochere (1925), and added a fifth bathroom, electricity, and a well (1933).

In addition to their tremendous expansion of the property itself, the Robinses were involved in politics. Raymond served as an advisor for all seven US Presidents from Teddy Roosevelt to Franklin Delano Roosevelt. During the Russian Revolution, Raymond was appointed by President Wilson as the Commissioner of the American Red Cross Mission to Russia where he met with numerous Russian dignitaries including Alexander Kerensky, Leon Trotsky, and Vladimir Lenin. Raymond was the only American at this time to meet with Lenin and did so four times a week for five months Margaret Robins, 18 year President of the National Women's Trade Union League, dined with President Calvin Coolidge in 1923 while her husband was being considered for a cabinet post. In 1928, Raymond was present at the signing of the Pact of Paris and was called upon to help plan the presidential campaign of Herbert Hoover.

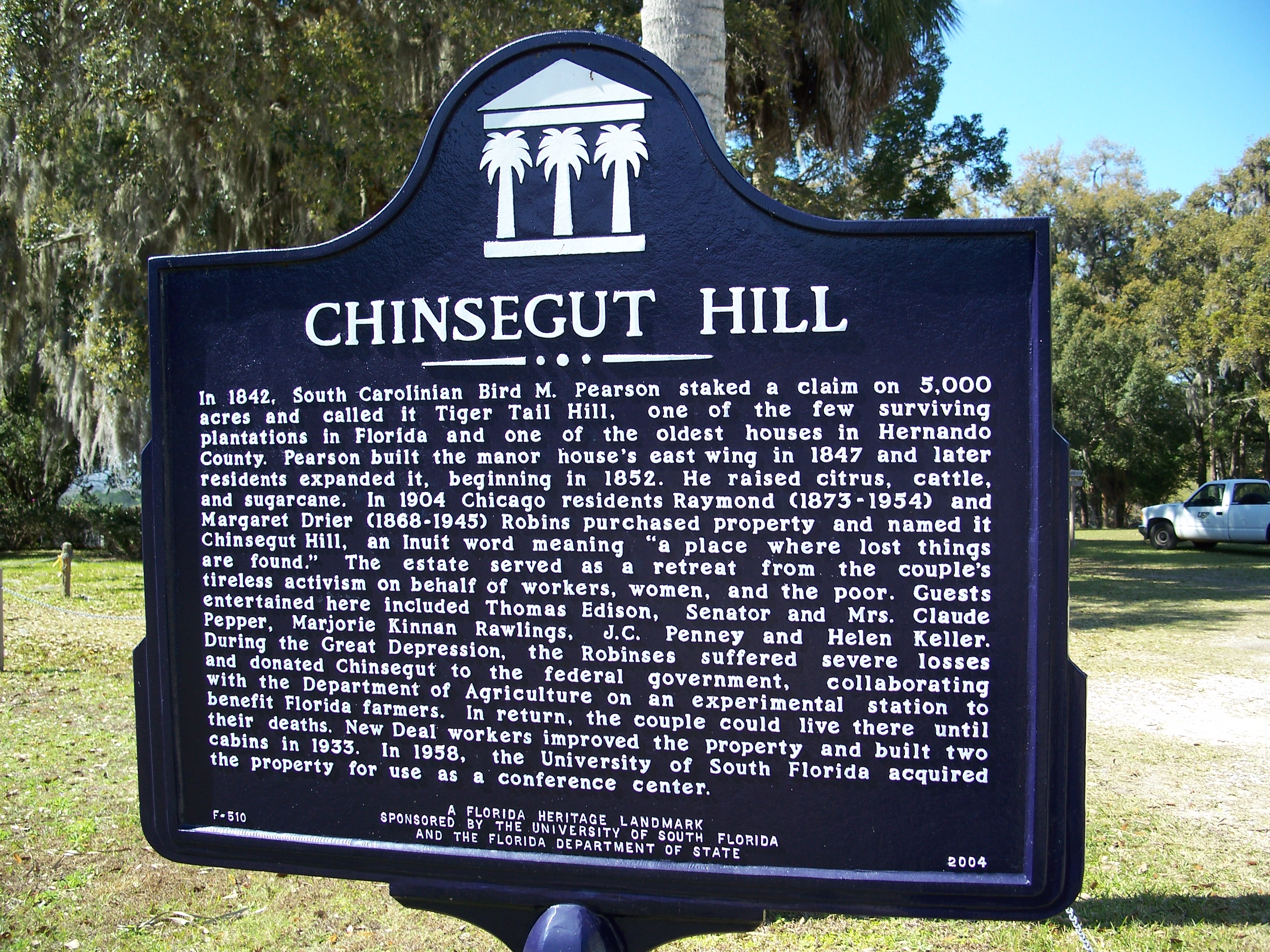
Historical marker

The Wall Street crash of 1929 left the Robins in financial difficulty because they chose to give almost $250,000 of their money to keep the First National Bank in Brooksville from folding. Using his connections with Herbert Hoover and his administration, Raymond brokered a deal to donate the Chinsegut Hill estate to the government with the stipulation that the couple be allowed to live there until their deaths, free of property taxes.

After years of illness, Margaret Robins died in 1945. Remaining active in political affairs for several years after his wife's death, Raymond Robins died in 1954. In the same year the University of Florida signed a four-year lease for the property, intending to use the site as a branch library utilizing Robins' 8,000 volumes.

=== Famous Guests of Chinsegut Hill ===
During their occupation of the Chinsegut Hill property, the Robinses entertained countless prominent guests including Soviet ambassadors, Jane Addams, William Jennings Bryan, Thomas Edison, James Cash Penney, Marjorie Kinnan Rawlings, Senator Claude Pepper, Margaret Bondfield, Frances Kellor and U.S. Secretary of the Interior Harold L. Ickes.

== USF lease and use as conference center ==
In 1958, the lease signed by the University of Florida expired and the university removed the books housed in the manor house, essentially abandoning the property. During the same year the University of South Florida obtained the manor house and surrounding property, signing a four-year lease as the University of Florida had previously.

Under the governance of the University of South Florida, the Chinsegut Hill manor house has undergone several modifications and "modernizations" -in line with the university's intention to utilize the site as a conference center. The university signed a 20-year lease in 1962 and has since expended vast amounts of time and money to preserve and restore the property. Alterations to the manor house include the removal of the widow's walk and ventilator due rainwater leakage (1963), construction of several cabins (1972 & 1990s), a dining room (1982), a classroom (1986), a maintenance shop (1986), and a storage shed (1990).

During the 1960s, the house had many guests, from visiting researchers to USF faculty and friends. Sadly, many of the small items in the house were removed by visitors. The Chinsegut Hill manor house and the surrounding property has been plagued by the strain of age and deterioration. Many small outbuildings and a water tower have been demolished. The University of South Florida has done much to maintain the status quo of the property, but has done little to realize any meaningful efforts to restore the manor house to its previous glory. Much of the university's inaction stems from the history of slavery at the Chinsegut Hill property.

In 1982, the U.S. Department of Agriculture transferred the title of the Chinsegut Hill property to the University of South Florida once the previous lease had expired and the university had fulfilled its obligations regarding the lease.

On November 21, 2003, Chinsegut Hill was added to the United States National Register of Historic Places through a concerted effort by members of the faculty at the University of South Florida. The university returned the property to the State of Florida in 2008 at which time the non-profit group, The Friends of Chinsegut Hill, Inc. was formed to save the property and the dilapidated Manor. The Friends oversaw a $1.5 million renovation and operated the house as a Museum from 2015 until 2019.

In January 2020, the Tampa Bay History Center entered into a partnership with Hernando County to provide curatorial and interpretive services for Chinsegut Hill.

== Lenin plaque controversy ==
In 1959, Chinsegut Hill was embroiled in the Red Scare. A plaque was commissioned by Lisa von Borowsky, family friend of the Robins and caretaker of the property, and placed on the ground near the Lenin Oak. The plaque honored the wishes of Raymond Robins to commemorate the Russian Revolution's leader, Vladimir Lenin. In 1961, a group of Boy Scouts discovered the plaque and reported the find to the Tampa Tribune. During the ensuing media firestorm, the University of South Florida claimed to know nothing of the plaque in an attempt to disassociate the university with pro-communist innuendo. Increased outcry from the media and the general public led to an inquiry in front of a grand jury on May 4, 1961. Forty-three years and three days after Margaret Robins planted the oak tree on the property, Borowsky was forced to testify on her activities as well as those of the Robins.
