= Katherine Sophie Dreier =

American artist (1877–1952)

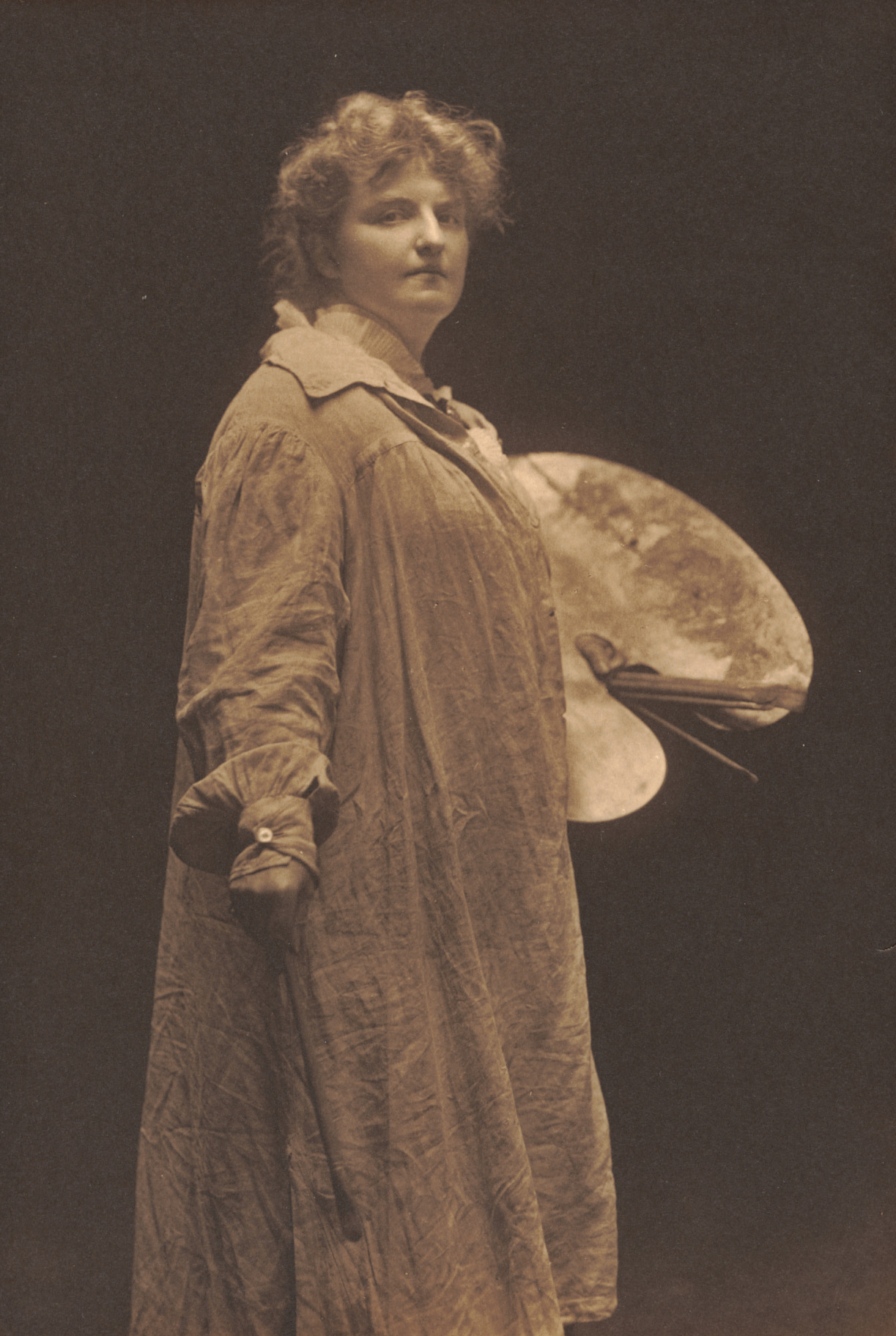
- Dreier in 1910
- Born: September 10, 1877; New York City, US
- Died: March 29, 1952 (aged 74)
- Education: Pratt Institute, Walter Shirlaw
- Known for: Abstract art

Katherine Sophie Dreier (September 10, 1877 – March 29, 1952) was an American artist, lecturer, patron of the arts, and social reformer. Dreier developed an interest in art at a young age and was afforded the opportunity of studying art in the United States and in Europe due to her parents' wealth and progressive attitudes. Her sister Dorothea, a Post-Impressionist painter traveled and studied with her in Europe. She was most influenced by modern art, particularly by her friend Marcel Duchamp, and due to her frustration with the poor reception that the works received, she became a supporter of other artists. She was co-founder of the Society of Independent Artists and the Société Anonyme, which had the first permanent collection of modern art, representing 175 artists and more than 800 works of art. The collection was donated to Yale University. Her works were exhibited in Europe and the United States, including the 1913 International Exhibition of Modern Art.

Dreier was also an active suffragette, attending the sixth convention of the International Woman Suffrage Alliance in Stockholm, Sweden as a delegate. She was the head of the New York City's German-American Committee of the Woman Suffrage party in 1915 and treasurer of the organization her mother established, German House for Recreation of Women and Children. She co-founded the German House for Recreation of Women and Children, and was its president. Two of her sisters were social reformers, Mary Dreier and Margaret Dreier Robins.

== Personal life ==
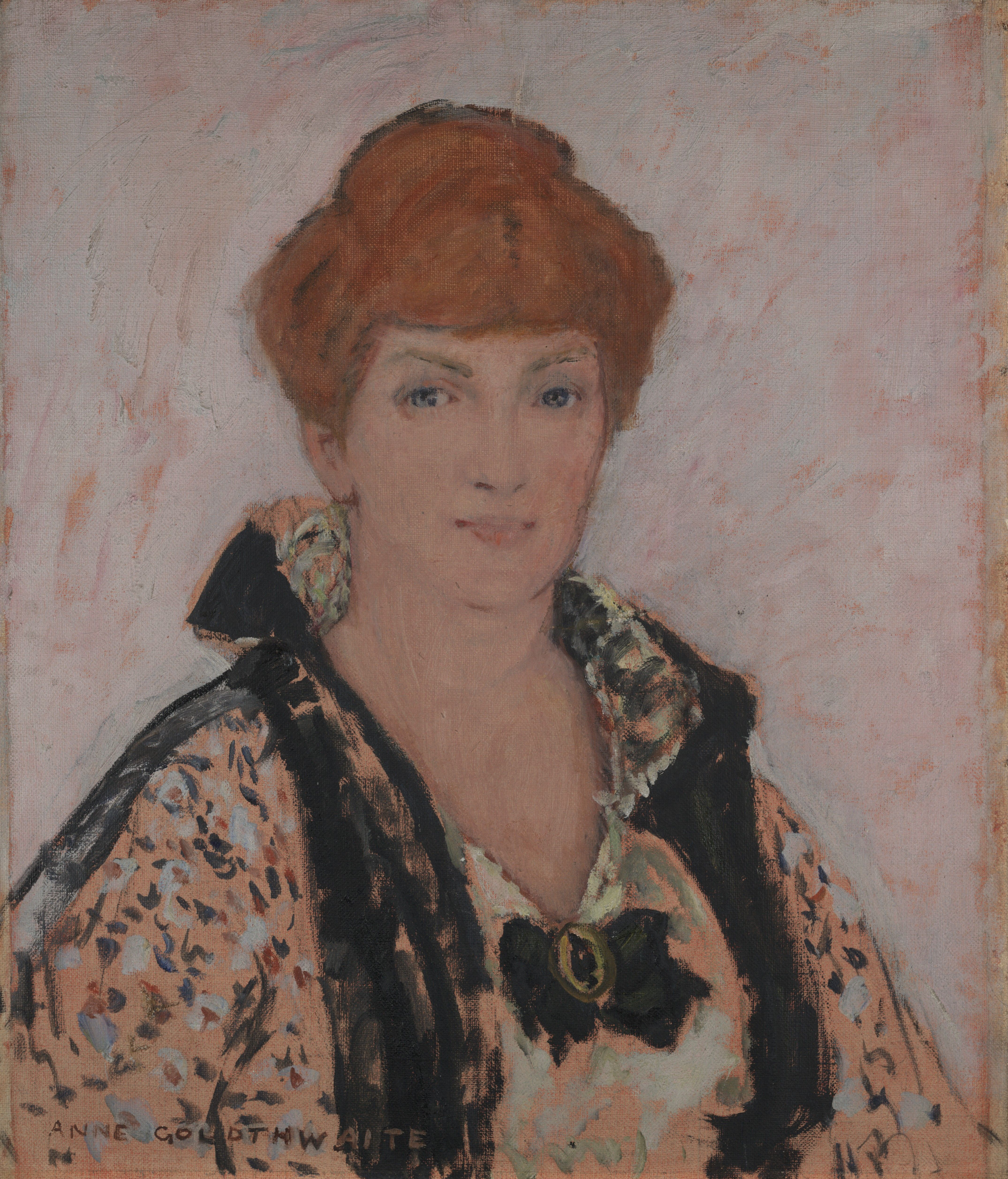
Anne Goldthwaite - Portrait of Katherine S. Dreier, between 1915 and 1916, Yale University Art Gallery

Katherine Sophie Dreier was born in Brooklyn, New York, on September 10, 1877. About this she stated "I was born in 1877. By a happy coincidence, three hundred years after Rubens ― and this fact has always influenced me. I had the feeling that some of his vitality and sensitiveness of color was a part of my artistic inheritance." Her parents, Theodor Dreier, a successful businessman, and Dorothea Dreier, were both immigrants from Germany. Her mother's maiden name was Dreier and her parents were cousins from Bremen, Germany. Their ancestors were civic leaders and merchants. Theodor came to the United States in 1849 and became partner of the English iron firm of Naylor, Benson and Company's New York branch. He married Dorothea in 1864 during a visit to Bremen, brought her back with him to the United States, and they lived in a brownstone house in Brooklyn Heights, New York.

Katherine Dreier had an older brother and three older sisters. Two of her sisters, Mary Elisabeth and Margaret were suffragettes and labor reformers. Her sister Dorothea was a Post-Impressionist painter. The family was a warm, close family, and Dreier was especially close to Mary, who she saw as an incredibly good person.

The Dreiers believed in offering the same opportunities to their daughters as would be made available to their son. They were democratic politically and cherished their German traditions. Dreier took art lessons each week when she was 12 years of age and she attended George Brackett, a private school in Brooklyn.

Her family was active in social causes in the community and from a young age, Dreier was involved in social and charitable causes. By 1900 her mother founded the German House for Recreation of Women and Children, where Katherine was treasurer on a volunteer basis from 1900 to 1909. She co-founded the Little Italy Neighborhood Association in Brooklyn in 1905 and was its president. Five years later she became one of the first directors of the Manhattan Trade School, an organization that sought to train young girls in the manual trades.

She met and became the fiancé of American painter Edward Trumbull, also known as Edward Trumbull-Smith, when she lived in London in 1911. In August 1911, she married him in Brooklyn at her home at 6 Montague Terrace, Brooklyn. Her brother-in-law, Raymond Robins, officiated the ceremony. Within weeks of the marriage, Dreier found out that he was already married and was convinced “that an English marriage was not legally binding in America.” She printed cards and mailed them to those who had received wedding announcements. The cards stated “The marriage on Aug. 8th of Katherine S. Dreier and Edward Trumbull being void on account of the existence of a former wife of Mr. Trumbull from whom he was not legally free, and the parties not having lived together as husband and wife, Mr. and Mrs. H Edward Dreier hereby recall their announcement of the marriage sent out before this fact was known.” This annulled the marriage and she subsequently returned to London.

A suffragette, she was involved in the International Woman Suffrage Alliance, attending its sixth convention in Stockholm, Sweden in 1911 as a delegate. She was the head of the New York City's German-American Committee of the Woman Suffrage party in 1915.

Dreier settled in the Long Ridge section of Danbury, Connecticut, just north of the town line with Redding, in 1920, where she resided for over two decades. During her time in the artist colony of Long Ridge, Dreier developed plans for a “Country Museum” at her home, The Haven, intended to house both the Société Anonyme collection and her personal collection of modern art. After unsuccessful efforts to secure support from Yale University, portions of the collection were transferred to the Yale Art Gallery beginning in 1941. Following Yale’s final refusal to fund the proposed museum, Dreier sold The Haven and relocated to Milford, Connecticut.

Dreier was financially secure following receipt of an inheritance after the death of her parents in the late 1890s.

== Education ==
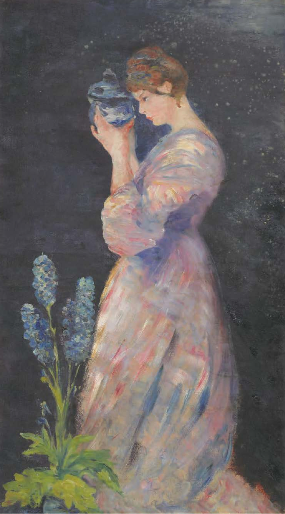
Katherine S. Dreier - The Blue Bowl - Armory Show 1913

Dreier studied art from 1895 to 1897 at the Brooklyn Art School. In 1900 she studied with her sister Dorothea at the Pratt Institute. She went to Europe in 1902 and traveled and studied the Old Masters there for two years with Mary Quinn and Dorothea. When she returned, Dreier had private lessons from painter Walter Shirlaw, who gave her a great foundation in the fundamentals of art and encouraged individual expression. For a quarter of a year in 1907, Dreier studied with Raphaël Collin in Paris and spent part of a year in 1912 studying under Gustaf Britsch, who she found to be the most accomplished of her teachers.

== Career ==
She created an altar painting for the Saint Paul's School chapel in Garden City, New York in 1905. She moved to Chelsea, London, England in 1909, living in a neighborhood that had been associated with Oscar Wilde and James Abbott McNeill Whistler. Dreier met writers and artists through Elizabeth Robins, who was the sister of Margaret Dreier Robins' husband, Raymond. While in London, she had periods of illness and doubt.

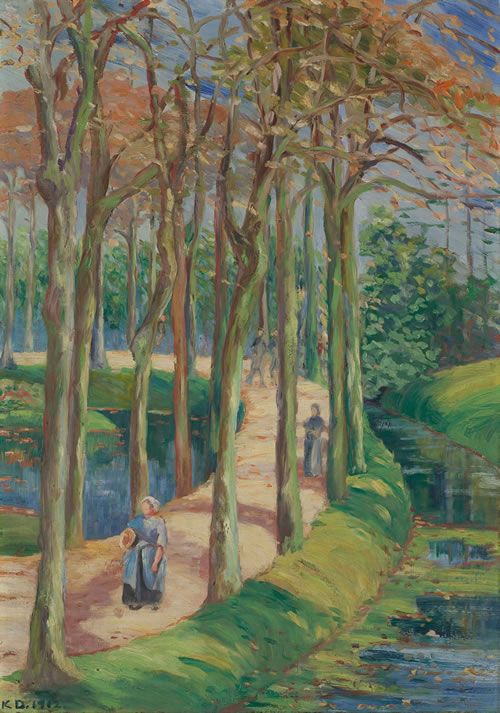
Katherine Sophie Dreier, Landscape with Figures in Woods or The Avenue, Holland, ca. 1911–12. Oil on canvas, 27 ¼ x 19 in. George Walter Vincent Smith Art Museum, Springfield, Massachusetts, Gift from the Artist's Estate.

Marcel Duchamp. Nude Descending a Staircase, No. 2 (1912). Oil on canvas. 57 7/8" x 35 1/8". Philadelphia Museum of Art.

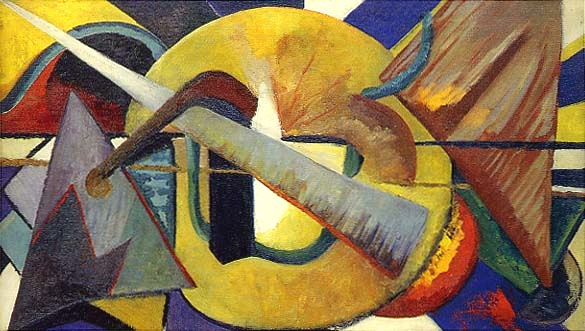
Katherine Sophie Dreier, Abstract Painting of Marcel Duchamp, 1918, Museum of Modern Art, New York

Dreier returned to London to marry Edward Trumball in August 1911, but was back in England by September, and her marriage was annulled. She had a solo exhibition the month of her return at Doré Galleries in London and another in Frankfurt, Germany in 1912, and while in Germany, she toured the country and studied under Gustaf Britsch. While there, she saw works by Modernists and became particularly interested in modern abstract painting.

Her first exhibit in the United States was at the MacBeth Gallery in New York. Dreier exhibited two oil paintings at the 1913 Armory Show, Blue Bowl and The Avenue, Holland. There she saw Marcel Duchamp's Nude Descending a Staircase, which was considered the "controversial centerpiece of the show." She was frustrated by the lack of respect given to the new, emerging artform. Wassily Kandinsky and Duchamp both influenced her work, which is realized in the Abstract Portrait of Marcel Duchamp that she made in 1918, and marked her transition to modern art.

Through art collector Walter Arensberg she met avant-garde artists from the United States and Europe when she was co-founder of the Society of Independent Artists in New York City. Duchamp was a central figure in the irreverent group and she became his patron, friend and partner. She exhibited two works in their First Annual Exhibition (April 10-May 6, 1917).

Dreier, Duchamp and Dadaist and Surrealist Man Ray founded the Société Anonyme in 1920 for "the study and promotion of modern art," including Cubism, Expressionism, Dadaism, Futurism, and Bauhaus art. She was a driving force of the organization — through her financial support and promotional efforts. The Société had its first exhibition on April 30, 1920, and thereafter it promoted artists through the lectures it held, exhibitions it organized, and publications it produced. It promoted the works of Paul Klee, Stanton Macdonald-Wright, Wassily Kandinsky, Heinrich Campendonk, Joan Miró, David Burliuk, Kazimir Malevich and Fernand Léger. The Société held the first permanent collection of modern art in the United States, (Note: The Museum of Modern Art was not founded until 1929.) 175 artists were represented in more than 800 works. Dreier was also member of the Abstraction-Création group. In 1926, she inaugurated the first major exhibition of modern art in American since the Armory Show, in the Brooklyn Museum from Friday, November 19, 1926, through Monday, January 10, 1927, three years before the Museum of Modern Art came into existence. She visited Piet Mondrian's studio in Paris and acquired one of his diamond composition Painting I for the exhibition.

Katherine Dreier deeply resented the upstart rival Museum of Modern Art, whose wealthy backers, she felt, had stolen her mission and her ideas and even her name—the Société Anonyme's subtitle was "Museum of Modern Art." In truth however, Dreier's tireless idealism could not make up for her lack of significant financial support. The Société Anonyme's exhibition rooms were too small, but Dreier's attempts to find larger quarters kept breaking down because the funds, which came mainly from her and her two sisters, were insufficient. Her society—as time went on it became more and more a one-woman operation—could and did claim precedence, nevertheless, as the first museum anywhere in the world that was devoted exclusively to modern art.

She wrote the book Western Art in the New Era about modern art, which was published in 1923 and reflected her viewpoint, inspired by Kandinsky, that saw "form as the outward expression of inner spiritual meaning." In 1930 and 1931 she lectured at the New School for Social Research and the Rand School. In 1933 a retrospective of her works was held at the Academy of Allied Arts in New York and that year her book, Shawn the Dancer, about her friend and dancer Ted Shawn was published. The show "40 Variations", a 1935 exhibit of music-inspired abstract paintings, included her work.

She supported fellow artists, including helping with publicity and by becoming their patron.

=== The Cooperative Mural Workshop, The Society of Independent Artists, and The Société Anonyme ===
Dreier created the Cooperative Mural Workshop in 1914 following the derisive response to the Armory Show. She described the workshop as something that "United art and artisanship and brought about usefulness and beauty." The collective was short-lived, however in their time they painted murals, organized exhibitions, and offered workshops. In 1916 Dreier helped found the Society of Independent Artists where she met Marcel Duchamp with whom she had a lifelong friendship. Duchamp resigned, much to Dreier's dismay, as director of the organization after they refused to exhibit Fountain. Following this, in 1920, Dreier, Duchamp, and Man Ray founded the Société Anonyme. With regards to the name, she stated "Since our desire was to promote art and not our own personalities, Man Ray conceived the amusing title of calling it the Société Anonyme, which is the French for 'incorporated', and as we incorporated, we became Incorporated Incorporated." The society sponsored lectures, concerts, publications, and exhibitions of modern art. Duchamp and Dreier presented the Société Anonyme's art collection to Yale University in 1941. She gave a Trowbridge Lecture (Note: Colonel Rutherford Trowbridge provided an endowment to Yale University in 1899 to fund annual lectures for the Yale Art School.) on the "Intrinsic Significance of Modern Art" in 1948 at Yale University. In 1950 Duchamp and Dreier published a catalog of the Société Anonyme's works donated to Yale. The organization ended on its 30th anniversary in 1950, when the three founders formally dissolved it.

== Later years and death ==
Dreier's health began to decline, having a "crippling illness", about 1942, but she continued to work, giving lectures and writing. She died on March 29, 1952, in Milford Connecticut as the result of cirrhosis of the liver, which was not due to an alcohol issue.

== Legacy ==
Modern art has known no other so fervent a propagandist.

— Aline Saarinen, art critic

Dreier's major achievement lay neither in her writings nor in her painting, however, but in her early recognition and championship of such artists as Duchamp, and Kandinsky, as well as Klee, Gabo, Villion, Léger and Mondrian, and in her determined attempts to create both an institution and a climate of acceptance for their work.

— Eleanor S. Apter
