= Vahan Malezian =

Vahan Malezian Վահան Մալեզեան
- Born: 3 October 1871; Sulina, Romania
- Died: 4 May 1967 (aged 95); Nice, France
- Occupations: Poet, writer, translator, and political activist.

Vahan Malezian (Armenian: Վահան Մալեզեան, 3 October [O.S. 21 September] 1871 in Sulina, Romania - 4 May 1967 in Nice, France) was an Armenian writer, translator, poet, and social activist.
