= Margaret Dreier Robins =

American labor leader and philanthropist

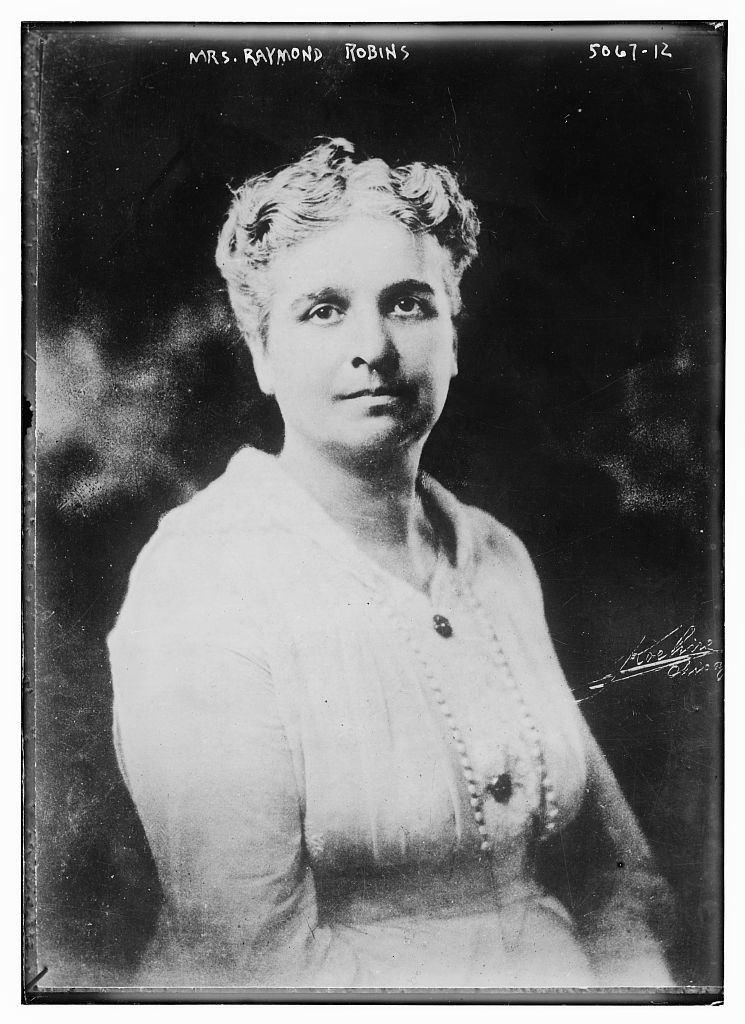
- Robins in 1919
- Born: Margaret Dreier; September 6, 1868; Brooklyn, New York, U.S.
- Died: February 21, 1945 (aged 76)
- Occupations: Labor leader, philanthropist
- Known for: Women's Trade Union League; Woman’s Municipal League
- Relatives: Mary Dreier (sister); Dorothea A. Dreier (sister); Katherine Sophie Dreier (sister)

Margaret Dreier Robins (6 September 1868 – 21 February 1945) was an American labor leader and philanthropist.

== Early life ==
She was born in Brooklyn, New York on September 6, 1868. Her parents, Theodor Dreier, a successful businessman, and Dorthea Dreier, were both immigrants from Germany. Her mother's maiden name was Dreier and her parents were cousins from Bremen, Germany. Their ancestors were civic leaders and merchants. Theodor came to the United States in 1849 and became partner of the English iron firm of Naylor, Benson and Company's New York branch. He married Dorothea in 1864 during a visit to Bremen and brought her back with him to the United States and they lived in a brownstone house in Brooklyn Heights, New York.

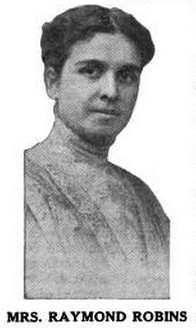
Margaret Dreier Robins, LaFollette's Magazine, January 1, 1911.

Margaret Dreier had a brother and three sisters. Her sister Mary was a social reformer. Her sisters Dorothea and Katherine were painters.

She was privately educated because her parents believed that the study of the arts was too often neglected in traditional education. In her teens, Robins suffered from physical ailments which left her depressed and weak.

== Social reform career ==
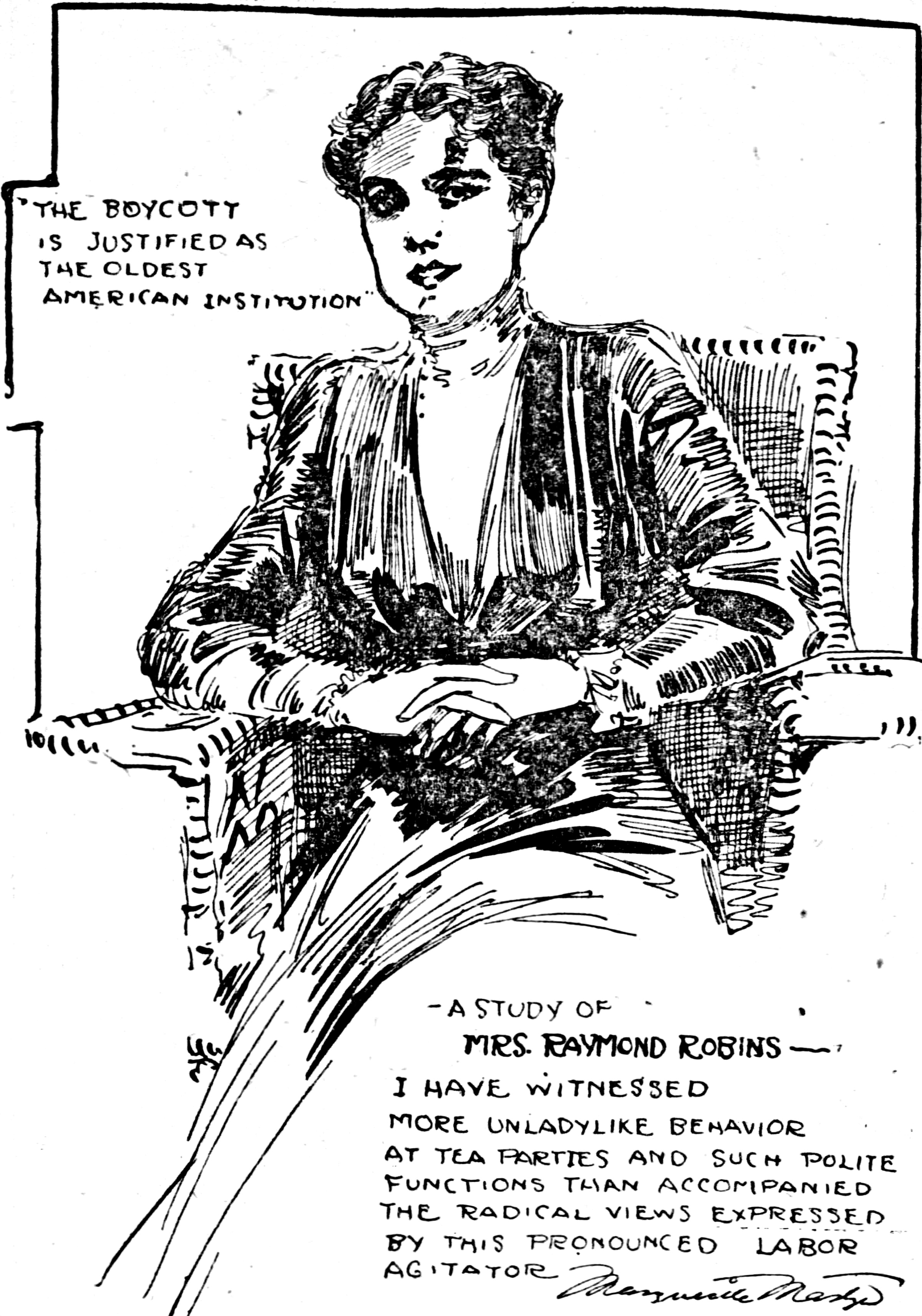
Sketch by journalist Marguerite Martyn, with her reaction to the interview, 1910

At age nineteen, she began doing charity work at Brooklyn Hospital and soon became involved in other progressive causes. She met the reformer Josephine Shaw Lowell in 1902, and through Lowell joined in the Woman’s Municipal League, an organization that helped women avoid prostitution. Another collaborator was Frances Kellor, with whom she founded the New York Association for Household Research which provided lodging and placement for women domestic workers.

In 1904, increasingly interested in workers’ rights, Dreier joined the Women's Trade Union League, then only a small, budding organization. She became the president of its New York chapter in 1905; president of the Chicago chapter 1907-1914; and treasurer of the national organization and rose quickly in its ranks. In 1907, she was elected president of the national organization and began a fifteen-year tenure as its leader. Meanwhile, she married the lawyer and social worker Raymond Robins in 1905. The newlyweds split their time between running a settlement house in Chicago, Illinois and Chinsegut Hill in Brooksville, Florida.

As president of the League, Robins helped organize women into unions, educate women workers, and advocate for progressive legislation. She created a Training School for Women to educate women workers about organizing and leadership skills. She supported and became active in a number of well publicized strikes, most notably the International Ladies Garment Workers’ strike in 1910. She pushed for protective legislation limiting the hours of women’s work, and she presided over the League during its most influential period. She served on the executive board of the Chicago Federation of Labor after 1908, and in 1915 was appointed to the unemployment commission by the governor of Illinois.

Active in the Women's Suffrage Movement, Raymond Robins ran for office in 1912 as a Progressive Party candidate for Trustee at the University of Illinois. He earned over 300,000 votes but did not win a seat.

In 1919, Robins played an important role in the creation of the first International Congress of Working Women. Robins agreed to send both Rose Schneiderman and Mary Anderson to the Paris Peace Conference, where with other female labor leaders they organized an international labor women’s conference to prepare for the upcoming International Labour Organization convention in October in Washington, D.C.

In 1924, Robins retired from her activist work and moved full-time with her husband to Florida. She continued her philanthropic work there, helping found the YWCA and the first library and supporting local arts productions. She died in 1945, aged 76.

== Sources ==
- Payne, Elizabeth Anne (1988). Reform, Labor, and Feminism: Margaret Dreier Robins and the Women's Trade Union League. Chicago: University of Illinois Press. ISBN 9780252014451.
- Rines, George Edwin, ed. (1920). "Robins, Margaret Dreier" . Encyclopedia Americana.
