= Dorothea A. Dreier =

American artist

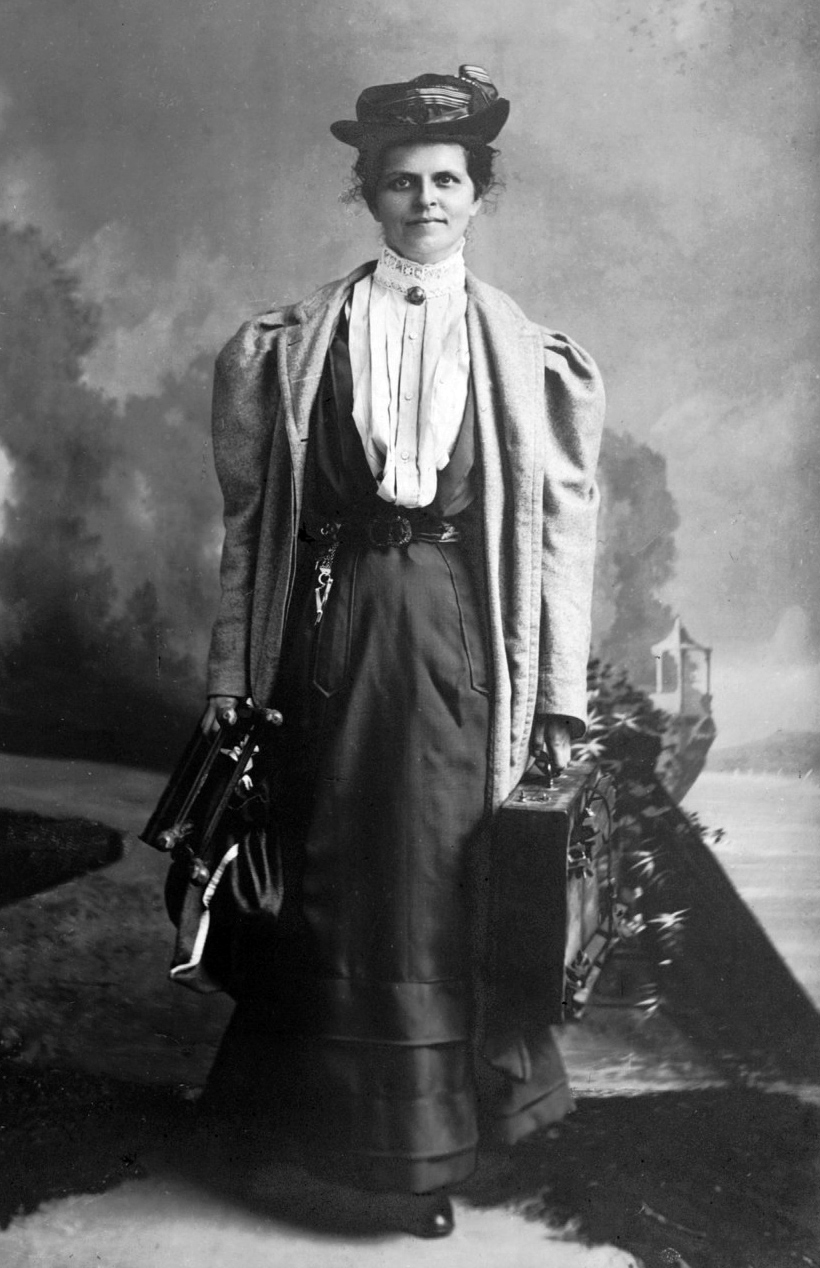
- Portrait of Dreier with easel and painting equipment, c. 1900
- Born: December 8, 1870; Brooklyn, New York, US
- Died: September 14, 1923 (aged 52); Saranac, New York, U.S.
- Resting place: Green-Wood Cemetery
- Known for: Painting
- Movement: Post-Impressionism

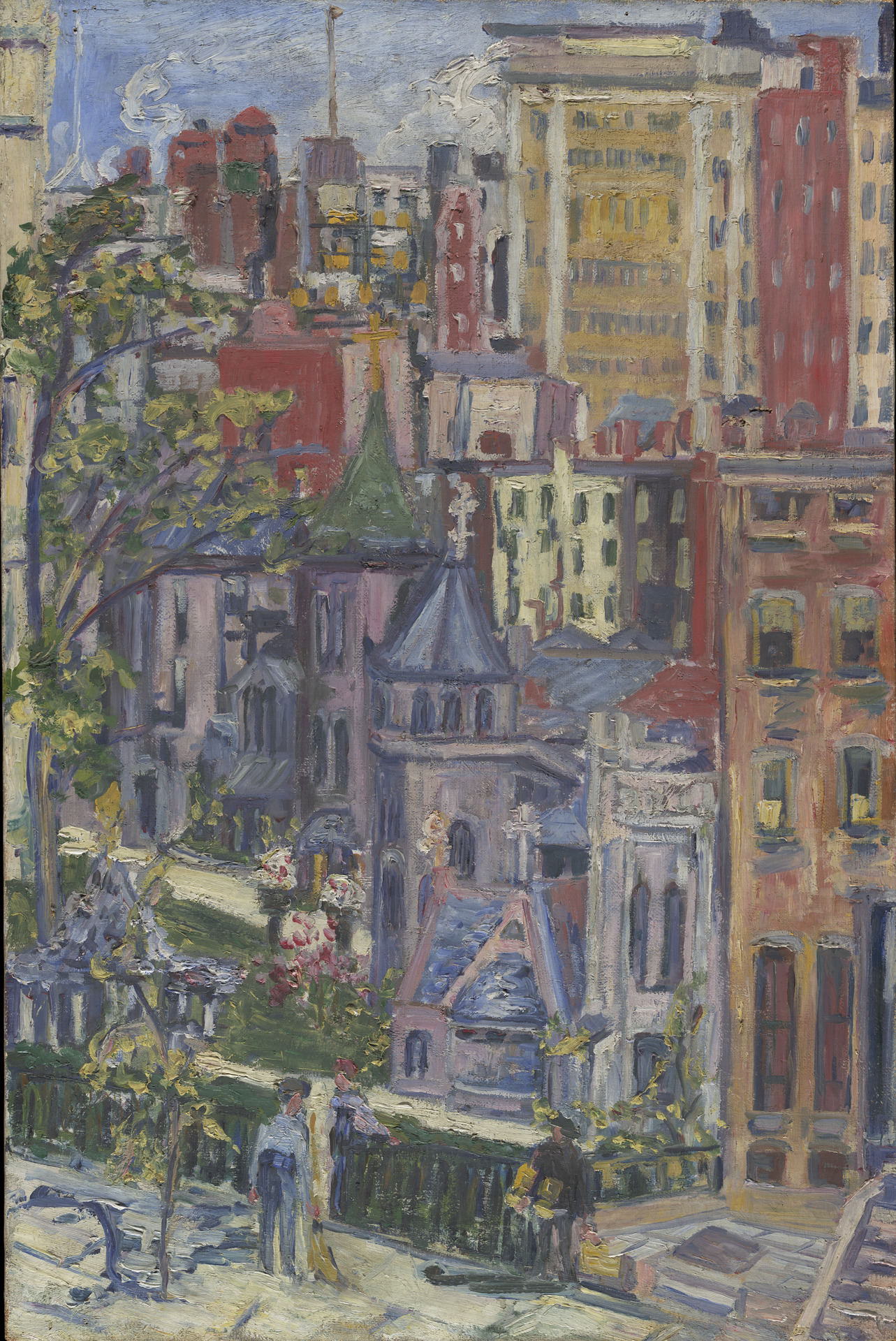
New York, The Little Church around the Corner, 1920

Dorothea Adelheid Dreier (1870–1923) was an American Post-Impressionist painter.

== Biography ==
Dreier was born in Brooklyn, New York, on December 8, 1870, to German immigrants Dorothea Adelheid and John Caspar Theodor Dreier. Her five siblings included the painter Katherine S. Dreier, social reformer Mary Dreier, and the labor leader Margaret Dreier Robins. The family embraced their German heritage and frequently travel to Europe. Dorothea studied at the Art Students League of New York in New York City under John Twachtman, William Merritt Chase, and Walter Shirlaw. She was a member of the Society of Independent Artists.

During her life Dreier exhibited at the New York Water Color Society, Société Anonyme, Museum of Modern Art, the Society of Independent Artists, the Art Institute of Chicago, and Doré Galleries.

She died from tuberculosis on September 14, 1923 in Saranac, New York. A posthumous retrospective of her work was held at the Brooklyn Museum in 1925.

Dreier's work is in the collections of the Brooklyn Museum, Wadsworth Atheneum, Yale University Art Gallery, and the George Walter Vincent Smith Art Museum. Her papers are in the Archives of American Art at the Smithsonian Institution.
