= Sulina =

- Town
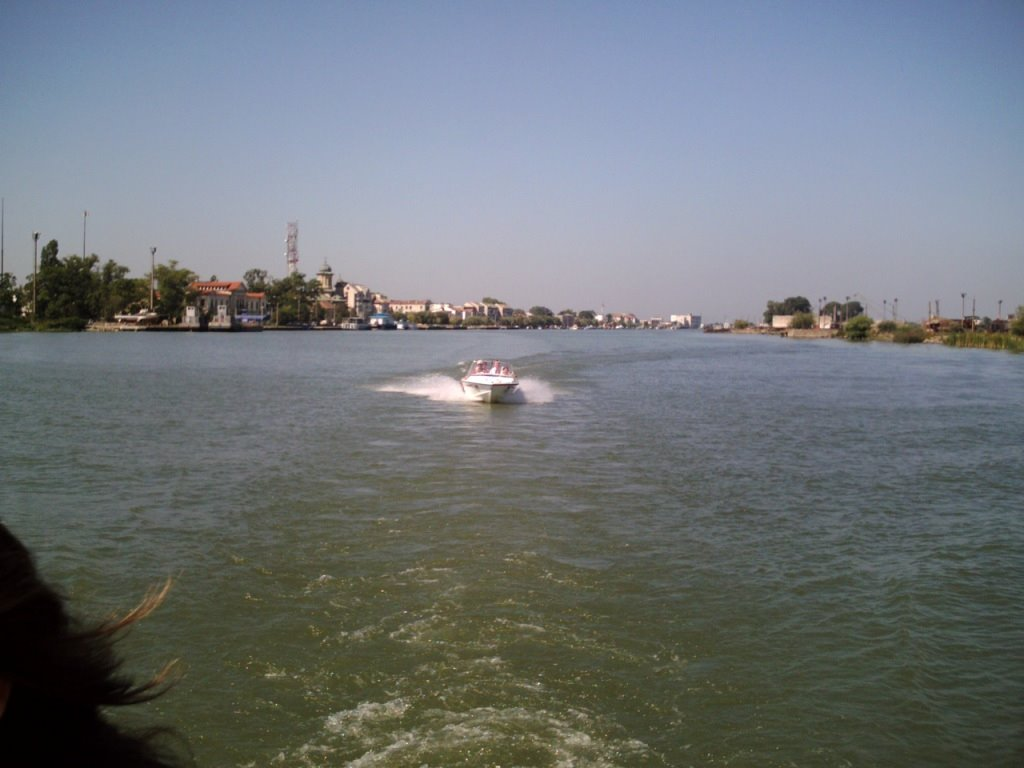

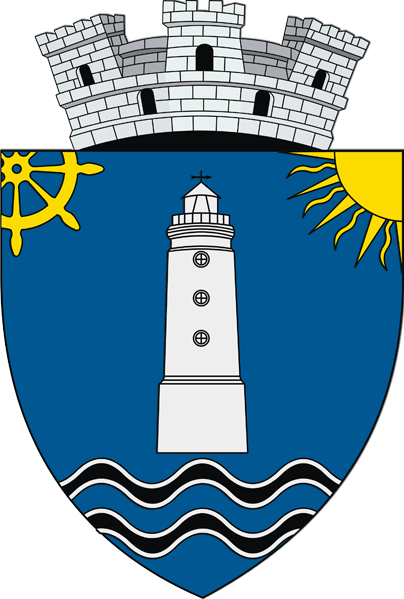
- Coat of arms

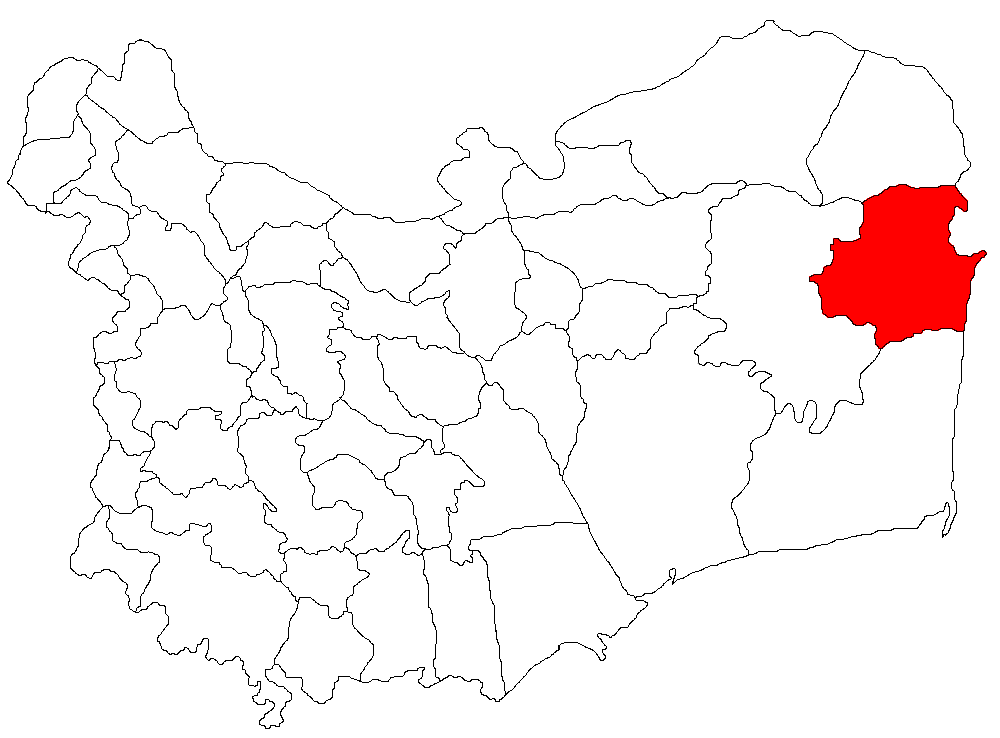
- Location in Tulcea County

- Location in Romania
- Coordinates: 45°9′34″N 29°39′10″E
- Country: Romania
- County: Tulcea

Government
  - Mayor (2024–2028): Maria Bălan (PSD)
- Area: 329.56 km^{2} (127.24 sq mi)
- Elevation: 4 m (13 ft)
- Population (2021-12-01): 3,118
  - Density: 9.461/km^{2} (24.50/sq mi)
- Time zone: UTC+02:00 (EET)
  - Summer (DST): UTC+03:00 (EEST)
- Postal code: 825400
- Area code: (+40) 02 40
- Vehicle reg.: TL
- Website: www.primaria-sulina.ro

Sulina (Romanian pronunciation: [suˈlina]) is a town and free port in Tulcea County, Northern Dobruja, Romania, at the mouth of the Sulina branch of the Danube. It is the easternmost point of Romania.

== History ==
During the mid-Byzantine period, Sulina was a small cove, and in the 14th century, a Genoese port inhabited by a handful of sailors, pirates and fishermen. In the 18th century, the Ottomans built a lighthouse there in order to facilitate communication between Constantinople (Istanbul) and the Danubian Principalities, the main breadbaskets for the Ottoman capital.

Thanks to the signing of the Treaty of Adrianoupolis (Edirne) on September 2, 1829, that unfettered the Danube grain trade, Sulina, by then under Russian control, became an important port. Great sailing boats could not sail fully loaded to Brăila and Galați, which were the main export centers of Wallachia and Moldavia, because of the shallow waters of the river; therefore, they had to transship at least part of their cargoes to smaller riverboats (shleps). The owners and crew of these shleps were almost always Greek.

Even greater development occurred after the signing of the Treaty of Paris (1856), which ended the Crimean War. One of the treaty's terms determined the establishment of the European Commission of the Danube (CED), which would conduct infrastructure works on the mouth of the river in order to make it navigable for larger ships as well. The technical works allowed entrance to the Danube for a great number of "foreign", i.e. non-Greek ships, leading to a higher level of competition. River trading, however, largely remained in Greek hands. The declaration by the Ottoman administration of Sulina as a free port in 1870 also boosted its development.

The Russo-Ottoman war of 1877–1878 led to many changes as well. The city was initially put under Russian control and after the signing of the Berlin Treaty was annexed to Romania, as was the whole Dobruja area. According to an 1878 estimate, the town then had a total population of 800, consisting of 350 Greeks, 150 Turks, 50 Romanians, 50 Russian Old Believers and 200 others. During World War I the city served as base for the Romanian cruiser Elisabeta, whose actions kept the Danube Delta under Romanian control throughout the war.

In November 1916, the German submarine UC-15 was sent on a minelaying mission off Sulina and never returned, being sunk by her own mines. This was probably caused by an encounter with the Romanian torpedo boat Smeul, whose captain surprised a German submarine near Sulina in November 1916, the latter reportedly never returning to her base at Varna. This could only have been UC-15, whose systems most likely malfunctioned after being forced to submerge in the shallow waters, upon encountering the Romanian torpedo boat.

In World War II, the Soviet M-class submarine M-59 was sunk by mines laid off Sulina by the Romanian minelayers Amiral Murgescu, Regele Carol I and Dacia.

== Climate ==
Sulina has a cold semi-arid climate (Köppen climate classification: BSk).

Climate data for Sulina (1991−2020 normals, extremes 1961−2020)
Month	Jan	Feb	Mar	Apr	May	Jun	Jul	Aug	Sep	Oct	Nov	Dec	Year
Record high °C (°F)	16.2 (61.2)	17.9 (64.2)	24.5 (76.1)	26.1 (79.0)	29.3 (84.7)	33.8 (92.8)	35.7 (96.3)	37.5 (99.5)	32.6 (90.7)	26.5 (79.7)	22.2 (72.0)	17.5 (63.5)	37.5 (99.5)
Mean daily maximum °C (°F)	3.5 (38.3)	4.3 (39.7)	7.7 (45.9)	12.8 (55.0)	19.1 (66.4)	24.1 (75.4)	26.7 (80.1)	26.5 (79.7)	21.7 (71.1)	16.1 (61.0)	10.5 (50.9)	5.6 (42.1)	14.9 (58.8)
Daily mean °C (°F)	0.9 (33.6)	1.8 (35.2)	5.1 (41.2)	10.4 (50.7)	16.5 (61.7)	21.2 (70.2)	23.6 (74.5)	23.5 (74.3)	18.9 (66.0)	13.6 (56.5)	8.2 (46.8)	3.1 (37.6)	12.2 (54.0)
Mean daily minimum °C (°F)	−1.3 (29.7)	−0.3 (31.5)	3.3 (37.9)	8.6 (47.5)	14.5 (58.1)	18.8 (65.8)	20.9 (69.6)	20.9 (69.6)	16.4 (61.5)	11.5 (52.7)	6.0 (42.8)	0.9 (33.6)	10.0 (50.0)
Record low °C (°F)	−17.7 (0.1)	−17.8 (0.0)	−15.6 (3.9)	−0.7 (30.7)	4.4 (39.9)	9.3 (48.7)	12.1 (53.8)	10.5 (50.9)	4.4 (39.9)	−1.0 (30.2)	−8.0 (17.6)	−11.5 (11.3)	−17.8 (0.0)
Average precipitation mm (inches)	16.0 (0.63)	11.9 (0.47)	17.4 (0.69)	14.0 (0.55)	20.3 (0.80)	28.3 (1.11)	18.9 (0.74)	23.5 (0.93)	21.5 (0.85)	24.3 (0.96)	22.7 (0.89)	21.7 (0.85)	240.5 (9.47)
Average precipitation days (≥ 1.0 mm)	3.6	3.3	4.0	3.8	4.0	3.7	2.7	2.3	3.2	3.5	3.8	4.7	42.6
Average relative humidity (%)	84	82	80	77	76	73	72	74	76	79	83	84	78
Average dew point °C (°F)	−1.6 (29.1)	−1.2 (29.8)	1.7 (35.1)	7.0 (44.6)	12.3 (54.1)	16.2 (61.2)	18.0 (64.4)	17.8 (64.0)	14.7 (58.5)	10.0 (50.0)	5.3 (41.5)	1.4 (34.5)	8.5 (47.2)
Mean monthly sunshine hours	75.9	103.1	148.3	204.2	278.9	305.1	334.7	308.5	229.7	159.8	90.0	73.4	2,311.6
Source 1: NOAA (dew point 1961–1990)
Source 2: Danish Meteorological Institute (humidity, 1931–1960)

== Demographics ==
Historical population
Year	Pop.	±%
1900	5,612	—
1912	7,347	+30.9%
1930	6,399	−12.9%
1948	3,373	−47.3%
1956	3,622	+7.4%
1966	4,005	+10.6%
1977	4,911	+22.6%
1992	5,484	+11.7%
2002	5,140	−6.3%
2011	3,663	−28.7%
2021	3,118	−14.9%
Source: Census data

According to the 2021 census, the town has 3,118 inhabitants. At the 2011 census, 82.82% of the population were Romanians, 11.43% Lipovans, 1.8% Greeks, 1.29% Ukrainians, and 2.3% of other or undeclared ethnicity. At the 2002 census, 93.0% spoke Romanian and 5.7% Russian as their first language. 94.3% were Orthodox, and 5.1% Old Believers.

At the 1930 census, 47.2% were Romanians, 20.8% Greeks, 17.7% Lipovans, 3.3% Serbs, 3.0% Turks, 1.6% Jews, 1.0% Germans, and 5.4% others.

== Notable people ==
- Romulus Bărbulescu (1925–2010), science-fiction writer
- Manya Botez (1896–1971), pianist and children's music teacher
- George Georgescu (1887–1964), conductor
- Vahan Malezian (1871–1966), writer, translator, poet, and social activist
- John R. Palandech (1873–1959), entrepreneur, publisher and politician
- Ionel Petrov (born 1934), rower
- Ștefan Tarasov (born 1943), rower

== Sightseeing ==
- Lighthouse of the European Commission of the Danube
- Cathedral of Sf. Alexandru and Sf. Nicolae
- Cemetery of the European Danube Commission

The waters of the Danube, which flow into the Black Sea, form the largest and best preserved of Europe's river deltas. The Danube Delta hosts over 300 species of birds as well as 45 freshwater fish species in its numerous lakes and marshes.

== Gallery ==
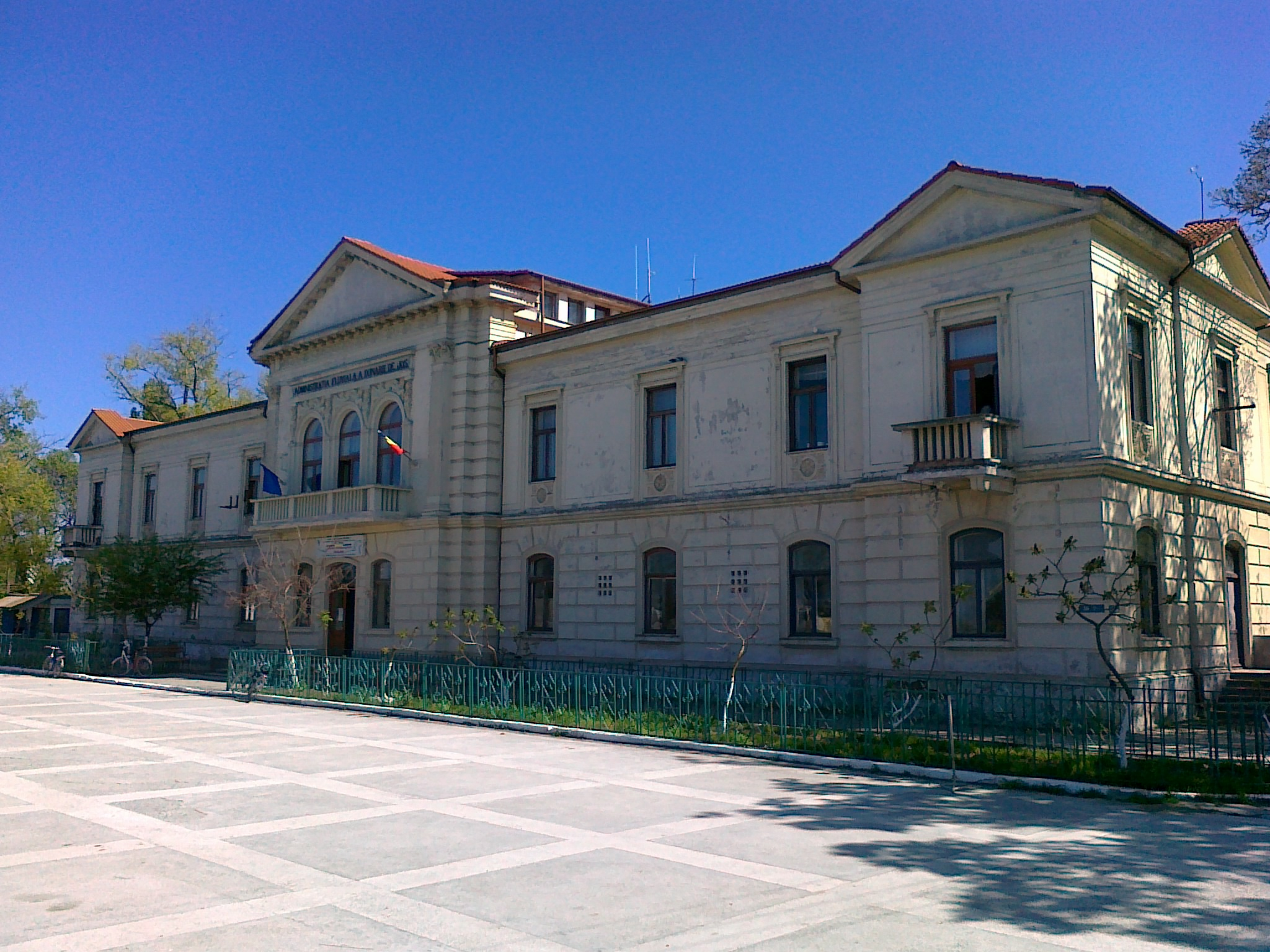
The Palace of the Danube Commission

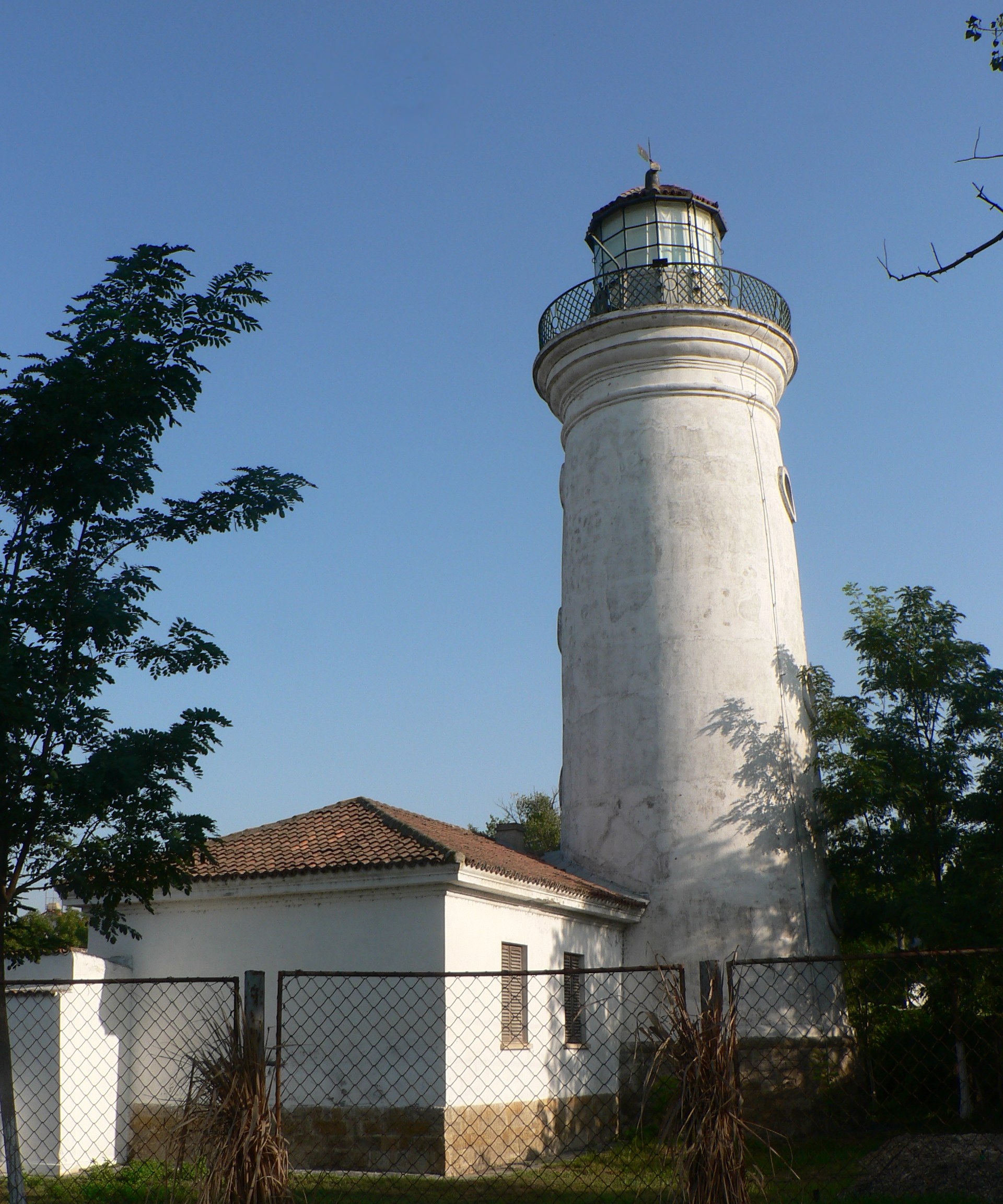
The Lighthouse

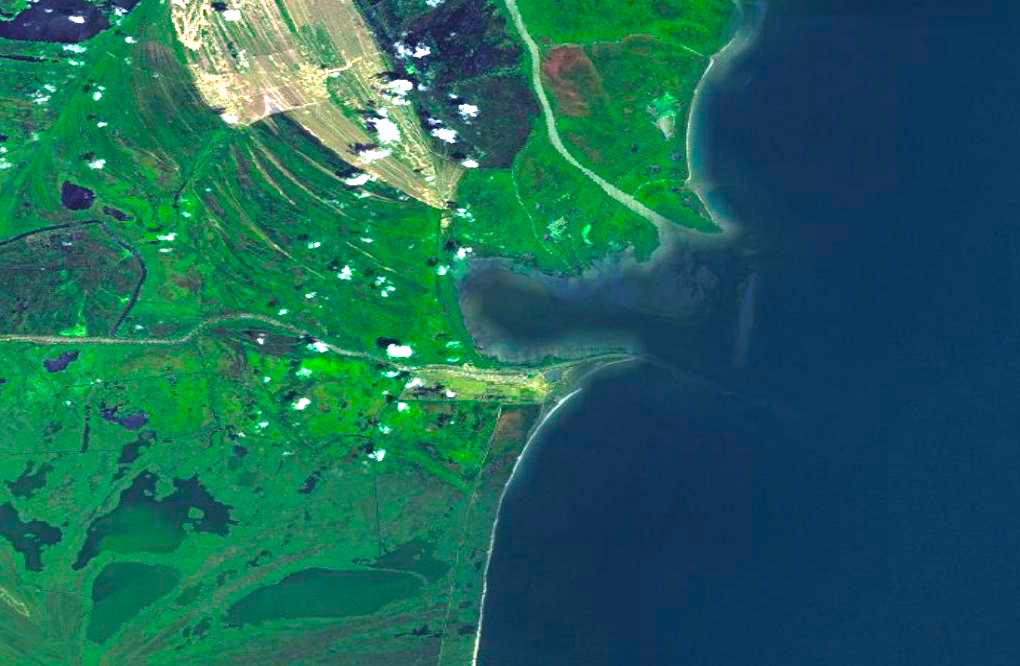
Sulina from space (2011)

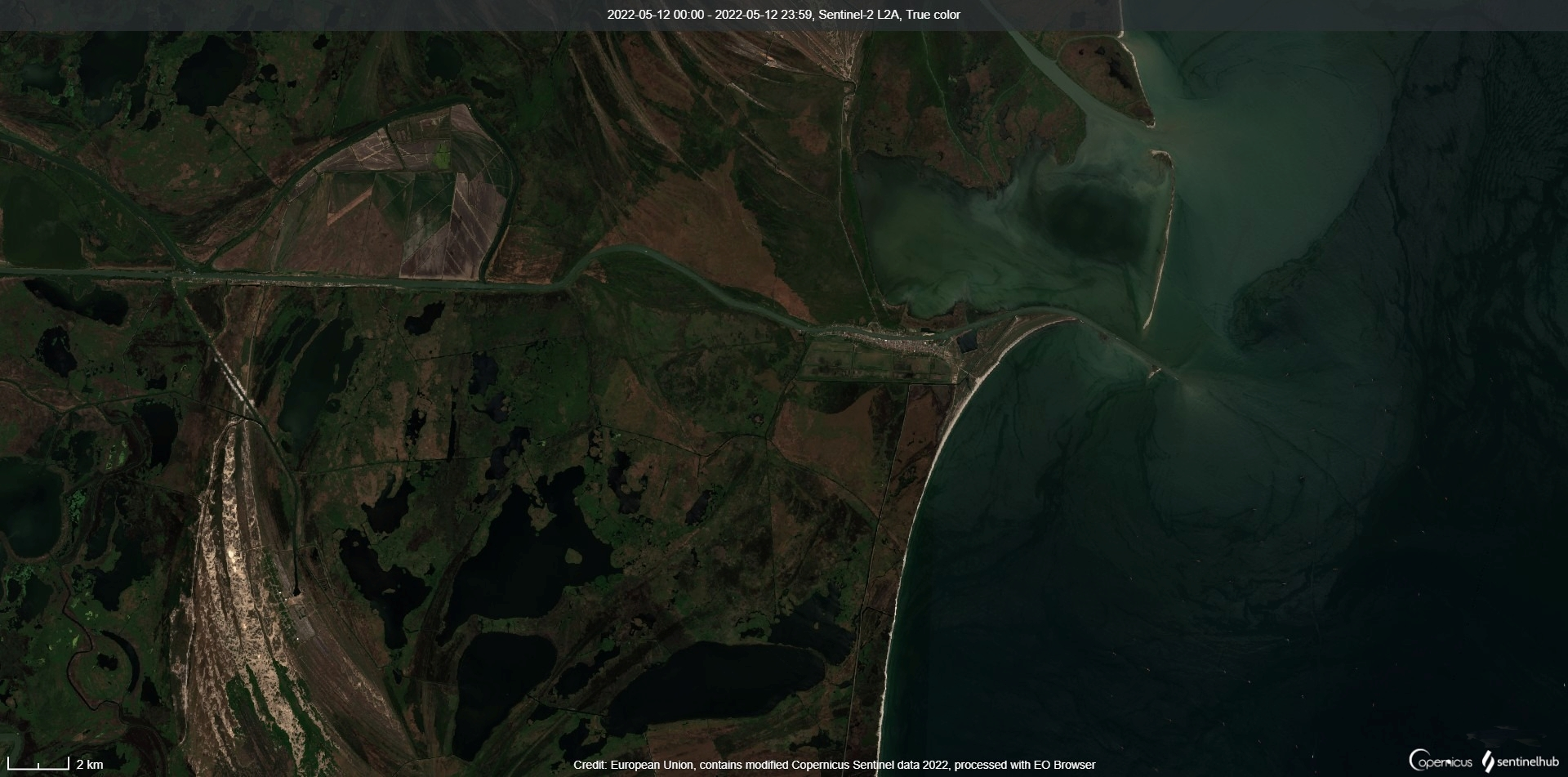
Sulina from space (2022)

== Bibliography ==
- Constantin Ardeleanu, International Trade and Diplomacy at the Lower Danube: The Sulina Question and the Economic Premises of the Crimean War (1829-185), Editura Istros, 2014.
