= Gustaf Britsch =

Gustaf Adolf Britsch (11 August 1879 – 27 October 1923) was an early 20th-century German art theorist and the founder of Gustaf Britsch Institute in Starnberg, Germany.

== Life ==
Gustaf Britsch was born into a middle-class Swabian family of teachers. He left his family early. He first studied architecture at the University of Stuttgart and worked as an architect in Stuttgart. Then he enrolled in 1906 at the Munich School of Philosophy and studied with Hans Cornelius and Theodor Lipps. He created theories to the understanding of art by early 1907, which were received by Adolf von Hildebrand and Konrad Fiedler. In 1909, he founded in Florence the "Institute of Theoretical and Applied Art Studies". In 1910, he was encouraged by Cornelius to publish his theories. He moved back to Munich in 1911 and in 1912 opened the Institute of Theoretical and Applied Arts Science again on Theresa Street in Schwabing. In 1913, he spoke at the Congress of Aesthetics and General Art Studies in Berlin. Together with his student Egon Kornmann he represented a highly regarded school of thought about children's artistic development, which found its way into art education programs in Germany. These theories were also contradictory to others, such as Richard Mund.

After Britschs' death, Kornmannn continued the Gustaf Britsch Institute in Starnberg. He also married Britschs' widow Louise, and clarified with her Britschs' designs and theories. So the Starnberger Kornmann-Britsch-circle (also Britsch-Kormann School) was founded, which employed art teacher Hans Herrmann. Kornmann was editor in the 1930s of the magazine The Shape.

== Gustaf Britsch Institute ==
The Gustaf Britsch Institute for Art Research (also known as: Institute of Theoretical and Applied Arts Science; School of Fine Arts Starnberg; private art school Britsch-Kornmann; Gustaf Britsch Institute for comparative viewing art) existed from 1912 in Munich and then from about 1920 to about 1967 in a fashionable villa on Prinzenweg 13 in Starnberg, headed by Egon and Louise Kornmann. (Note: By 1940, the Kornmann's housed there for a few months friend and artist Clara Harnack from Jena, until they were ensured she was safe from the Gestapo. For New Year's 1942 they had Mildred and Arvid Harnack and Lilo Ramdohr as guests.)

Numerous international artists and art teachers were trained and employed for decades, such as:

- 1912–1915 Arnold Clementschitsch
- 1920 Fritz von Graevenitz
- 1921/1925 Hermann Mayrhofer
- 1925 Martin Seitz (Schüler von Josef Wackerle)
- 1925–1929 Gerhard Gollwitzer
- 1926 Rudolf Conrad Erich Allwardt
- 1934 Irina Alexandrowna Borchman
- 1939 Richard Lackner
- 1943 Hans Grünseis

== Works ==
Britsch published art theoretical essays, which were created in part by Gustaf Britsch Institute Starnberg as teaching material:

- Gustaf Britsch: Theory of Fine Art (edited by Egon Kornmann), 1926
- Gustaf Britsch: Theory of Fine Arts. 4 Edition, Verlag Henn, Ratingen 1966

== Literature ==
- Otfried Contactor: Britsch and Kornmann. Quellenkundliche studies on the theory of the visual arts; Königshausen and Neumann. Würzburg, 1993. ISBN 3-88479-794-8.
- Gustaf Britsch: Fonts. Fragments on art theory in the early 20th Century. In 1981. ISBN 3-7861-1240-1.
- Egon Kornmann: Britsch, Gustav Adolf. In: New German Biography (NDB). Volume 2, Duncker & Humblot, Berlin 1955, ISBN 3-428-00183-4, p 618 (digitized).
