= Raymond Robins =

American economist and writer (1873–1954)

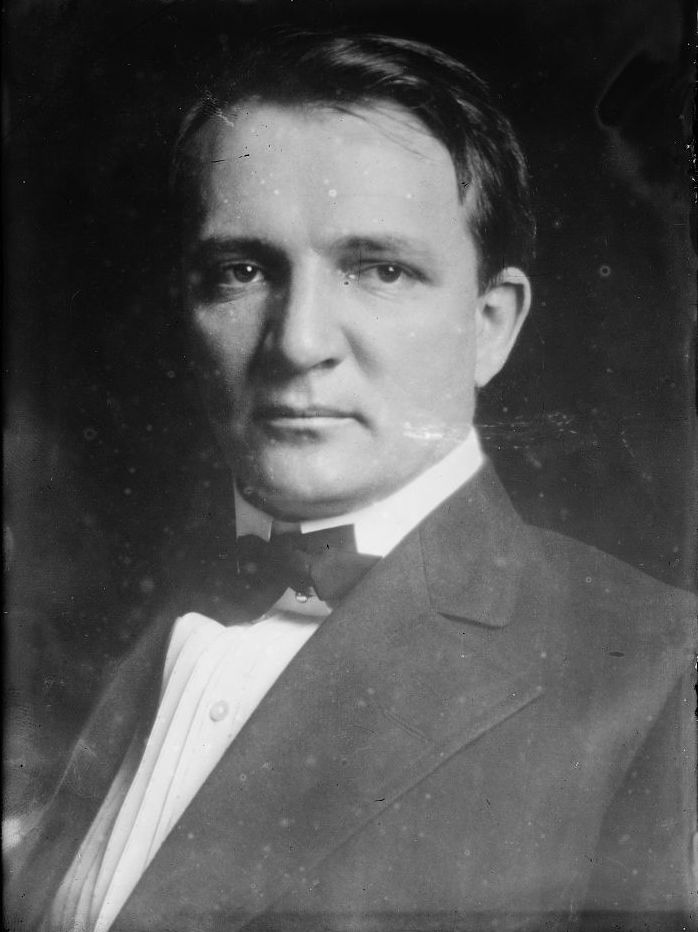
- Robins, c. 1910–1915
- Born: September 17, 1873; Staten Island, New York
- Died: September 26, 1954 (aged 81)
- Occupations: economist, writer
- Spouse: Margaret Dreier (married 1905)
- Relatives: Elizabeth Robins (sister)

Raymond Robins (17 September 1873 – 26 September 1954) was an American economist and writer. He was an advocate of organized labor and diplomatic relations between the United States and Russia under the Bolsheviks.

== Biography ==
He was born on 17 September 1873 in Staten Island, New York.

After financial troubles, his father left Robins and his siblings in the care of his mother and left to do mining in Colorado. When his mother went into a mental asylum, his upbringing was left to relatives. He was educated privately. In the early 1890s, he worked as a coal miner in Tennessee and Colorado. After a bad legal experience in a land deal, he studied law at George Washington University (then Columbian University) from where he graduated in 1896. He joined the Klondike gold rush in 1897, where he made some money, converted to Christianity, and became pastor for a Congregational church in Nome, Alaska. He moved to Chicago in 1900. He engaged in social work there 1902 to 1905, and was a member of the Chicago Board of Education from 1906 to 1909.

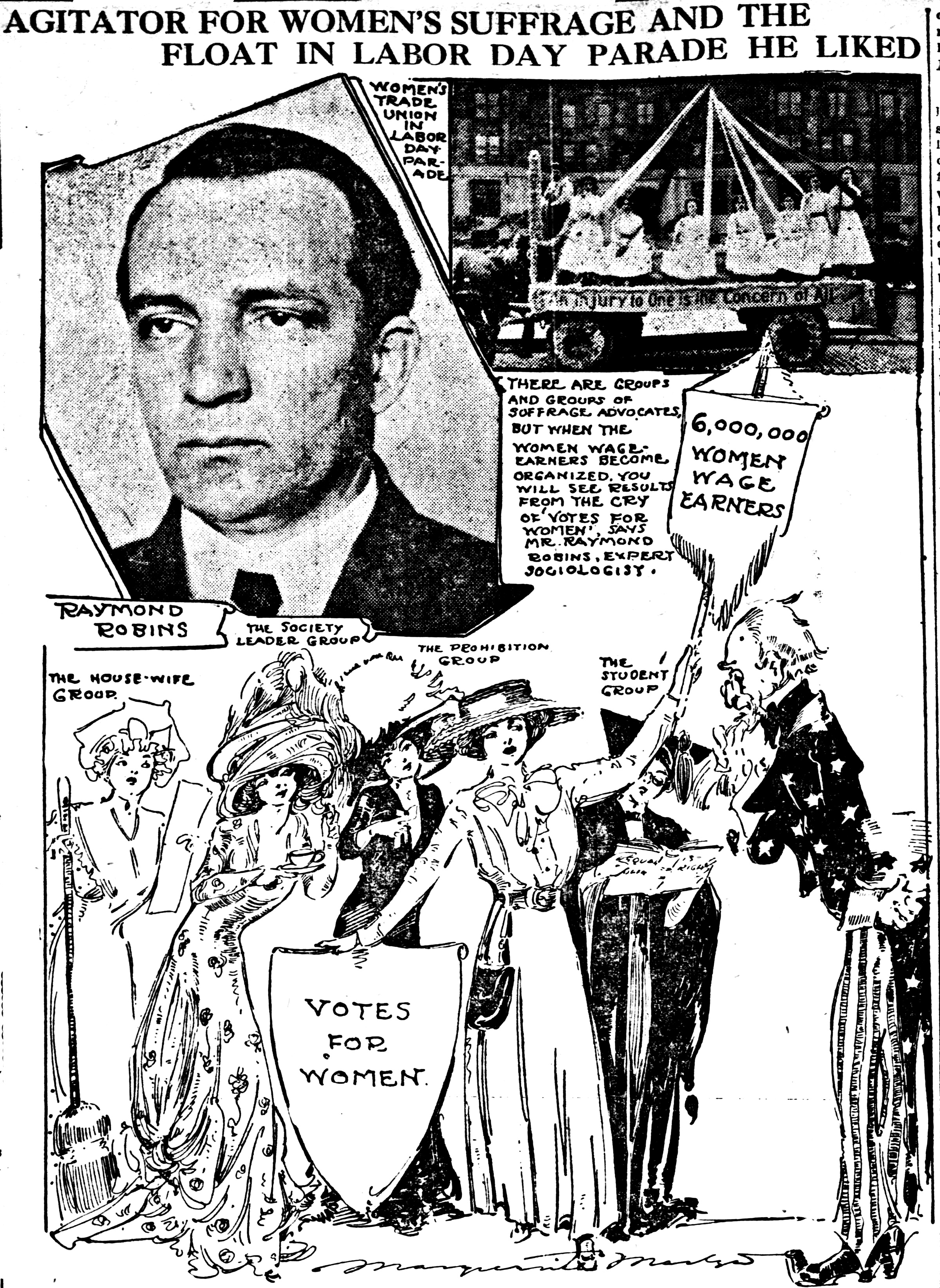
Layout in the September 10, 1909, issue of St. Louis Post-Dispatch features a photograph of Raymond Robins. At top right is a photo of a float in a Labor Day parade that week. At bottom, journalist Marguerite Martyn has drawn the figures of five women representing housewives, society leaders, prohibitionists, and students. One holds up a sign reading “6,000,000 women wage earners.” Uncle Sam looks on.

In 1905 Robins married Margaret Dreier, an independently wealthy labor activist who was president of the Women's Trade Union League.

In 1909, Robins attended a Labor Day parade in St. Louis, Missouri, after which he was interviewed by reporter and writer Marguerite Martyn. He told her that "there are groups and groups of suffrage advocates, but when the women wage-earners become organized, you will see results from the cry of 'Votes for Women.'"

Robins served also as social service expert for the Men and Religion Forward Movement, in 1911–12, and made a world tour in its interests in 1913. He was leader of the National Christian Social Evangelistic campaign in 1915.

He became identified with the Progressive Party and served as chairman of the State Central Committee. In 1914, he was candidate for United States Senator from Illinois for that party, and was temporary and permanent chairman of the Progressive National Convention in 1916.

During World War I, he was engaged in Y.M.C.A. work and Red Cross work in France. In 1917, he headed the expedition for the American Red Cross to Russia, and worked unsuccessfully at establishing diplomatic relations between the United States and Russia, but some years later, in 1933, did manage to persuade Franklin Roosevelt to exchange ambassadors. On his return from the 1917 expedition, he presented an elaborate report on conditions in Russia, which occasioned much discussion on account of the report's alleged leaning toward the Soviet movement. Although not philosophically sympathetic with the outcome of the Russian Revolution of 1917, he felt it was popular, and counter-revolutionary efforts were counter productive.

He died on 26 September 1954.

== Family ==
The actress and writer Elizabeth Robins was his sister. In 1905, he married United States labor leader Margaret Dreier Robins.

== Disappearance and amnesia ==
On 3 September 1932, Robins was traveling from the City Club in Manhattan to the White House, where he was supposed to meet with Herbert Hoover to discuss the urgent need for stronger enforcement of the Prohibition, a case Robins had been making over the past nine months on a 286-city tour. But Robins never showed up in the White House. After a two-month search, he was located in a boarding house in Whittier, North Carolina, under the name of Reynolds Rogers. Apparently because of his amnesia, he did not recognize his wife, Margaret, until she had visited three times.

== See also ==
- Chinsegut Hill Manor House

Party political offices
First after direct election of Senators was adopted in 1913	Progressive (Bull Moose) nominee for U.S. Senator from Illinois (Class 3); 1914	Party dissolved
