= American Association of Foreign Language Newspapers =

American newspaper association

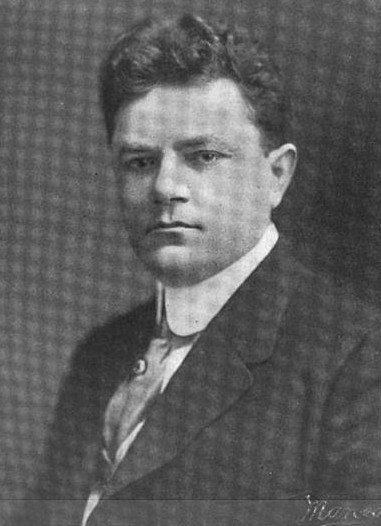
Portrait of founder Louis N. Hammerling, ca.1912

The American Association of Foreign Language Newspapers was founded by Louis Nicholas Hammerling in 1908. It served as an intermediary between "respectable national advertisers", and the foreign-language newspapers that profited from publishing advertisements. Frances Kellor led the effort after Hammerling's patriotism came under question ca.1918. Critics included Robert Ezra Park.
