= Mary Dreier =

American social reformer

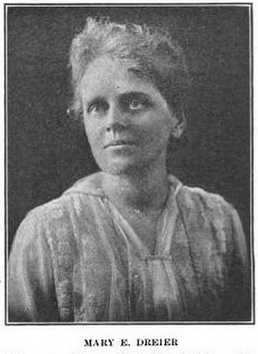
Mary E. Dreier, from a 1917 publication

Mary Dreier (September 26, 1875 - August 15, 1963) was an American social reformer in New York.

== Early life ==
Mary Elisabeth Dreier was born in New York City, New York, on September 26, 1875. Her parents, Theodor Dreier, a successful businessman, and Dorthea Dreier, were both immigrants from Germany. Her mother's maiden name was Dreier and her parents were cousins from Bremen, Germany, where their ancestors were civic leaders and merchants. Theodor came to the United States in 1849 and became partner at the New York branch of the English iron firm of Naylor, Benson and Company. He married Dorthea in 1864 during a visit to Bremen and brought her back with him to the United States, and they lived in a brownstone house in Brooklyn Heights, New York.

Mary had a brother and three sisters; her sister Margaret was also a labor reformer, while her sisters Dorothea and Katherine were painters.

Mary was educated by private tutors for the early part of her life, and later took courses at the New York School of Philanthropy. Her initial financial support came in the form of a trust fund left by her father. She and her sister Margaret worked hand-in-hand throughout her career.

== Personal life ==
She shared a home with fellow reformer and lifelong romantic partner Frances Kellor from 1905 until the latter's death in 1952. The two were part of a network of lesbian reformers. She lived alone for the rest of her life until dying of a pulmonary embolism on August 15, 1963, at her summer home in Bar Harbor, Maine. She and her partner Frances Kellor are buried together at Green-Wood Cemetery, Brooklyn, New York. Mary Elisabeth Dreier represents the involved philanthropist of the early twentieth century. From a financially secure family, she constantly contributed time, funds, and organizing talents to a variety of feminist causes, most notably women workers and the suffrage movement. Her social prominence and social commitments led to her service on local and regional boards and commissions, particularly those dealing with labor and with penal reform.

== Career ==
It was her strong religious background that motivated Dreier to take up religious reform. She focused on working women, women suffrage, and social and civic improvement.

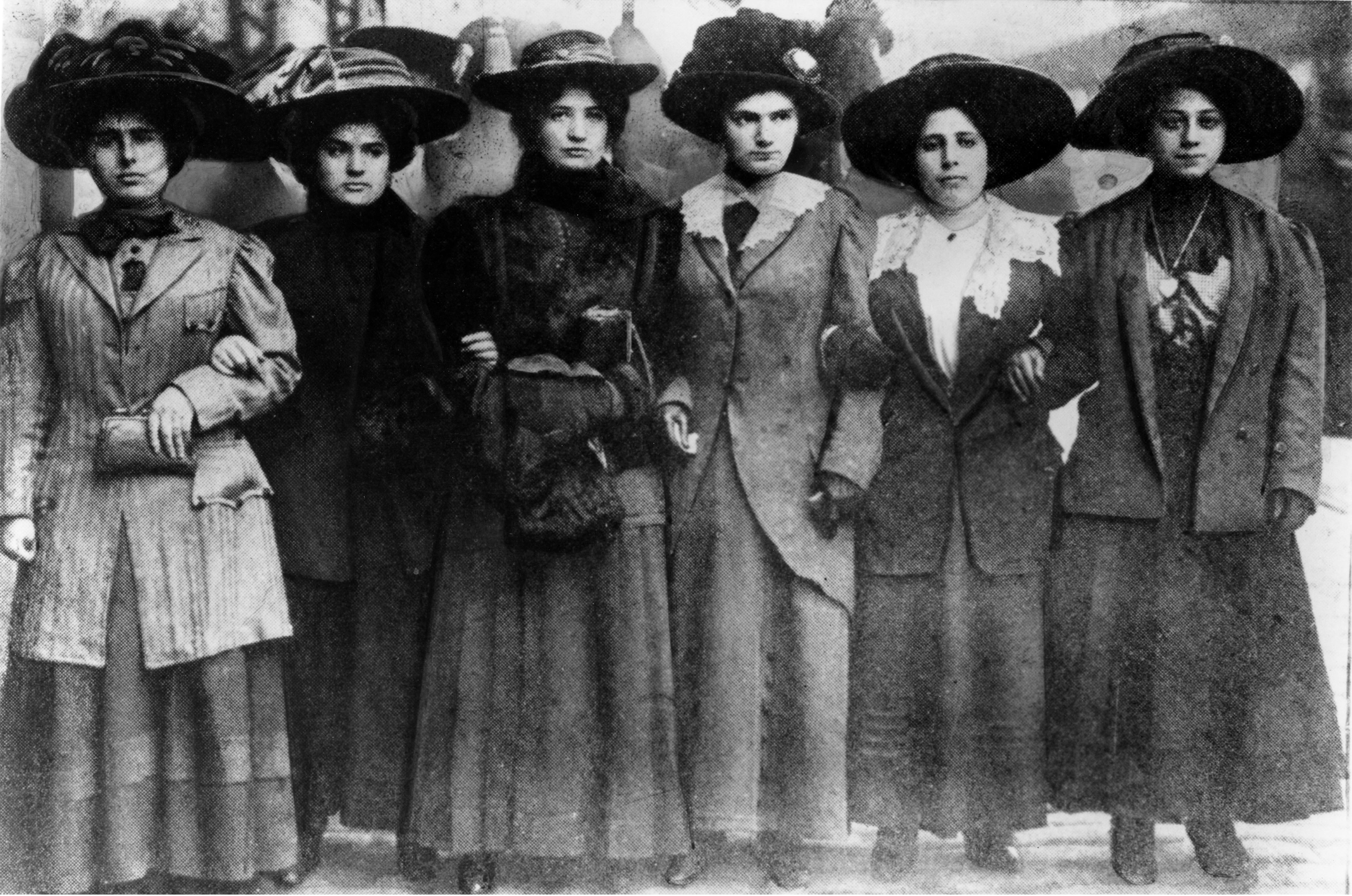
Six women including Mary Dreier, Ida Rauh, Helen Marot, Rena Borky, Yetta Raff, and Mary Effers link arms as they march to City Hall on December 3, 1909, during the New York shirtwaist strike to demand an end to abuse by police.

In 1899, she met Leonora O’Reilly, who was a former garment worker and head of a local settlement house at the time. Leonora was the one to connect Mary and her sister Margaret with the settlement house. They joined the New York Women's Trade Union League (NYWTUL), a coalition of female workers and middle- and upper-class women reformers founded in 1903 to organize working women and educate the public about urban labor conditions. Dreier served as president of the NYWTUL from 1906 to 1914, as acting president in 1935, and remained active until it disbanded in 1950. During a 1909 strike of shirtwaist-makers, she was arrested during a demonstration. However, after that she became a leading spokeswoman for labor reform for women workers. During her presidency, the New York group was particularly active among garment workers, supporting their organization in the International Ladies’ Garment Workers’ Union and assisting them in strike activities.

From 1911 to 1915, she served on the New York State Factory Investigating Commission, which provided evidence for the passage of factory reform legislation. She also wrote articles for the WTUL’S journal, Life and Labor, to encourage unionization. In 1915, Mayor John Mitchell appointed her to the New York City Board of Education, but she resigned all posts in 1915 in order to participate completely in the final drive to achieve the vote for women.

In 1917, Dreier became chairwoman of the New York State Committee on Women in Industry of the Advisory Commission of the Council of National Defense. After the war she was a member of the executive committee of the New York Council for Limitation of Armaments (1921-1927) and headed the Committee for the Outlawry of War of the WTUL.

Dreier became an ardent supporter of suffrage and women's rights and chaired New York City's Woman Suffrage Party due to the negative attitude of the male trade unionists towards women workers. On the national level she often supported Progressive Party nominees, including Robert M. La Follette and Henry A. Wallace, and she later became an enthusiastic backer of Franklin D. Roosevelt and the New Deal.

Dreier served on several government and private committees concerned with labor and women. Later in her career, she devoted more of her attention to international issues and American foreign policy. Between the world wars she supported Soviet-American friendship and was an outspoken opponent of the regime in Nazi Germany. Following World War II she opposed nuclear proliferation. In the 1950s the FBI investigated her politics.

In 1914 she wrote Barbara Richards, a novel about working women that remained unpublished. In 1950 she published a biography of her sister, Margaret Dreier Robins: Her Life, Letters and Work.

== Sources ==
- Barbara Sicherman and Carol Hurd Green, eds., Notable American Women: The Modern Period: A Biographical Dictionary, Volume 4 (Radcliffe College, 1980), 204ff.
- "Dreier, Mary E. (Mary Elizabeth), 1875-1963. Papers, 1797-1963: A Finding Aid." OASIS Online Archival Search Information System; Office for Information Systems; Harvard University Library. Web. 06 Oct. 2011. <https://web.archive.org/web/20180703061223/http://oasis.lib.harvard.edu/oasis/deliver/~sch00136>.
- "Mary Elisabeth Dreier." Dictionary of American Biography. New York: Charles Scribner's Sons, 1981. Gale U.S. History In Context. Web. 7 Oct. 2011.
