= Société Anonyme (art) =

Art organization

Catalog cover for the 1926 International Exhibition of Modern Art. (Exhibition catalog: 135 p. :ill.; 26 x 19 cm. John Henry Bradley Storrs papers, 1847-1987. Smithsonian Institution - Archives of American Art.)

Société Anonyme, Inc. was an art organization founded in 1920 by Katherine Dreier, Man Ray and Marcel Duchamp. The society sponsored lectures, concerts, publications, and exhibitions of modern art, including the International Exhibition of Modern Art at the Brooklyn Museum in 1926. Between 1920 and 1940 they held 80 exhibitions showing mostly Cubist and abstract art. Their galleries in their "first modest headquarters" were at 19 East 47th Street.

Man Ray picked the name "Société Anonyme", having seen it in French magazines, but knowing little French, assumed it referred to some anonymous society. It actually means "Corporation", but Duchamp thought it a fine name and later while the legal paperwork was being written up the "Inc." was added, making its English translation, "Corporation, Inc.".

The Société gave Alexander Archipenko, Wassily Kandinsky, Paul Klee, Fernand Léger, Jacques Villon, and Louis Eilshemius their first one-man shows in America, helped to familiarize American viewers with the little known work of Piet Mondrian and Kurt Schwitters and sponsored traveling exhibitions, lectures by artists and critics, and other special events. It also put on the United States' first comprehensive survey of postwar international art, at the Brooklyn Museum in 1926, three years before the Museum of Modern Art came into existence. Katherine Dreier deeply resented this upstart rival, whose wealthy backers, she felt, had stolen her mission and her ideas and even her name -- the Société Anonyme's subtitle was "Museum of Modern Art." In truth however, Dreier's tireless idealism could not make up for her lack of significant financial support. The Société Anonyme's exhibition rooms were too small, but Dreier's attempts to find larger quarters kept breaking down because the funds, which came mainly from her and her two sisters, were insufficient. Her society – as time went on it became more and more a one-woman operation – could and did claim precedence, nevertheless, as the first museum anywhere in the world that was devoted exclusively to modern art.

The Société's headquarters in New Jersey closed in 1928, but Dreier continued to organize events, and accumulate artwork to add to the Société Anonyme's collection. Dreier donated the collection to the Yale University Art Gallery in 1941.

On April 30, 1950, the 30th anniversary of the Société Anonyme's first exhibition, Dreier and Duchamp hosted a dinner at the New Haven Lawn Club, where they formally dissolved the organization.
