= Frances Kellor =

American social reformer (1873–1952)

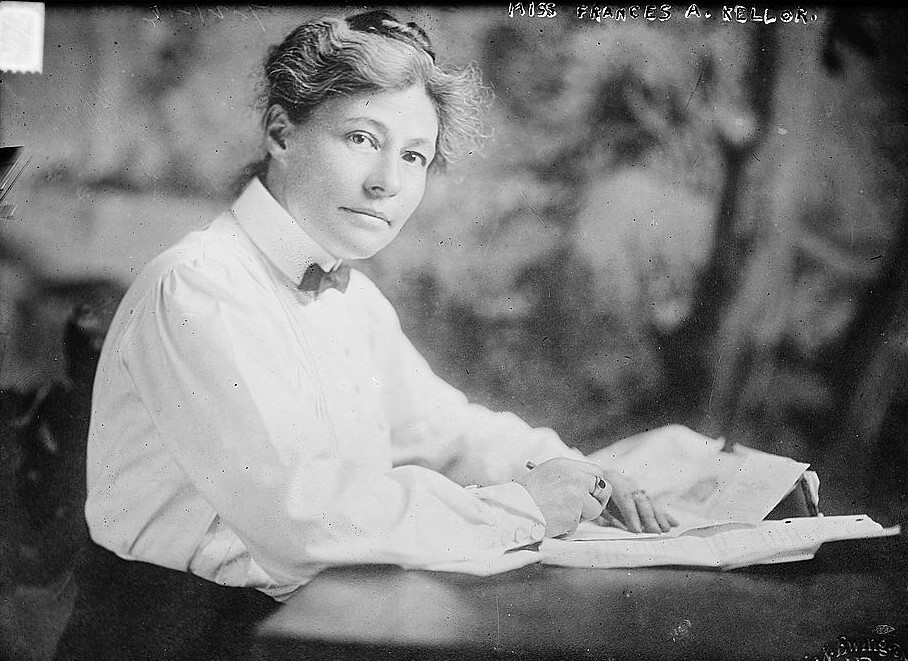
Frances Kellor ca. 1910

Frances Alice Kellor (October 20, 1873 – January 4, 1952) was an American social reformer and investigator, who specialized in the study of immigrants to the United States and women. She was secretary and treasurer of the New York State Immigration Commission in 1909 and chief investigator for the Bureau of Industries and Immigration of New York State in 1910–13. She also oversaw the American Association of Foreign Language Newspapers, and co-founded the American Arbitration Association.

== Early life and education ==
Kellor was born October 20, 1873, in Columbus, Ohio. During Kellors’ childhood, her father left the family, forcing her mother to move to Michigan to work as a laundress. Kellor could not afford to finish high school, leading her to work at a local news company where she eventually became an investigative reporter at the company. It was there that two sisters, Mary and Frances Eddy, took notice of her and helped fund Kellors’ college education. She received her law degree in 1897 from Cornell Law School, and received a scholarship to study sociology and social work at the University of Chicago. At the University of Chicago she wrote her first scholarly article about equality among women and men in physical education, and began her study of prisons which led to her first book, Experimental Sociology. Descriptive and Analytical Delinquents. (1901).

== Career ==
She was secretary and treasurer of the New York State Immigration Commission in 1909 and chief investigator for the Bureau of Industries and Immigration of New York State in 1910–13. She became managing director of the North American Civic League for Immigrants and a member of the Progressive National Committee. She also oversaw the American Association of Foreign Language Newspapers.

She directed the National Americanization Committee (NAC), the most important private organization promoting Americanization during World War I. Speaking for the NAC in 1916, proposed to combine efficiency and patriotism in her Americanization programs. It would be more efficient, she argued, once the factory workers could all understand English and therefore better understand orders and avoid accidents. Once Americanized, they would grasp American industrial ideals and be open to American influences and not subject only to strike agitators or foreign propagandists. The result, she argued would transform indifferent and ignorant residents into understanding voters, to make their homes into American homes, and to establish American standards of living throughout the ethnic communities. Ultimately, she argued it would "unite foreign-born and native alike in enthusiastic loyalty to our national ideals of liberty and justice." Unlike African-American social reformers of the time, Kellor believed that enslavement made it impossible for African-American women to lead moral, respectable lives. Kellor and her cohort of white reformers focused on improving recently emancipated African-American women's efficiency, rather than attempt to challenge the racially restrictive segregationist practices of the Northern society.

In 1916, she became the chairman of the Women's Committee for the National Hughes Alliance, headquartered in the Hotel Astor. The goal of the Hughes Alliance was to organize the women of the country to support Charles E. Hughes in his bid for President of the United States in 1916.

=== Women's activism ===
Kellor focused her works on Women's Rights on studying the treatment of women in education and the work force. Kellor did her work on Women's Rights by completing field work at various locations including studying women in prison, women in the Hull-House in Chicago, women employees, and women in educational settings. In 1904 Kellor published the book Out of Work, in which she discusses immigrant unemployment in the United States. In it Kellor notes that little data had been taken on women's unemployment due to the social opinion that unemployment had little to do with women. She also discussed reasons why women employees had not been able to attain the same standards through union organization as men, the helplessness of unemployed women, and unemployed women and prostitution. Kellor argued for equal treatment of women in educational settings, specifically in physical education. In 1909, she published a book in collaboration with Gertrude Dudley called Athletic Games in the Education of Women, in which they argued that participating in sports could have positive effects for women, since it would allow to them to leave the confines of the home and would make them more socially active.

=== Immigrant rights ===
Kellor was secretary and treasurer of the New York State Immigration Commission in 1909 and chief investigator for the Bureau of Industries and Immigration of New York State in 1910–13. She was brought on by Theodore Roosevelt's 1912 presidential campaign, to help write the Progressive Party's platform. This election marked the first time the party had taken up immigration as a key issue. The platform promised to provide immigrants more opportunities to succeed, as well as reverse policies that neglected immigrants and their rights. Roosevelt lost the election to Woodrow Wilson, but Kellor continued her fight for immigrant rights. At the time, Kellor was the director of the North American Civic League. She began advocating for increased collaboration between private, state, and national efforts, aimed at assimilating, educating, and protecting the rapidly growing immigrant population. In 1914, she left the American Civic League and formed the Committee for Immigrants in America. This committee fought for immigrant rights and education. Kellor's efforts resulted in more than 13% of non-English-speaking immigrants enrolling in citizenship classes by 1915. The movement continued to make progress, but Kellor was not satisfied. She began pressuring the federal government to act and aide immigrants in regards to protection, education, and opportunity. Kellor organized and promoted the National Americanization Day, to be held on July 4, 1915. More than 150 cities nationwide partook in this holiday, which celebrated and welcomed naturalized immigrants. She also oversaw the American Association of Foreign Language Newspapers. She directed the National Americanization Committee (NAC), an important private organization promoting Americanization during World War I. Speaking for the NAC in 1916, she proposed Americanization programs that to combined efficiency and patriotism. It would be more efficient, she argued, once the factory workers could all understand English and therefore better understand orders and avoid accidents. Once Americanized, immigrants would grasp American industrial ideals and be open to American influences. This would make them less subject to strike agitators or and foreign propagandists. The result, she argued would transform less knowledgeable residents into understanding voters, making their homes into American homes, and to establishing American standards of living throughout the ethnic communities. Ultimately, she argued it would "unite foreign-born and native alike in enthusiastic loyalty to our national ideals of liberty and justice."

=== Prisons ===
Kellor felt that crime was due to poor education and unemployment, which ran contrary to the popular belief of the time that criminality was biological. She published several articles and her first book, Experimental Sociology, on the American prison systems. In her research, Kellor examined race and the many conditions that led Southern African Americans to engage in crime. In her articles Kellor also discussed the effect of prison life on crime and placed special emphasis on how debilitating it could be for the social life of African Americans, which in turn could perpetuate crime. She felt that two of the solutions to this issue would be rehabilitation as well as reintegration programs.

=== Arbitration ===
In 1925, Kellor co-founded the American Arbitration Association, and was its first president. In 1947 she wrote “American Arbitration: Its History, Functions and Achievements,” widely considered a foundational text. The book traces the evolution of arbitration in the U.S. and the AAA's role in pioneering and shaping arbitration practices.

== Personal life ==
Kellor never married. She maintained a long-term relationship with another woman, Mary Dreier. Dreier was one of several wealthy, progressive Brooklyn-born sisters who played leading roles in the progressive movement in New York, the other siblings were the artists Katherine Sophie Dreier and Dorothea Dreier, and activist Margaret Dreier. Kellor and Mary shared a home from 1905 until Kellor's death.

She died in New York City on January 4, 1952, and is buried alongside Mary Dreier at Green-Wood Cemetery, Brooklyn, New York.

== Selected works ==
=== Books ===
- Experimental Sociology: Descriptive and Analytical Delinquents (1901)
- Out of Work (1904) with Gertrude Dudley
- Athletic Games in the Education of Women (1909)
- Notaries Public and Immigrants (1909)
- Straight America: A Call to National Service (1916)
- Immigration and the Future (1920) Kellor discusses how views on immigration changed over time, most specifically before and after World War 1. The book delves into how immigration policy will impact flows of people to America. The book discusses the economic implications of open immigration and how a dual economic system was born separating foreign born and native born Americans. The book continues, covering immigration's impact on American business, investment, and assimilation.
- The Federal Administration and the Alien (1921)
- Protocol for the Pacific Settlement of International Disputes in Relation to the Sanction of War (1925) Antonia Hatvany (Collaborator)
- Arbitration in the New Industrial Society (1934)

=== Articles ===
- "Arbitration and the Legal Profession" (undated)
- "Sex and Crime" in International Journal of Ethics (October 1898)
- "Immigration and Household Labor" in Charities (1904)
- "Where Slave Girls are Sold" in The New York Herald (February 14, 1904)
- "Emigration From the South – The Women" in Charities (October 1905)
- "The Immigrant Woman" in The Atlantic Monthly (September 1907)
- "What is Americanization?". Yale Review. January 1919.
- "Criminal Anthropology in Its Relation to Jurisprudence" (January 1899)[4]
- "Criminal Anthropology in Its Relation to Jurisprudence II" (March 1899)[4]
- "Psychological and Environmental Study of Women Criminals I" (January 1900)[4]
- "Psychological and Environmental Study of Women Criminals II" (March 1900)[4]
- "The Criminal Negro: I. A Sociological Study" (January–June 1901)[3]
- "The Criminal Negro: II. Southern Conditions that Influence Negro Criminality" (February 1901)[3]
- "The Criminal Negro: III. Some of His Characteristics" (March 1901)[3]
- "The Criminal Negro: IV. Advantages and Abuses of Southern Penal Systems" (April 1901)[3]
- "The Criminal Negro: V. Physical Measurements of Females" (January–June 1901)[3]
- "The Criminal Negro: VI. Psychological Tests of Females" (July 1901)[3]
- "The Criminal Negro: VII. Childhood Influences" (September 1901)[3]
- "The Criminal Negro: VIII. Environmental Influences" (November 1901)[3]

== Sources ==
- Barbara Sicherman and Carol Hurd Green, eds., Notable American Women: The Modern Period: A Biographical Dictionary, Volume 4 (Radcliffe College, 1980), 393–5, available online
- Ellen F. Fitzpatrick, Endless Crusade: Women Social Scientists and Progressive Reform (New York: Oxford University Press, 1994) shows Kellor's role in the Progressive National Service.
- Kathleen Dalton, Theodore Roosevelt: A Strenuous Life (New York: Alfred A. Knopf, 2002) outlines Kellor's influence on TR.
