= Adlai Stevenson =

Adlai Stevenson may refer to:

- Adlai Stevenson I (1835–1914), U.S. Vice President (1893–1897) and Congressman (1879–1881)
- Adlai Stevenson II (1900–1965), Governor of Illinois (1949–1953), U.S. presidential candidate (1952, 1956, 1960), U.N. Ambassador (1961–1965), grandson of Adlai Stevenson I
- Adlai Stevenson III (1930–2021) U.S. Senator (1970–1981), candidate for Illinois governor (1982, 1986), son of Adlai Stevenson II

== See also ==
- Adlai Stevenson House (disambiguation)
- Adlai E. Stevenson High School (disambiguation)
- Stevenson College (University of California, Santa Cruz)
- Stevenson family
