= 1912 Illinois gubernatorial election =

- November 5, 1912
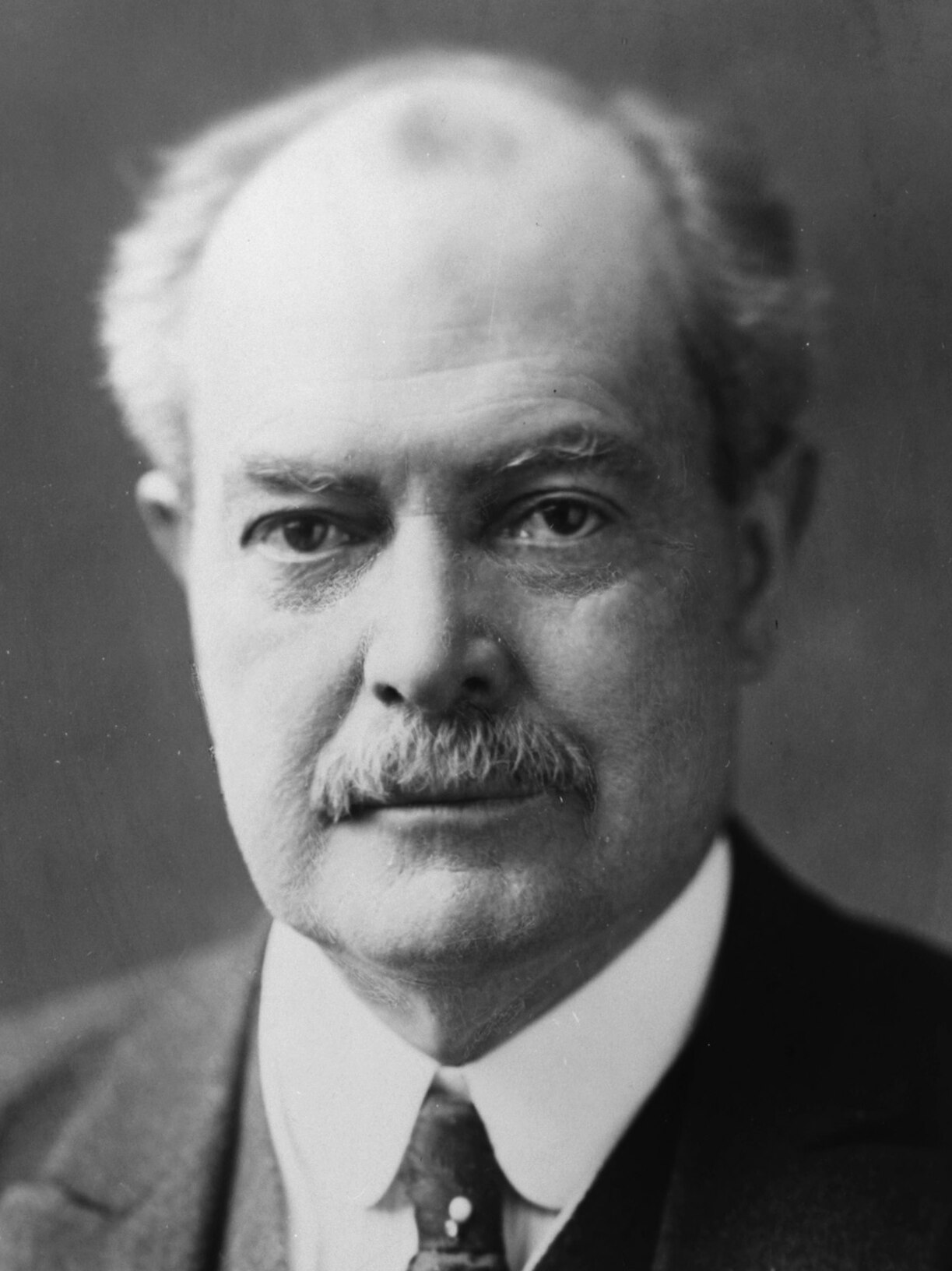

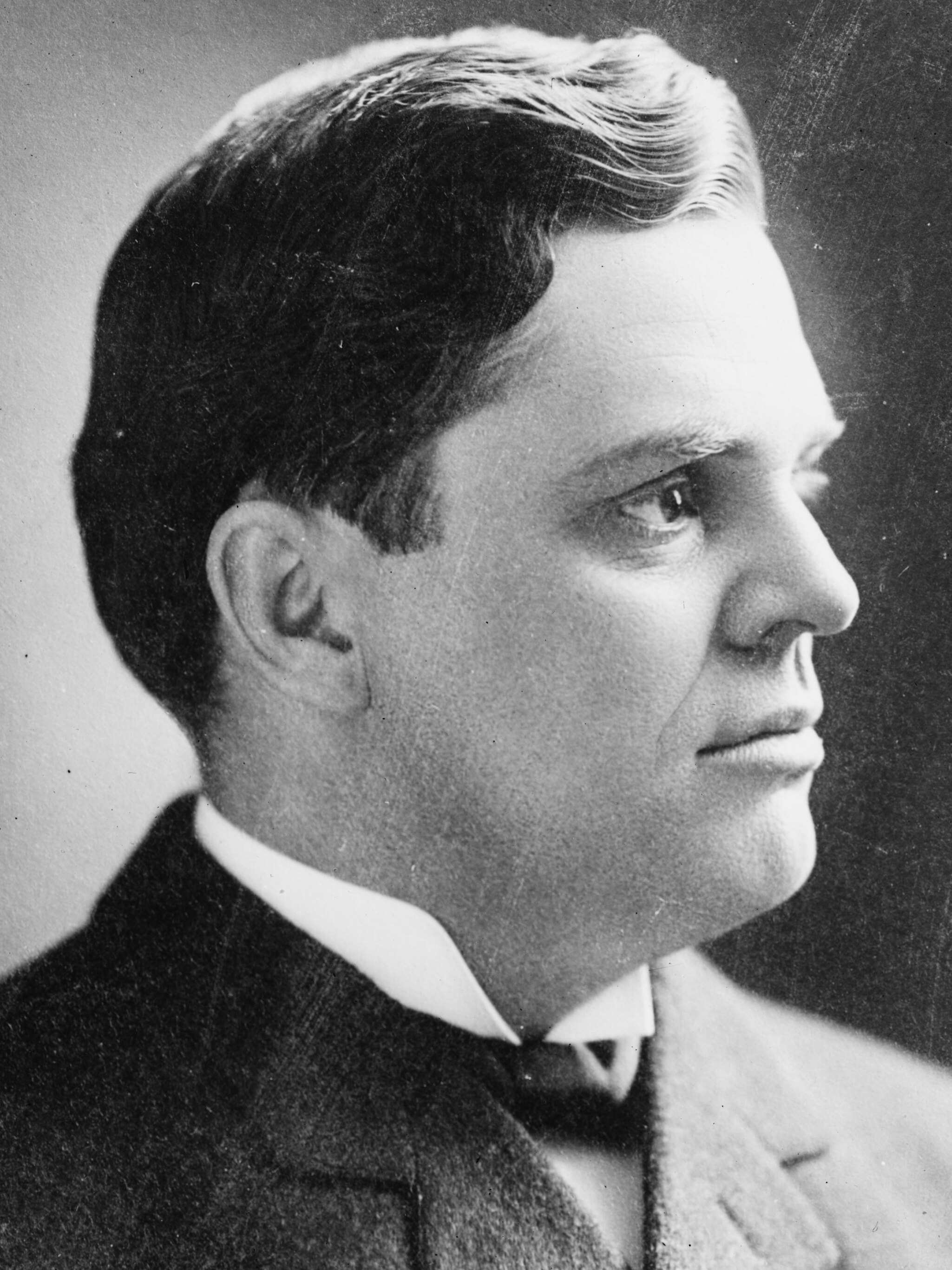

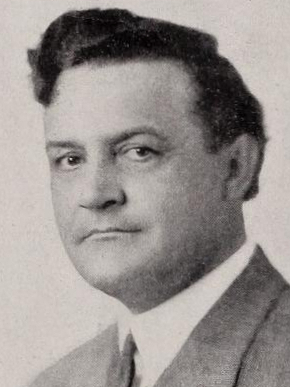

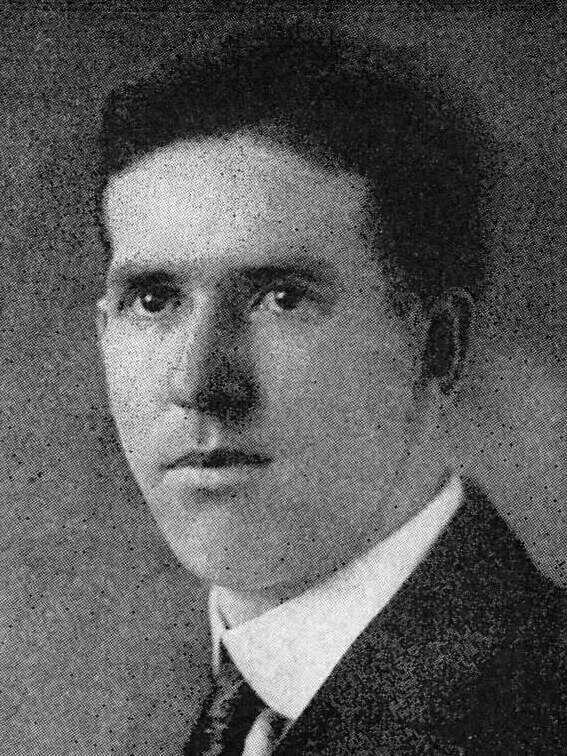
Nominee	Edward Fitzsimmons Dunne	Charles S. Deneen
Party	Democratic	Republican
Popular vote	443,120	318,469
Percentage	38.11%	27.39%
Nominee	Frank H. Funk	John C. Kennedy
Party	Progressive	Socialist
Popular vote	303,401	78,679
Percentage	26.09%	6.77%
- County results Dunne: 30–40% 40–50% 50–60% Deneen: 30–40% 40–50% 60–70% Funk: 30–40% 40–50% 50–60%
Governor before election
Charles S. Deneen
Republican
Elected Governor
Edward Fitzsimmons Dunne
Democratic

The 1912 Illinois gubernatorial election was held on November 5, 1912. Republican incumbent Charles S. Deneen ran for a third term in office but was defeated by the Democratic former mayor of Chicago Edward Fitzsimmons Dunne.

Primary elections were held on April 9. Dunne defeated 1900 nominee Sam Alschuler and former U.S. representative Ben Caldwell in the Democratic primary. Deneen survived a serious primary challenge from several candidates, led by former state treasurer Len Small, with just a plurality of the vote.

Dunne was the first Democratic Governor of Illinois elected since 1892 and only the second since 1852. To date, this is the first and only time that a former Chicago mayor was elected governor of Illinois.

== Republican primary ==
=== Candidates ===
- John J. Brown, former state representative from Vandalia
- Charles S. Deneen, incumbent governor of Illinois since 1905
- Charles F. Hurburgh, state senator from Galesburg
- Walter C. Jones, state senator from Chicago
- J. McCan Davis, clerk of the Supreme Court of Illinois
- Len Small, former Illinois treasurer
- John E. W. Wayman, Cook County state's attorney
- Richard Yates Jr., former governor of Illinois

=== Results ===
County map of the 1912 Illinois Republican gubernatorial primary Deneen: <30% 30–40% 40–50% 50–60% 60–70% Small: <30% 30–40% 40–50% 50–60% 60–70% Wayman: <30% 30–40% Yates: 30–40% 40–50% Brown: <30% 30–40% 40–50% 50–60% 60–70% 70–80% Hurburgh: 30–40% 40–50% 60–70%

Republican primary results
Party	Candidate	Votes	%
Republican	Charles S. Deneen (incumbent)	152,997	34.80
Republican	Len Small	88,829	20.20
Republican	John E. W. Wayman	61,178	13.92
Republican	Richard Yates Jr.	45,325	10.31
Republican	John J. Brown	31,995	7.28
Republican	Charles F. Hurburgh	29,992	6.82
Republican	Walter C. Jones	22,491	5.12
Republican	J. McCan Davis	6,855	1.56
Total votes		439,662	100.00

== Democratic primary ==
=== Candidates ===
- Samuel Alschuler, former state representative from Aurora and nominee for governor in 1900
- Ben F. Caldwell, former U.S. representative from Chatham
- George E. Dickson
- Edward F. Dunne, former mayor of Chicago

=== Results ===
County map of the 1912 Illinois Democratic gubernatorial primary Dunne: 30–40% 40–50% 50–60% 60–70% Alschuler: 30–40% 40–50% 50–60% 60–70% 80–90% Caldwell: 30–40% 40–50% 50–60% 60–70% 70–80% 80–90% >90%

Democratic primary results
Party	Candidate	Votes	%
Democratic	Edward F. Dunne	131,212	43.83
Democratic	Samuel Alschuler	87,127	29.11
Democratic	Ben F. Caldwell	71,972	24.04
Democratic	George E. Dickson	9,034	3.02
Total votes		299,345	100.00

== Other primaries ==
=== Prohibition primary ===
==== Candidates ====
- Edwin R. Worrell, Presbyterian minister

==== Results ====
Prohibition primary results
Party	Candidate	Votes	%
Prohibition	Edwin R. Worrell	3,568	100.00
Total votes		3,568	100.00

=== Socialist primary ===
==== Candidates ====
- John C. Kennedy, Chicago alderman for the 27th ward

==== Results ====
Socialist primary results
Party	Candidate	Votes	%
Socialist	John C. Kennedy	8,333	100.00
Total votes		8,333	100.00

== General election ==
=== Candidates ===
- Charles S. Deneen, incumbent governor since 1905 (Republican)
- Edward F. Dunne, former mayor of Chicago (Democratic)
- John M. Francis, perennial candidate (Socialist Labor)
- Frank H. Funk, former state senator (Progressives for S.J.)
- John C. Kennedy, Chicago alderman for the 27th ward (Socialist)
- Edwin R. Worrell, Presbyterian minister (Prohibition)

=== Results ===
1912 Illinois gubernatorial election
Party	Candidate	Votes	%	±%
Democratic	Edward F. Dunne	443,120	38.11%	
Republican	Charles S. Deneen (incumbent)	318,469	27.39%	
Progressive	Frank H. Funk	303,401	26.09%	
Socialist	John C. Kennedy	78,679	6.77%	
Prohibition	Edwin R. Worrell	15,231	1.31%	
Socialist Labor	John M. Francis	3,980	0.34%	
Majority		124,651	10.72%	
Turnout		1,163,480	100.00%	
Democratic gain from Republican		Swing		

== See also ==
- 1912 Illinois lieutenant gubernatorial election

== Bibliography ==
- Compiled by Harry Woods, Secretary of State (1914). Blue Book of the State of Illinois, 1913–14. Danville, Illinois: Illinois Printing Company.
- Compiled by Cornelius J. Doyle, Secretary of State (1912). Official vote of the State of Illinois cast at the Primary Election held on April 9, 1912. Springfield, Illinois: Illinois State Journal Co., State Printers.
- Compiled by Cornelius J. Doyle, Secretary of State (1913). Official vote of the State of Illinois cast at the General Election, November 5, 1912; Judicial Election, June 3, 1912; Special Elections, 1911 and 1912. Springfield, Illinois: Illinois State Journal Co., State Printers.
