= Adlai Stevenson House =

The Adlai Stevenson House or Adlai E. Stevenson House may refer to one of several buildings in the United States:

- Adlai E. Stevenson I House, Metamora, Woodford County, Illinois — where Adlai Stevenson I lived from 1866
- Dodson-Stevenson House, also known as the Adlai Stevenson I House, on North McLean Street on Franklin Square (Bloomington, Illinois), McLean County, Illinois — an 1869 house where Adlai Stevenson I lived
- Birthplace of Adlai E. Stevenson II, Los Angeles, Los Angeles County, California — where the presidential candidate was born in 1900
- Stevenson House (Bloomington, Illinois), also known as the Adlai E. Stevenson II House, on East Washington Street in Bloomington, McLean County, Illinois — where Adlai Stevenson II lived from 1906
- Adlai E. Stevenson II Farm, also known as the Adlai E. Stevenson Historic Home, in Mettawa, Lake County, Illinois — where Adlai Stevenson II lived from 1936 to 1965
