= Stevenson (disambiguation) =

Stevenson is a surname, and it may also refer to:

In places:

- Stevenson, Alabama, USA
- Stevenson, Indiana, USA
- Stevenson, Maryland, USA
- Stevenson, Washington, USA

In educational institutions:

- Adlai E. Stevenson High School (disambiguation), (various locations)
- Stevenson College (Edinburgh)
- Stevenson College (University of California, Santa Cruz), residential college at the University of California, Santa Cruz
- Stevenson University, in Baltimore County, Maryland
- Stevenson School
  - upper school campus in Pebble Beach, California, USA
  - lower school campus in Carmel, California, USA

In other uses:

- Donoghue v. Stevenson, legal case originating in Scotland
- Stevenson and Higgins, Scottish cabinet company
- Stevenson screen an enclosure for meteorological instruments
- Stevenson Expressway, the name for Interstate 55 in Cook County, Illinois

== See also ==
- Stephenson (disambiguation)
