= 1908 Illinois gubernatorial election =

Election for Illinois governor

- November 3, 1908
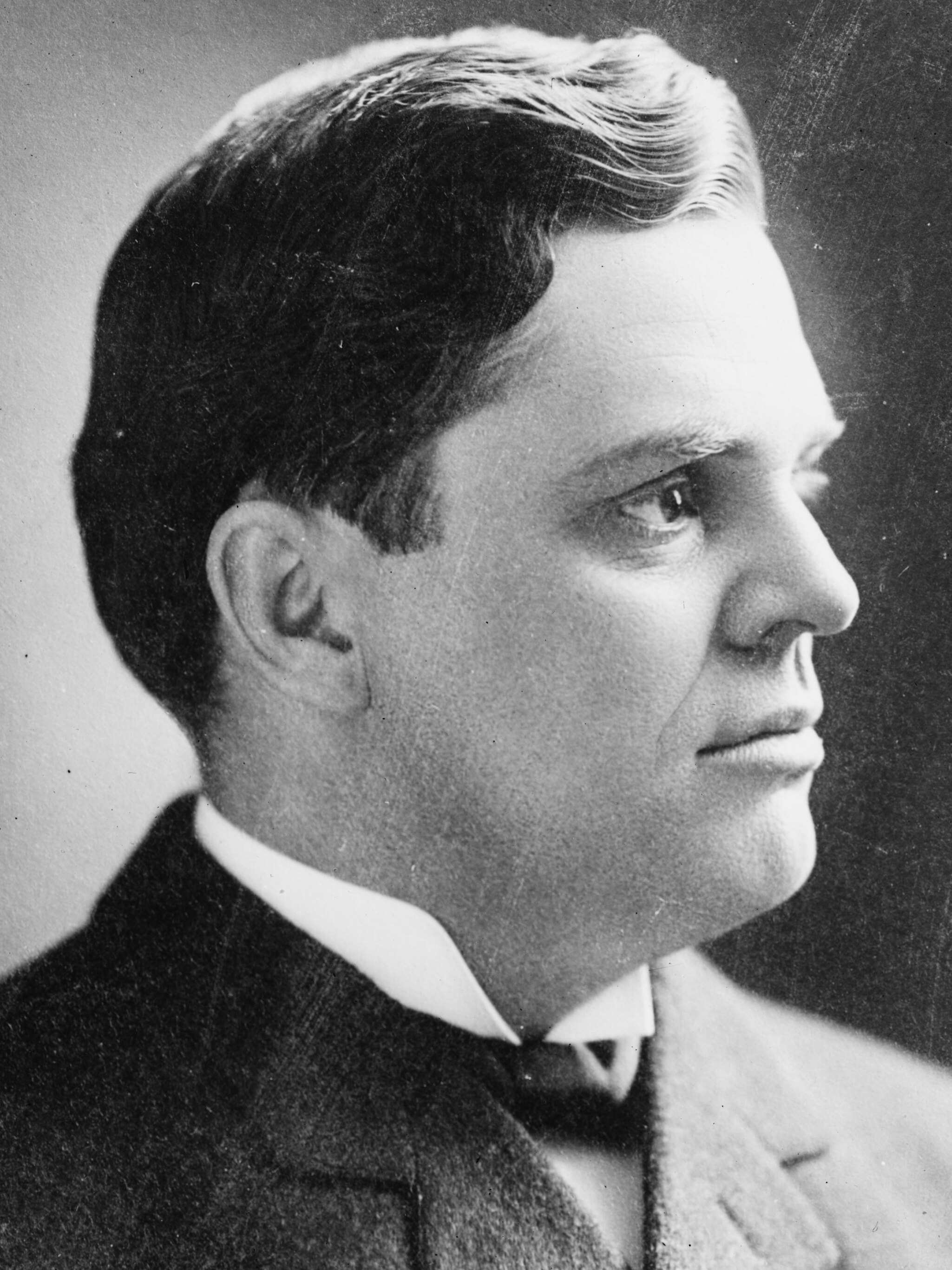

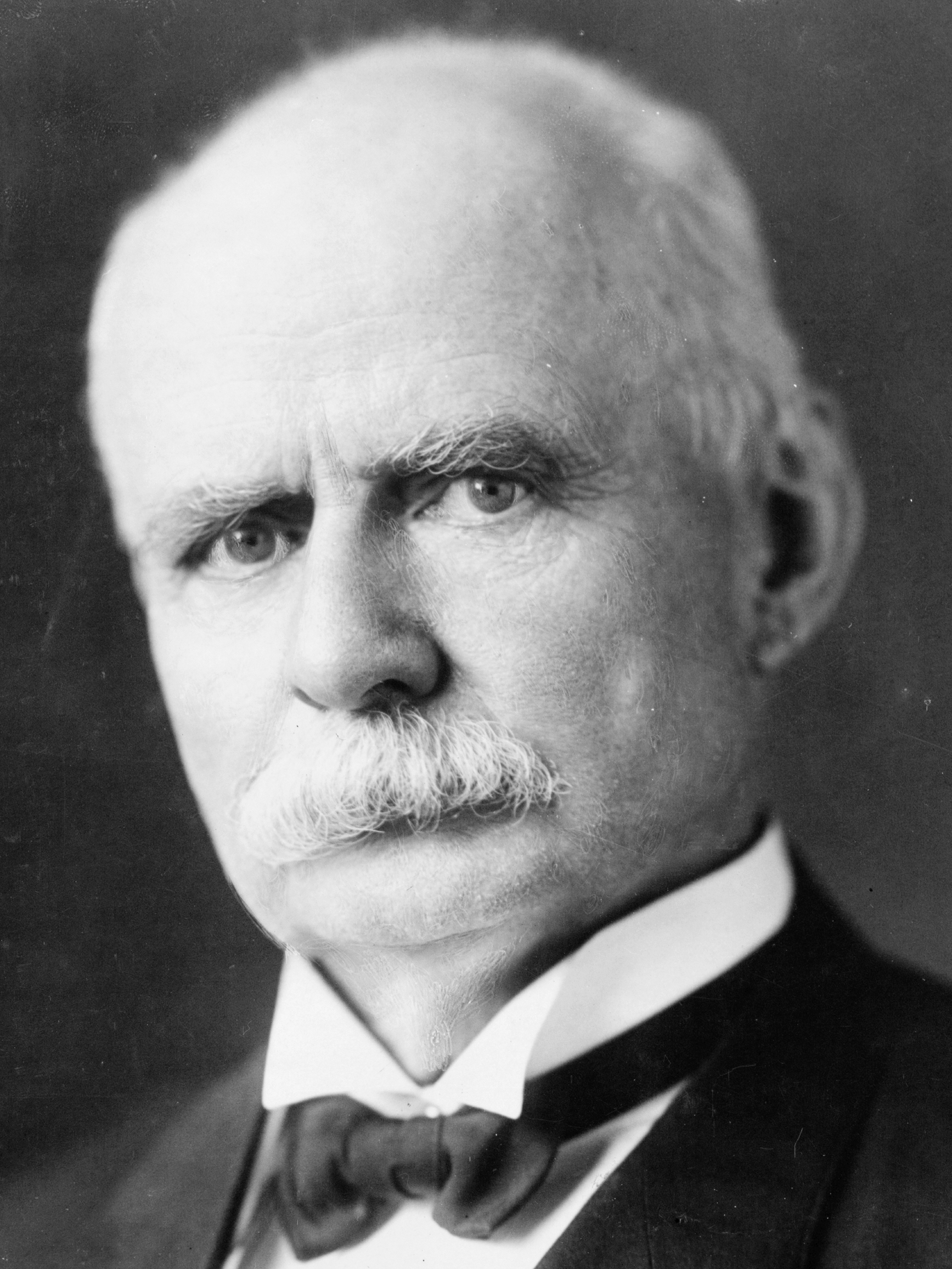
Nominee	Charles S. Deneen	Adlai Stevenson I
Party	Republican	Democratic
Popular vote	550,076	526,912
Percentage	47.64%	45.64%
- County results Deneen: 40–50% 50–60% 60–70% 70–80% Stevenson: 40–50% 50–60% 60–70%
Governor before election
Charles S. Deneen
Republican
Elected Governor
Charles S. Deneen
Republican

The 1908 Illinois gubernatorial election was held on November 3, 1908. Republican incumbent Charles S. Deneen was elected to a second term in office over former vice president Adlai Stevenson I. This was the first Illinois election to use direct primary elections for the nomination of candidates.

Primary elections were held on August 8. In the Republican primary, Deneen narrowly survived a challenge from former governor Richard Yates Jr., whom he had defeated at a lengthy and drawn-out convention in 1904. Stevenson won the Democratic nomination over J. Hamilton Lewis with a large plurality of the vote.

== Republican primary ==
=== Candidates ===
- Charles S. Deneen, incumbent governor since 1905
- Richard Yates Jr., former governor

=== Results ===
Republican primary results
Party	Candidate	Votes	%
Republican	Charles S. Deneen (incumbent)	212,983	51.44
Republican	Richard Yates Jr.	201,034	48.56
Total votes		414,017	100.00

== Democratic primary ==
=== Candidates ===
- Charles F. Gunther, former Chicago treasurer
- Eugene Kimbrough
- J. Hamilton Lewis, former Chicago corporation counsel and U.S. representative for Washington's at-large district
- John P. McGoorty, state representative from Chicago
- James O. Monroe, candidate for U.S. representative in 1902 and 1904
- Douglas Pattison, state representative from Freeport
- Adlai Stevenson, former vice president of the United States

=== Results ===
Democratic primary results
Party	Candidate	Votes	%
Democratic	Adlai E. Stevenson I	79,773	45.62
Democratic	J. Hamilton Lewis	30,214	17.28
Democratic	Douglas Pattison	24,608	14.07
Democratic	John P. McGoorty	23,543	13.46
Democratic	Charles F. Gunther	10,705	6.12
Democratic	James O. Monroe	4,305	2.46
Democratic	Eugene Kimbrough	1,707	0.98
Total votes		174,855	100.00

== Other primaries ==
=== Prohibition primary ===
==== Candidates ====
- Eugene W. Chafin, perennial candidate
- Daniel R. Sheen, former state representative from Peoria

==== Results ====
Prohibition primary results
Party	Candidate	Votes	%
Prohibition	Daniel R. Sheen	3,604	53.58
Prohibition	Eugene W. Chafin	3,123	46.42
Total votes		6,727	100.00

=== Socialist primary ===
==== Candidates ====
- James H. Brower, candidate for lieutenant governor in 1904

==== Results ====
Socialist primary results
Party	Candidate	Votes	%
Socialist	James H. Brower	4,542	100.00
Total votes		4,542	100.00

== General election ==
=== Candidates ===
- James H. Brower, candidate for lieutenant governor in 1904 (Socialist)
- Charles S. Deneen, incumbent governor since 1905 (Republican)
- Gustav A. Jennings (Socialist Labor)
- George W. McCaskrin, former mayor of Rock Island (Independence League)
- Daniel R. Sheen, former state representative from Peoria (Prohibition)
- Adlai Stevenson, former vice president of the United States (Democratic)

=== Results ===
1908 Illinois gubernatorial election
Party	Candidate	Votes	%	±%
Republican	Charles S. Deneen (incumbent)	550,076	47.64%	
Democratic	Adlai E. Stevenson I	526,912	45.64%	
Prohibition	Daniel R. Sheen	33,922	2.94%	
Socialist	James H. Brower	31,293	2.71%	
Independence	George W. McCaskrin	10,883	0.94%	
Socialist Labor	Gustav A. Jennings	1,526	0.13%	
Majority		23,164	2.01%	
Turnout		1,154,612	100.00%	
Republican hold		Swing		

== See also ==
- 1908 Illinois lieutenant gubernatorial election

== Bibliography ==
- Compiled by James A. Rose, Secretary of State (1908). Blue Book of the State of Illinois, 1907-08. Springfield, Illinois: Phillips Bros., State Printers.
- Compiled by James A. Rose, Secretary of State (1909). Blue Book of the State of Illinois, 1909-10. Danville, Illinois: Illinois Printing Company.
- Compiled by James A. Rose, Secretary of State (1908). Official vote of the State of Illinois cast at the General and Special Elections, November 3, 1908. Springfield, Illinois: Illinois State Journal Co., State Printers.
