= Stevenson College =

Stevenson College may refer to:

- Stevenson College (Edinburgh)
- Stevenson College (University of California, Santa Cruz)
