= Dietrich C. Smith =

American politician

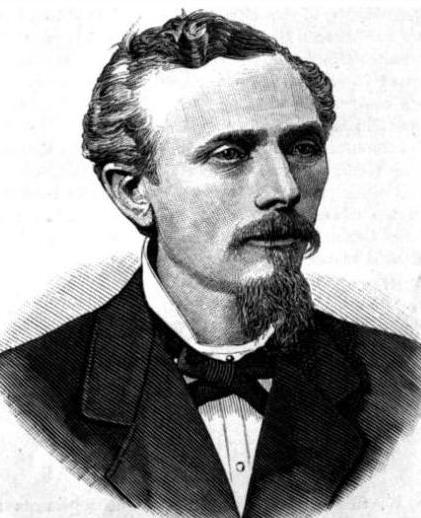

Member of the U.S. House of Representatives from Illinois's 13th district
- In office March 4, 1881 – March 3, 1883
- Preceded by: Adlai Stevenson I
- Succeeded by: William McKendree Springer

Member of the Illinois House of Representatives
- In office 1876-1878

Personal details
- Born: April 4, 1840 East Frisia, Hanover
- Died: April 18, 1914 (aged 74) Pekin, Illinois, U.S.
- Party: Republican

Dietrich Conrad Smith (April 4, 1840 – April 18, 1914) was a U.S. Representative from Illinois.

== Biography ==
Smith was born in East Frisia, Kingdom of Hanover. He immigrated to the United States with his parents, who settled in Pekin, Illinois, about 1850. He then attended the public schools of Pekin, Illinois, and Quincy College (now Quincy University), Quincy, Illinois.

During the Civil War he served in the Union Army as lieutenant in Company I, Eighth Regiment, Illinois Volunteer Infantry. He left the service as captain of Company C, One Hundred and Thirty-ninth Regiment, Illinois Volunteer Infantry. He was an organizer of the German College at Mount Pleasant in 1874. He served as member of board of trustees of that institution for many years. He served as member of the State house of representatives 1876-1878. He engaged in banking and manufacturing and also in the construction and management of railroads in Illinois.

Smith was elected as a Republican to the Forty-seventh Congress (March 4, 1881 – March 3, 1883). He was an unsuccessful candidate for reelection in 1882 to the Forty-eighth Congress. He again engaged in banking. He died in Pekin, Illinois, April 18, 1914. He was interred in Lakeside Cemetery.

U.S. House of Representatives
Preceded by Adlai E. Stevenson I	Member of the U.S. House of Representatives from Illinois's 13th congressional district 1881-1883	Succeeded by William M. Springer
