= Thomas F. Tipton =

American politician

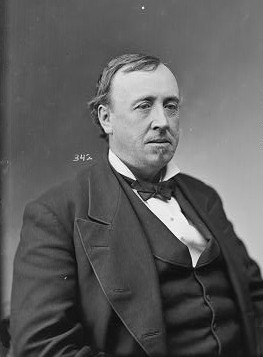

Member of the U.S. House of Representatives from Illinois's 13th district
- In office March 4, 1877 – March 3, 1879
- Preceded by: Adlai Stevenson I
- Succeeded by: Adlai Stevenson I

Personal details
- Born: August 29, 1833 Harrisburg, Ohio, U.S.
- Died: February 7, 1904 (aged 70) Bloomington, Illinois, U.S.
- Party: Republican

Thomas Foster Tipton (August 29, 1833 – February 7, 1904) was a U.S. Representative from Illinois.

== Biography ==
Thomas F. Tipton was born near Harrisburg, Ohio on August 29, 1833. He attended the public schools. He moved with his parents to McLean County, Illinois, in 1843. He read law, was admitted to the bar in 1854, and began working as a lawyer.

He served as state attorney for the eighth judicial district of Illinois in 1867 and 1868.

Tipton was elected circuit judge of the eighth judicial circuit in 1870, and upon the reorganization of the circuit court under the new constitution was reelected circuit judge of the fourteenth judicial circuit.

Tipton was elected as a Republican to the Forty-fifth Congress (March 4, 1877 – March 3, 1879). He was an unsuccessful candidate for reelection in 1878 to the Forty-sixth Congress.

Tipton was again elected circuit judge and served from 1891 to 1897. He resumed the practice of law. He died in Bloomington, McLean County, Illinois, February 7, 1904, and was interred in Evergreen Cemetery.

U.S. House of Representatives
Preceded by Adlai E. Stevenson I	Member of the U.S. House of Representatives from Illinois's 12th congressional district 1877-1879	Succeeded by Adlai E. Stevenson I
