= Stevenson family =

American political family

Stevenson
- Political family
- Current region: Illinois
- Origin: Illinois
- Titles: List: Vice President of the United States; Governor of Illinois; United States Senator; United States Ambassador to the United Nations; Secretary of State of Illinois; Member of the U.S. House of Representatives; First Assistant United States Postmaster General; State's Attorney of Woodford County, Illinois; Second Lady of the United States; President General of the National Society Daughters of the American Revolution; First Lady of Illinois; Member of the Illinois House of Representatives; Treasurer of Illinois
- Members: Adlai Stevenson I Lewis Stevenson; Adlai Stevenson II; Adlai Stevenson III

The Stevenson family is an American family of politicians from Illinois in the Democratic Party, at least four named Adlai E. Stevenson.

John Turner Stevenson	Eliza Ewing Stevenson
Letitia Stevenson	Adlai Stevenson I	William Washington Stevenson
Mary Stevenson	Julia Stevenson Hardin	Letitia Ewing Stevenson	Lewis Stevenson	Helen Louise Davis	Charles T. Stevenson
Ellen Stevenson	Adlai Stevenson II	Elizabeth "Buffy" Stevenson	Edgar McLean Stevenson, Sr.
Nancy Anderson	Adlai Stevenson III	Borden Stevenson	John Fell Stevenson	Edgar McLean Stevenson, Jr.
Adlai Stevenson IV
Adlai Stevenson V

== Members ==
- Adlai Ewing Stevenson I (October 23, 1835 – June 14, 1914)
  - 23rd Vice President of the United States, 1893–1897
  - United States Representative from Illinois, 1875–1877, 1879–1881
- Lewis Stevenson (August 15, 1868 – April 5, 1929)
  - 23rd Illinois Secretary of State, 1914–1917
- Adlai Ewing Stevenson II (February 5, 1900 – July 14, 1965)
  - 5th United States Ambassador to the United Nations, 1961–1965
  - Democratic Party presidential nominee, 1952 and 1956
  - 31st Governor of Illinois, 1949–1953
- McLean Stevenson (November 14, 1927 – February 15, 1996)
  - Actor; played Lieutenant Colonel Henry Braymore Blake in M*A*S*H, 1972-1975
- Adlai Ewing Stevenson III (October 10, 1930 – September 6, 2021)
  - United States Senator from Illinois, 1970–1981
  - 63rd Treasurer of Illinois, 1967–1970
- Edward T. Foote II (December 15, 1937 – February 15, 2016)
  - 4th President of the University of Miami, 1981–2001
