= Birthplace of Adlai E. Stevenson II =

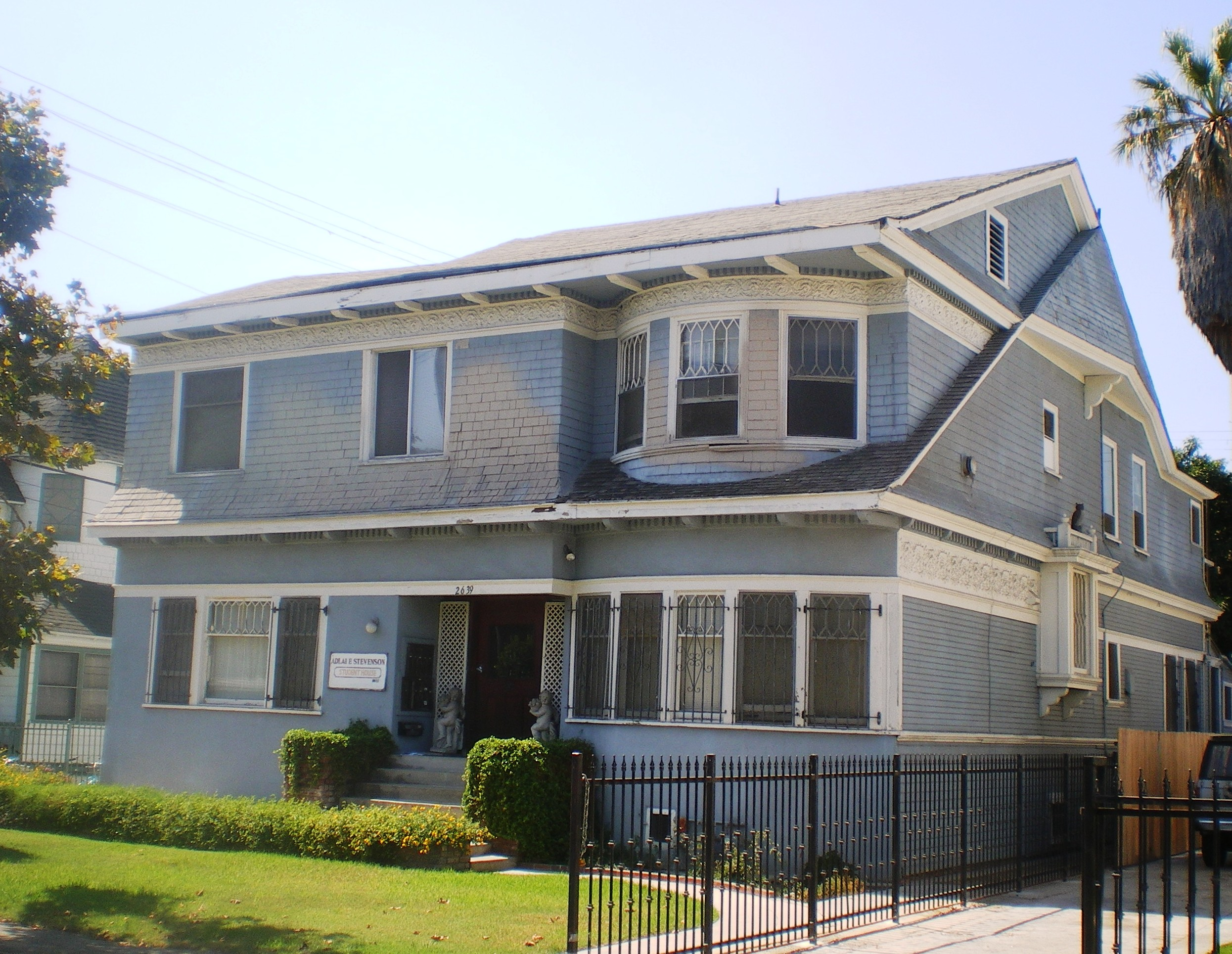
- 2639 Monmouth in 2008

- Location within the Los Angeles metropolitan area
- 34.0311°N 118.2852°W
- Location: 2639 Monmouth Avenue, West Adams, Los Angeles

Site notes
- Governing body: private

Los Angeles Historic-Cultural Monument
- Designated: August 20, 1965
- Reference no.: 35

Birthplace of Adlai E. Stevenson II is a Los Angeles Historic-Cultural Monument (No. 35) in the West Adams neighborhood of Los Angeles, California.

The house was designed by C.W. Wedgewood and built in approximately 1894.

Adlai E. Stevenson II, was born in the master bedroom on February 5, 1900. Stevenson's father, Lewis Stevenson moved to Los Angeles for his health and worked as assistant business manager of the Los Angeles Examiner. The neighborhood was known at the time as "millionaire row." The family moved to Illinois when Stevenson was six years old.

The house was the home of Judge Ygnacio Sepúlveda, the first judge of Los Angeles County and a member of the prominent Sepúlveda family of California, in the 1910s. Sepúlveda died in the house in December 1916.

During the 1920s, the house was the home of silent film star Bebe Daniels.

2639 Monmouth in 1952

In 1932, the home became a rooming house known as "The Grange". It was partitioned into 20 apartments. Over the years, it was used a housing "for elderly ladies, college students and workers." Stevenson returned for a visit to the home in September 1952 during the 1952 United States presidential election.

One month after Stevenson died in July 1965, the City of Los Angeles declared the house as the city's Historic-Cultural Monument No. 35.

The house later was later partitioned again into 11 apartments as the "Adlai E. Stevenson Student House," serving as student housing for the University of Southern California. A 1989 newspaper article reported on the property's soiled carpeting and yellowed wallpaper: "There is little dignified about the dwelling now."

== See also ==
- List of Los Angeles Historic-Cultural Monuments in South Los Angeles
