= James Stevenson Ewing =

American diplomat (1835–1918)

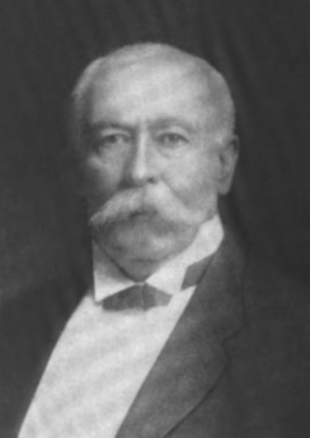
- Born: July 19, 1835; Woodford County, Illinois, U.S.
- Died: February 7, 1918 (aged 82); Bloomington, Illinois, U.S.
- Occupations: Diplomat, lawyer
- Political party: Democratic
- Spouse: Katherine Spencer (m. 1866)
- Children: 6

James Stevenson Ewing (July 19, 1835 – February 7, 1918) was an American diplomat and lawyer.

== Biography ==
James Stevenson Ewing was born in Woodford County, Illinois. In 1849, he moved with his family to Bloomington, Illinois. Ewing was a cousin of Adlai Stevenson who served as Vice President of the United States during the administration of President Grover Cleveland. Ewing went to Illinois Wesleyan University, and then graduated from Centre College in Danville, Kentucky. Ewing was admitted to the Illinois bar and practiced law in Bloomington.

He married Katherine Spencer on June 28, 1866, and they had six children.

Ewing was a Democrat. He served as extraordinary envoy and minister plenpoteniary to Belgium from 1893 to 1897 and was appointed by President Cleveland. He continued to practice law in Bloomington.

Ewing died at his home in Bloomington after suffering from a stroke.
