= Daniel R. Sheen =

American politician and lawyer

Daniel Robinson Sheen (November 29, 1852 – April 23, 1926) was an American politician and lawyer.

Sheen was born in Peoria County, Illinois. He went to the public and business schools. Sheen read law and was admitted to the Illinois bar in 1874. Sheen lived in Peoria, Illinois and practiced law in Peoria. Sheen served in the Illinois House of Representatives in 1905 and 1906 and was elected on the Prohibition Party ticket. In the 1908 Illinois gubernatorial election, Sheen ran for Governor of Illinois on the Prohibition Party ticket and lost the election. Sheen died from a heart attack in Peoria, Illinois.
