= Stephenson (disambiguation) =

Stephenson is a surname.

Stephenson may also refer to:

== Places ==
In the United States:

- Stephenson, Michigan
- Stephenson, Wisconsin
- Stephenson County, Illinois
- Stephenson Township, Michigan

== Other ==
- Stephenson College, Durham, a college of the University of Durham, England
- Stephenson College, Coalville, in Leicestershire with a campus in Lenton, Nottingham, England
- Stephenson High School, Stone Mountain, Georgia
- Stephenson's Rocket, an early steam locomotive
- Stephenson Scholarship Hall, University of Kansas, in the United States
- Stephenson's Catalogue, an astronomical catalogue
- The John Stephenson Company, a major builder of streetcars in the 19th and early 20th centuries
- Stephenson gauge, a railway track gauge

== See also ==
- Stevenson (disambiguation)
