= Harry Woods (Illinois politician) =

American politician

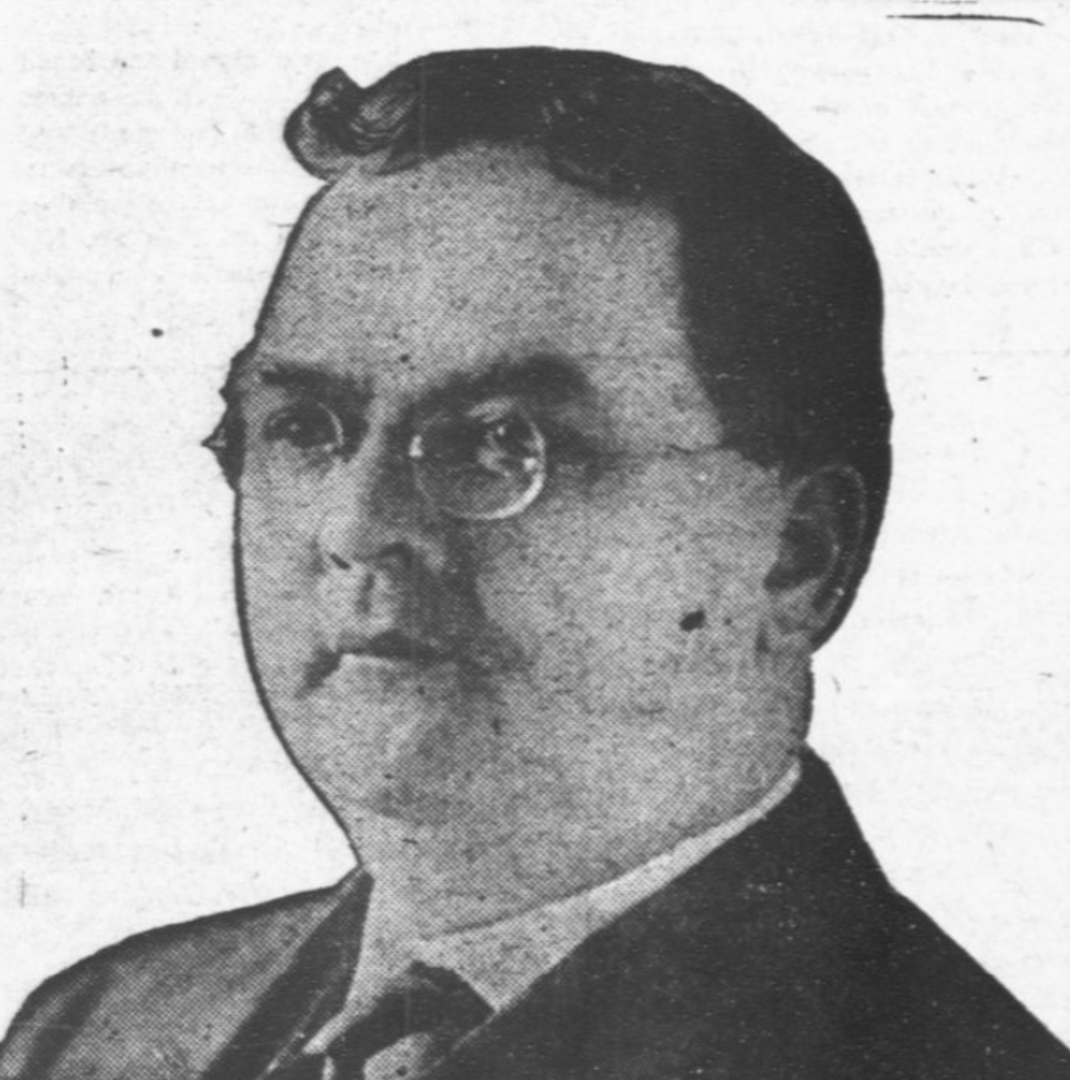
- Woods featured in the Broad Ax (Salt Lake City, Utah)

22nd Secretary of State of Illinois
- In office February 3, 1913 – October 12, 1914
- Governor: Edward F. Dunne
- Preceded by: Cornelius J. Doyle
- Succeeded by: Lewis Stevenson

Personal details
- Born: Harry Woods; 1863 Canada
- Died: October 12, 1914 (aged 50–51) Chicago, Illinois
- Party: Democratic
- Profession: Investor

Harry Woods (1863 – October 12, 1914) was an American politician and businessman.

Born in Canada, Woods emigrated to the United States in 1877 and settled in Chicago, Illinois. Woods was a messenger and then, in 1890, worked in the grain trade business. From 1913 until his death in 1914 Woods, a Democrat, served as Illinois Secretary of State. In 1914, he ran unsuccessfully for the U.S. Senate. Later that year Woods killed himself in his garage at his home, with a shotgun. The believed motivation for his suicide was his emotional despondency over his senate election loss.

== Notes ==
Party political offices
| Preceded by Xelpho F. Beidler | Democratic nominee for Secretary of State of Illinois; 1912 | Succeeded by Lewis Stevenson |
Political offices
| Preceded by Cornelius J. Doyle | Secretary of State of Illinois; 1913–1914 | Succeeded by Lewis Stevenson |
