= Cornelius J. Doyle =

American politician (1871-1938)

Cornelius James Doyle (December 6, 1871 – April 29, 1938) was an American lawyer and politician.

Born in Carlinville, Illinois, Doyle moved to Greenfield, Illinois with his family and went to the Greenfield public schools. He learned to become a tailor and worked as a clerk in a clothing store in Carlinville. Doyle then studied law and was admitted to the Illinois bar. He served as Greenfield city attorney and was involved with the Republican Party. He served as the Illinois Parole Commissioner and as secretary of the Illinois Board of Arbitration. In 1903, Doyle served as the superintendent of the Illinois Building of the Louisiana Purchase Exposition. In 1912, Doyle was appointed Illinois Secretary of State when the incumbent James A. Rose died in office. He was defeated for re-election in the November 1912 general election. Doyle died at a hospital in Springfield, Illinois from complications from surgery for appendicitis.

== Notes ==
Party political offices
Preceded by James A. Rose	Republican nominee for Secretary of State of Illinois; 1912	Succeeded by Louis Lincoln Emmerson
Political offices
Preceded by James A. Rose	Secretary of State of Illinois; 1912–1913	Succeeded by Harry Woods
