= John P. McGoorty =

American politician

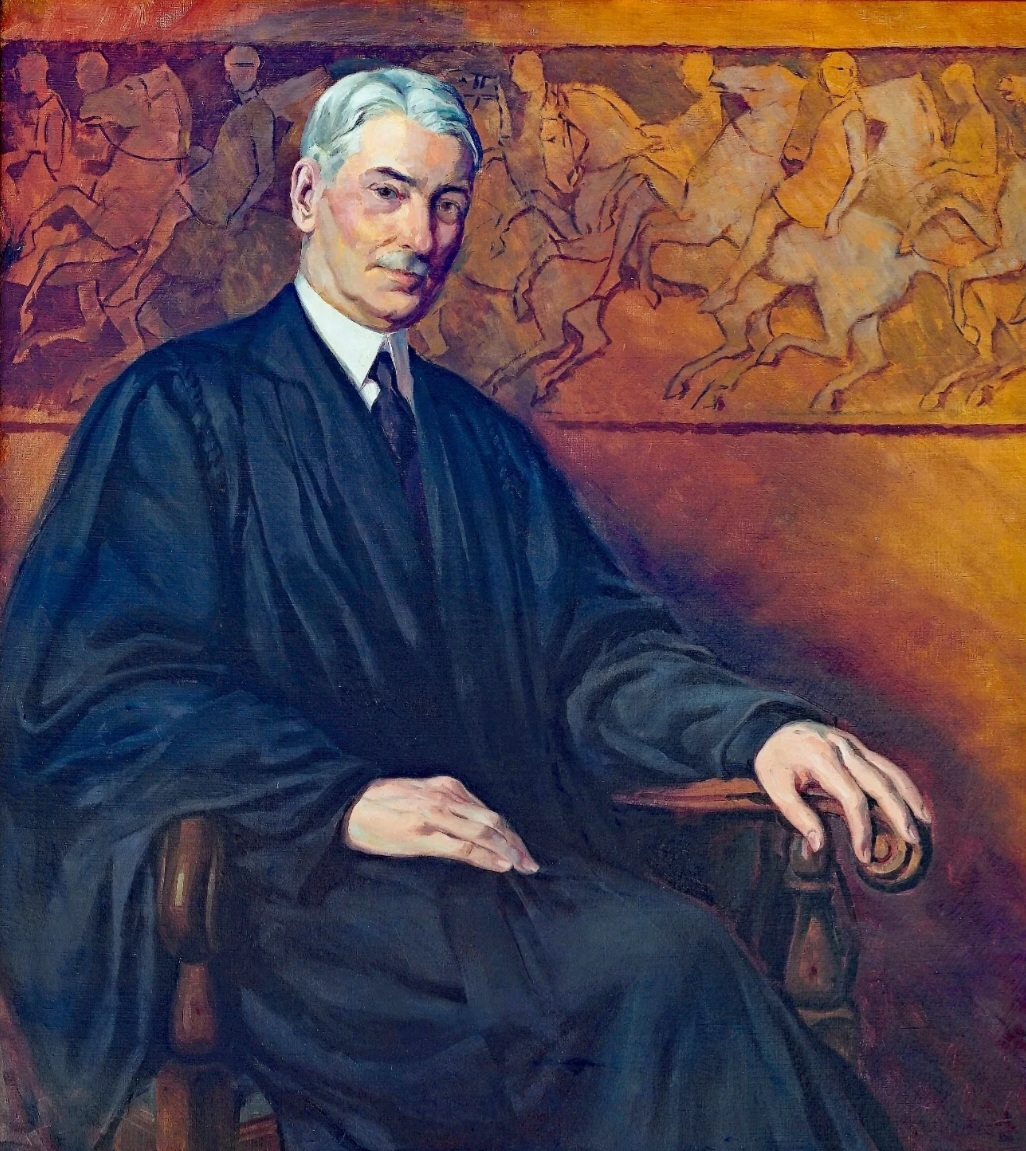
Portrait of Judge John McGoorty by J. Ernest Brierly, 1922.

John P. McGoorty (August 25, 1866–August 23, 1953) was an American judge and politician.

McGoorty was born in Conneaut, Ohio and went to the Berlin, Wisconsin public schools. McGoorty went to Chicago-Kent College of Law and to Lake Forest College. He practiced law in Chicago, Illinois. McGoorty served in the Illinois House of Representatives from 1897 to 1901 and from 1905 to 1909. McGoorty was a Democrat. He served on the Illinois Circuit Court from 1911 to 1915 and on the Illinois Superior and Crime Courts from 1923 to 1947. McGoory died at Wesley Memorial Hospital in Chicago, Illinois.
