= Lewis Stevenson (politician) =

American politician (1868–1929)

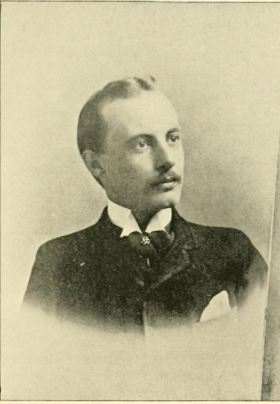

23rd Secretary of State of Illinois
- In office October 14, 1914 – January 6, 1917
- Governor: Edward F. Dunne
- Preceded by: Harry Woods
- Succeeded by: Louis Lincoln Emmerson

Personal details
- Born: Louis Green Stevenson; August 15, 1868 Chenoa, Illinois, U.S.
- Died: April 5, 1929 (aged 60) Bloomington, Illinois, U.S.
- Party: Democratic
- Spouse: Helen Louise Davis
- Children: 2, including Adlai Stevenson II
- Parents: Adlai Stevenson I; Letitia Green Stevenson
- Relatives: Stevenson family

Lewis Green Stevenson (August 15, 1868 – April 5, 1929) was an American politician. He was the Illinois Secretary of State from 1914 to 1917 and a member of Illinois's political Stevenson family.

== Early life ==
Born in Chenoa, Illinois, Stevenson was educated in the Bloomington public schools, at Phillips Exeter Academy, and at Illinois State Normal University (now Illinois State University). He died of a heart ailment, at his home, in Bloomington, Illinois.

Stevenson's father, Adlai Ewing Stevenson I, was the 23rd Vice President of the United States from 1893 to 1897. Stevenson's son, Adlai Ewing Stevenson II, was the Governor of Illinois, the Democratic nominee for President of the United States in 1952 and 1956 and later the United States Ambassador to the United Nations. His grandson, Adlai Ewing Stevenson III, was a U.S. senator from Illinois. The actor McLean Stevenson was his first cousin twice removed.

== Political career ==
Lewis followed in his father's footsteps as a Democratic Party leader. He served as his father's private secretary while his father was Vice President of the United States. Later, Lewis served as chairman of the Illinois State Board of Pardons, president of the Illinois Centennial Commission, and as Secretary of State under Governor Edward Dunne. He took an active part in the national conventions of the Democratic Party and was frequently consulted on party policy.

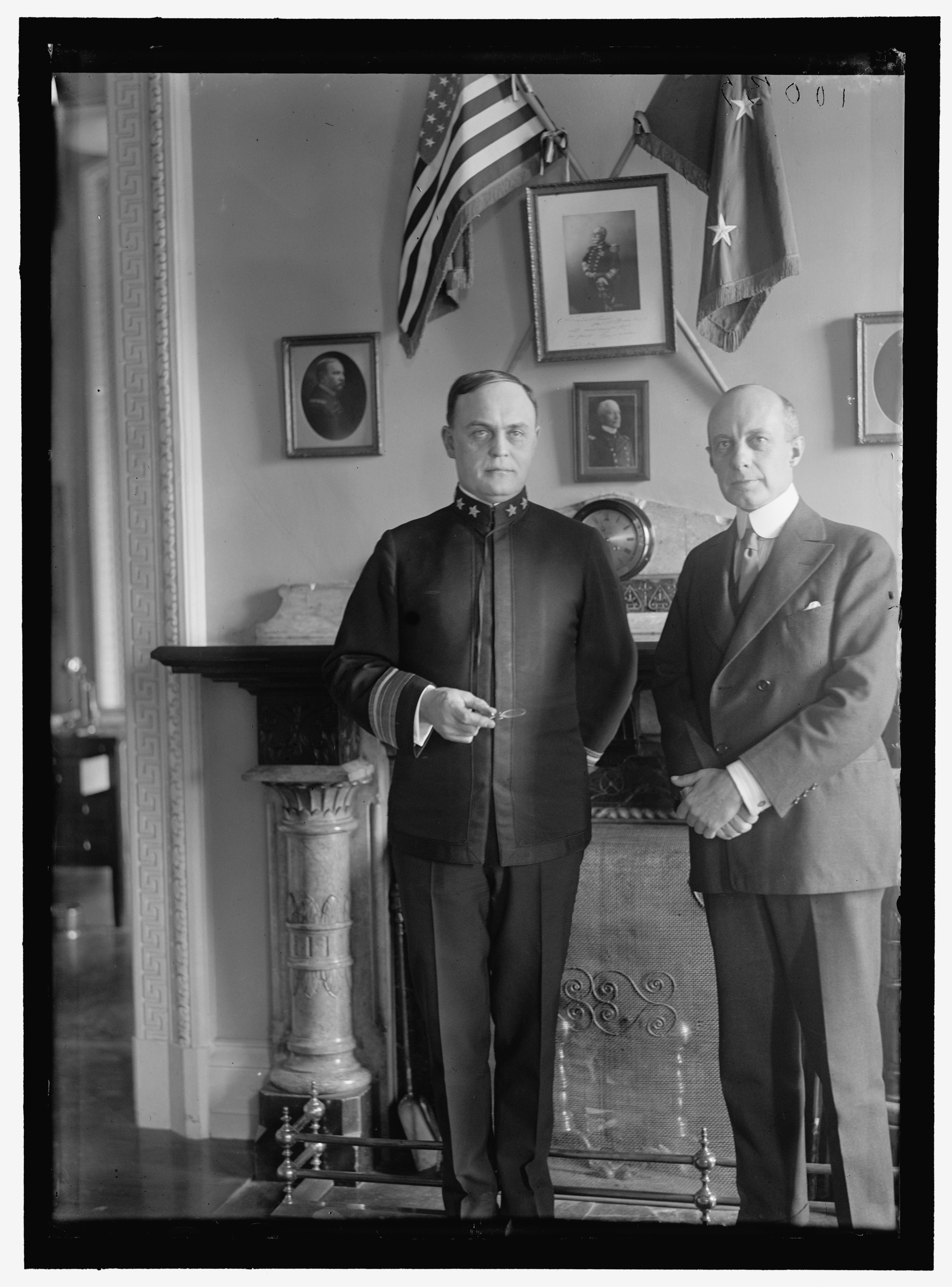
Stevenson (right) with Samuel McGowan (left) in 1917

Around 1893, Stevenson was offered the position of assistant paymaster of the Navy, but declined the offer. In 1917, he served as investigator for the Department of the Navy under its paymaster general, Samuel McGowan, a boyhood friend.

== Personal life ==
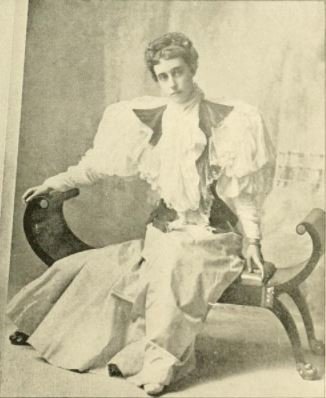
Helen Louise Davis

Lewis Stevenson married Helen Louise Davis, daughter of Pantagraph publisher W. O. Davis and granddaughter of Jesse Fell. They had two children, Elizabeth "Buffy" and Adlai Ewing Stevenson II. He owned three estates in Illinois, including a coal mine and 13,000 acres (5,300 ha) of farmland.

== Notes ==
Party political offices
Preceded by Harry Woods	Democratic nominee for Secretary of State of Illinois; 1916	Succeeded by Arthur W. Charles
Political offices
Preceded by Harry Woods	Secretary of State of Illinois; 1914–1917	Succeeded by Louis L. Emmerson
