= Adlai E. Stevenson I House =

Historic house in Illinois, United States

- U.S. National Register of Historic Places
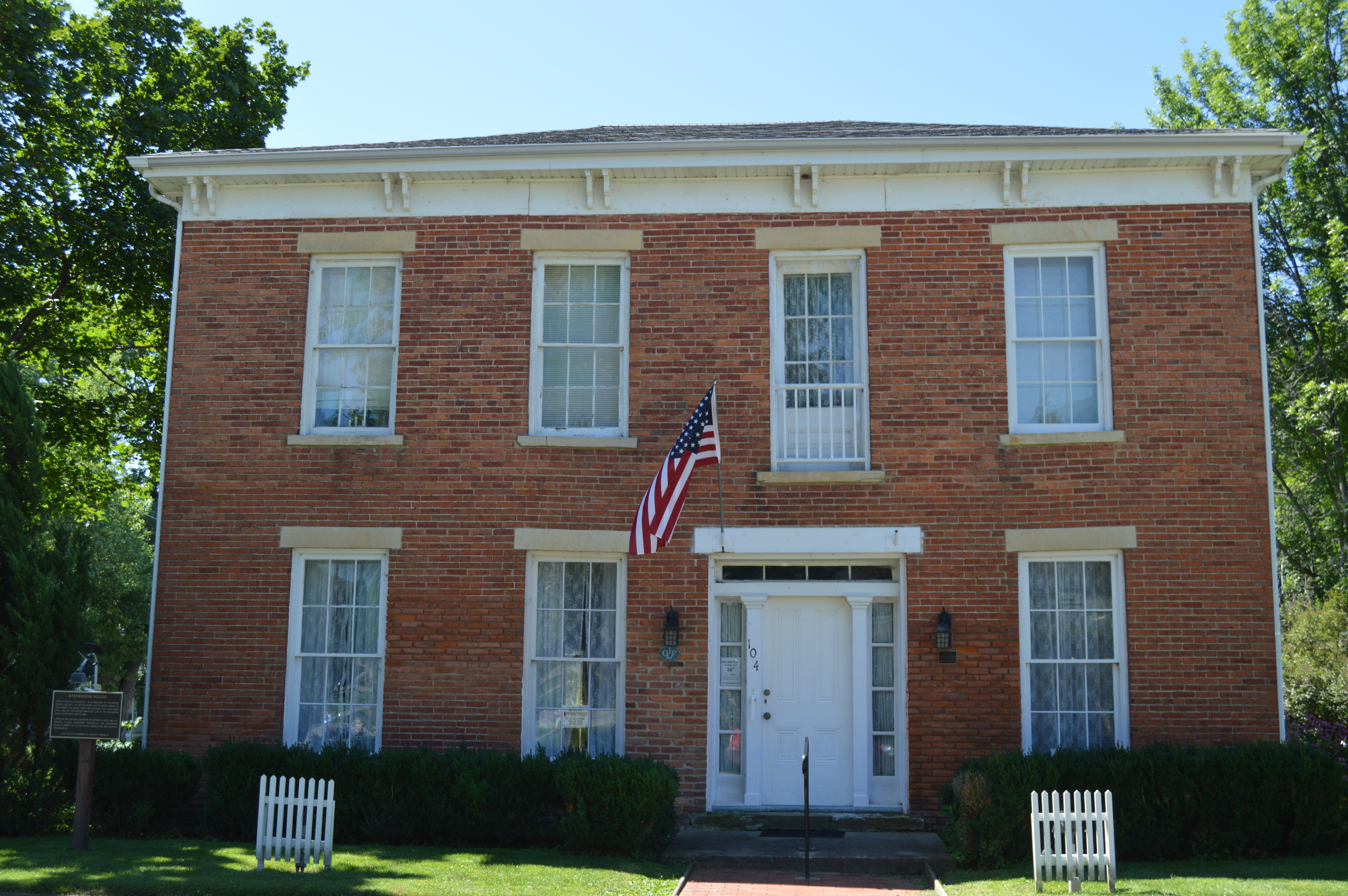

- Location within Illinois Location within the United States
- Location: 104 W. Walnut St., Metamora, Illinois
- Coordinates: 40°47′22″N 89°21′48″W
- Area: less than one acre
- Architect: Lemon, George
- Architectural style: Federal
- NRHP reference No.: 80001427
- Added to NRHP: March 18, 1980

The Adlai E. Stevenson I House is a historic house located at 104 West Walnut Street in Metamora, Illinois. The house was the home of U.S. Vice President Adlai Stevenson I. Stevenson lived in the house with his wife, Letitia Green, from 1866 until 1869, while he was a circuit lawyer on Illinois' 8th Judicial Circuit. He became a U.S. Representative in the 1870s and served as U.S. Postmaster General during Grover Cleveland's first term in office; during Cleveland's second term (1893–97), he served as vice president. The house, which was built in the late 1830s or early 1840s, has a Federal design with a decorated entrance that is flanked by pilasters and sidelights and topped by a transom.

The house was added to the National Register of Historic Places on March 18, 1980.
