= James A. Rose =

American politician

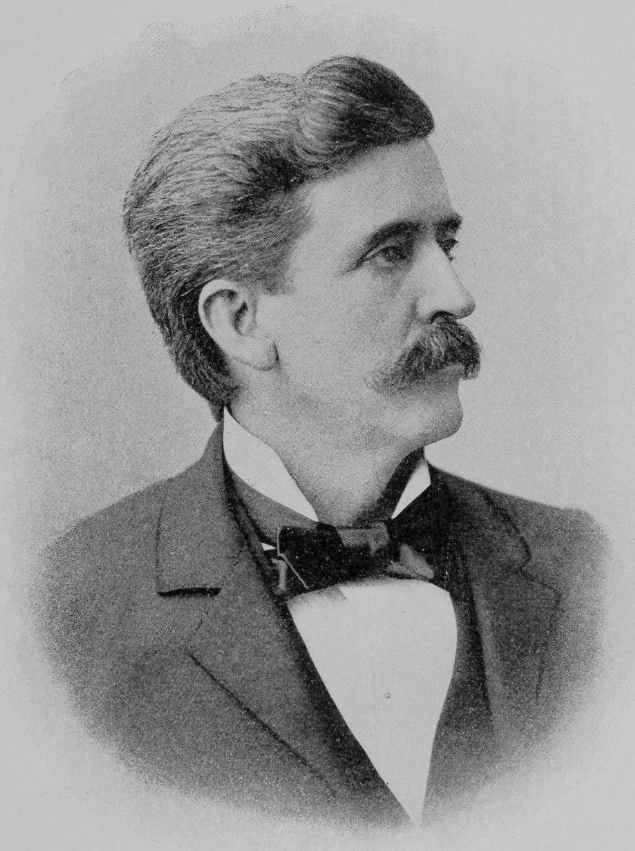

Illinois Secretary of State
- In office 1897–1912

Personal details
- Born: James Alexander Rose; October 13, 1850; Golconda, Illinois, U.S.
- Died: May 29, 1912 (aged 61); Springfield, Illinois, U.S.
- Political party: Republican
- Occupation: Politician, educator
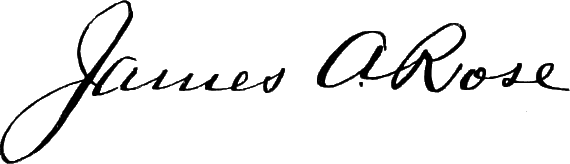
- Signature

James Alexander Rose (October 13, 1850 – May 29, 1912) was an American politician and educator.

== Biography ==
Born in Golconda, Pope County, Illinois, Rose went to Illinois Normal State University in Normal, Illinois. He taught school in Pope County, was elected county superintendent of schools in 1873, and state's attorney in 1881. A Republican, he served as Illinois Secretary of State from 1897 until his death in 1912. Rose died in Springfield, Illinois as a result of a stomach hemorrhage.

== Notes ==
Party political offices
Preceded by Isaac N. Pearson	Republican nominee for Secretary of State of Illinois; 1896, 1900, 1904, 1908	Succeeded by Cornelius J. Doyle
Political offices
Preceded by William H. Hinrichsen	Secretary of State of Illinois; 1897–1912	Succeeded by Cornelius J. Doyle
