= Stevenson House (Bloomington, Illinois) =

Historic house in Illinois, United States

- U.S. National Register of Historic Places
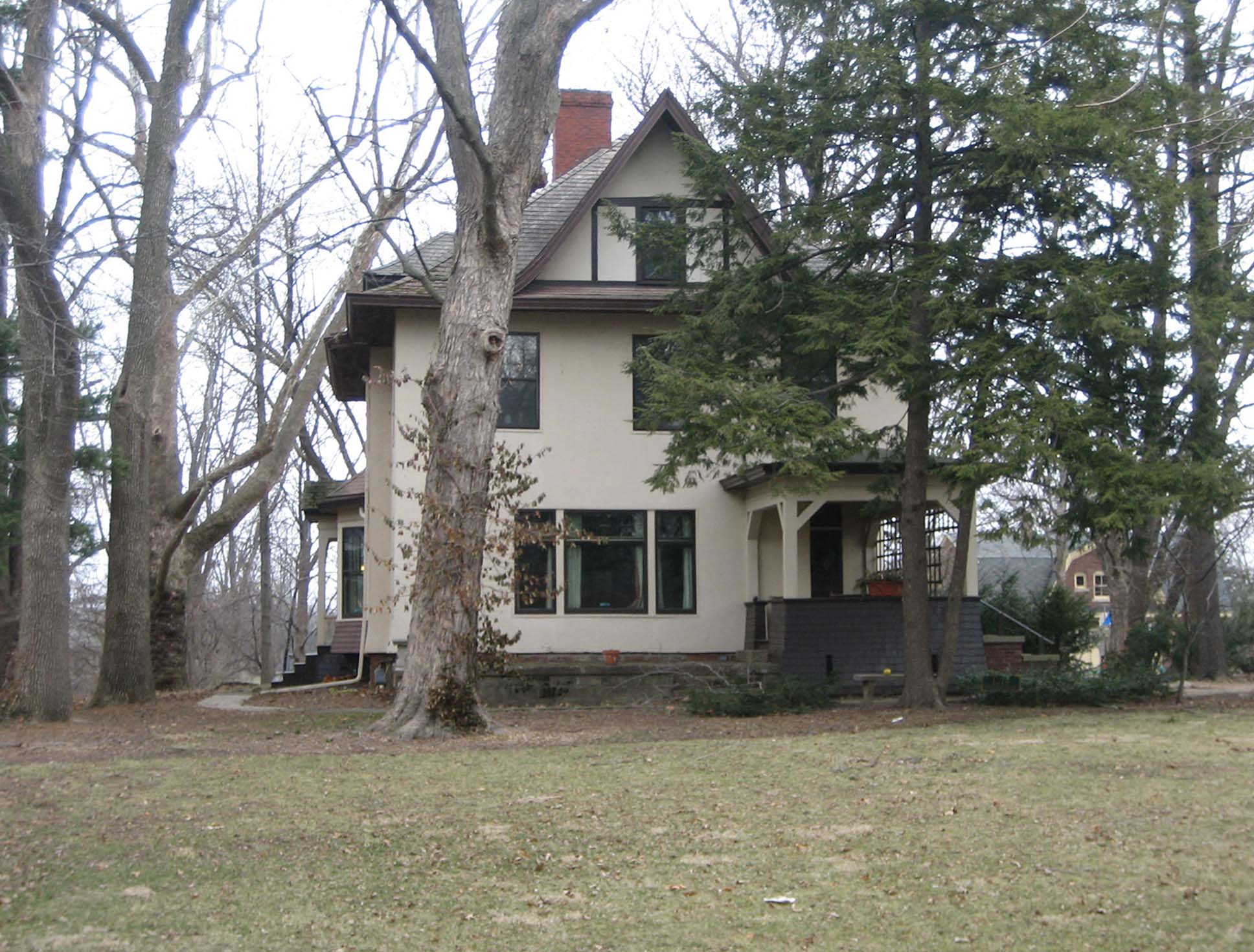

- Location within Illinois Location within the United States
- Location: 1316 E. Washington St., Bloomington, Illinois
- Coordinates: 40°28′39″N 88°59′1″W
- Area: 0.6 acres (0.24 ha)
- Built: 1900
- Architect: Pillsbury, Arthur
- NRHP reference No.: 74002196
- Added to NRHP: May 24, 1974

The Stevenson House, located at 1316 E. Washington St. in Bloomington, Illinois, was the boyhood home of Illinois governor and two-time Democratic presidential nominee Adlai Stevenson II. Architect Arthur Pillsbury designed the house in 1900 for original owner Lyman Graham. In 1906, six years after Adlai's birth, the Stevenson family bought the house. Adlai lived in the house through his junior year in high school to attend University High School in nearby Normal, Illinois; he subsequently graduated from the Choate School in Connecticut. He served as governor of Illinois from 1949 to 1953, ran for president on the Democratic ticket in 1952 and 1956, and served as U.S. Ambassador to the United Nations from 1961 until his death in 1965.

The house was added to the National Register of Historic Places on May 24, 1974.
