= Adlai Stevenson I =

Vice President of the United States from 1893 to 1897

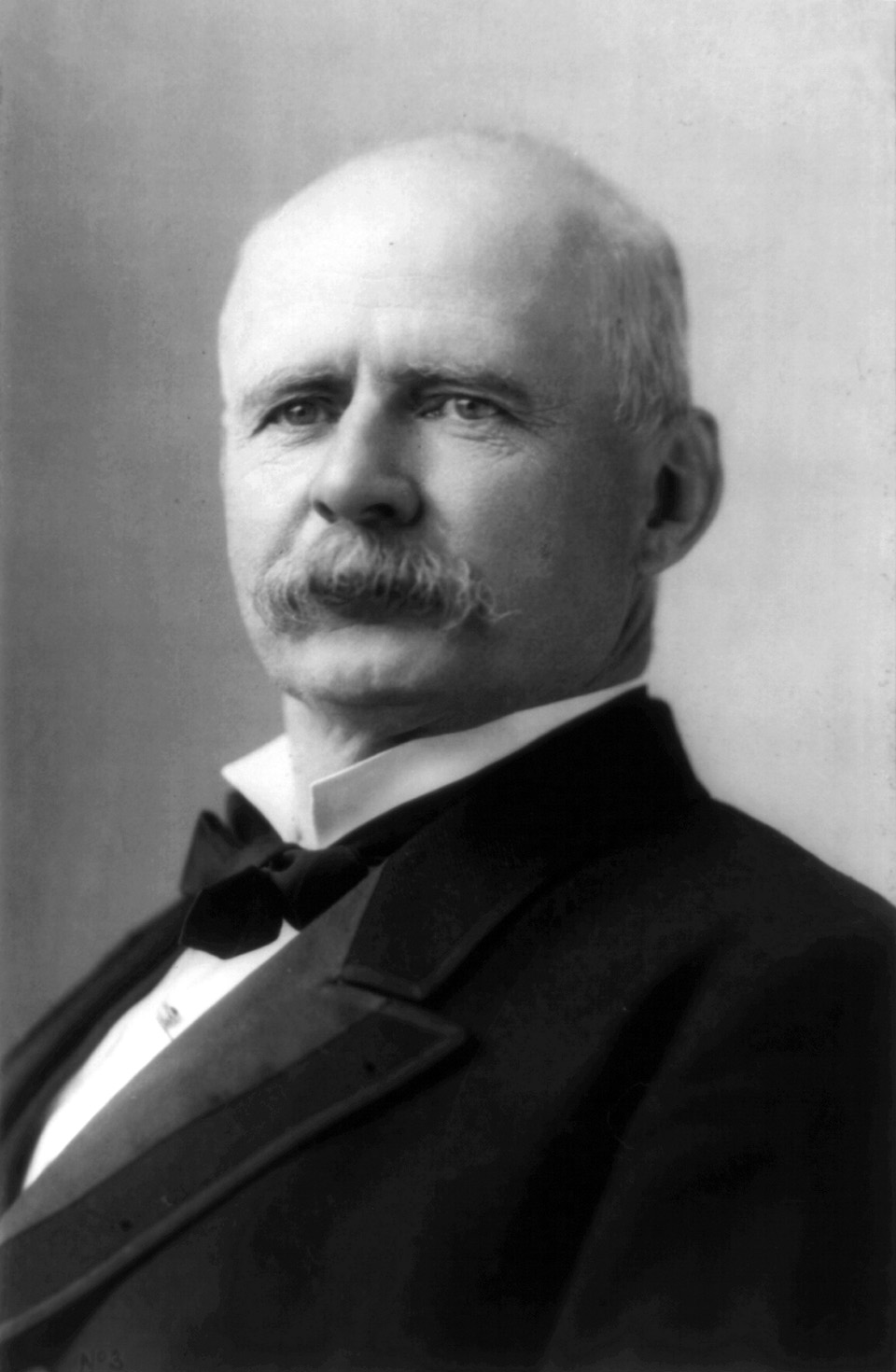
- Stevenson in 1892

23rd Vice President of the United States
- In office March 4, 1893 – March 4, 1897
- President: Grover Cleveland
- Preceded by: Levi P. Morton
- Succeeded by: Garret Hobart

21st First Assistant United States Postmaster General
- In office August 1, 1885 – March 4, 1889
- President: Grover Cleveland
- Preceded by: Malcolm Hay
- Succeeded by: James S. Clarkson

Member of the U.S. House of Representatives from Illinois's 13th district
- In office March 4, 1879 – March 3, 1881
- Preceded by: Thomas F. Tipton
- Succeeded by: Dietrich C. Smith
- In office March 4, 1875 – March 3, 1877
- Preceded by: John McNulta
- Succeeded by: Thomas F. Tipton

State's Attorney of Woodford County, Illinois
- In office 1859–1869
- Preceded by: Major W. Packard
- Succeeded by: Martin L. Newell

Personal details
- Born: Adlai Ewing Stevenson; October 23, 1835 Christian County, Kentucky, U.S.
- Died: June 14, 1914 (aged 78) Chicago, Illinois, U.S.
- Resting place: Evergreen Cemetery
- Party: Democratic
- Spouse: Letitia Green (m. 1866; died 1913)
- Children: 4, including Lewis
- Relatives: Stevenson family
- Education: Centre College (BA)

Adlai Ewing Stevenson I (October 23, 1835 – June 14, 1914) was an American politician and diplomat who served as the 23rd vice president of the United States from 1893 to 1897 under President Grover Cleveland. A member of the Democratic Party, Stevenson served as a U.S. Representative for Illinois in the late 1870s and early 1880s. He was the founder of the Stevenson political family.

Appointed assistant postmaster general of the United States in 1885, during Cleveland's first administration, Stevenson fired many Republican postal workers and replaced them with Southern Democrats. This earned him the enmity of the Republican-controlled Congress, but made him a favorite as Cleveland's running mate in 1892, and he was elected vice president of the United States. During his term of office, Stevenson supported the free-silver lobby against the gold-standard men like Cleveland, but was praised for governing in a dignified, non-partisan manner. He became the first vice president to serve under a president who won a non-consecutive second term for a second presidency. (Note: The only other to do so is JD Vance, who began his vice presidency in 2025 under Donald Trump following their victory in the 2024 election. Trump previously had Mike Pence as his vice president under his first presidency following their victory in the 2016 election.)

In 1900, he ran for vice president with William Jennings Bryan. He was the paternal grandfather of Adlai Stevenson II, a governor of Illinois and the unsuccessful Democratic presidential nominee in both 1952 and 1956.

== Ancestry ==
Adlai Ewing Stevenson was born in Christian County, Kentucky, on October 23, 1835, to John Turner and Eliza Ann Ewing Stevenson, Wesleyans of Scots-Irish descent. The Stevenson family is first recorded (as the Stephensons) in Roxburghshire, Scotland, in the early 18th century. The family appears to have had some wealth, as a private chapel in the Archdiocese of St Andrews bears their name. At some point, probably shortly after the Jacobite rising of 1715, the family migrated to County Antrim, Ireland, near Belfast. At least one Stephenson was a police officer. Adlai's great-grandfather William Stephenson was a tailor who specialized in millinery. After William's father died in the 1730s, his family moved to Lancaster County, Pennsylvania. William joined when his apprenticeship was completed in 1748.

In 1762, the family moved to what became Iredell County, North Carolina. Including lands given to his children, William Stephenson (Stevenson after the American Revolution) had amassed 3,400 acres (1,400 ha) of land by the time of his death. One branch of the family, including Adlai Stevenson's father, then moved to Kentucky in 1813.

== Early life ==
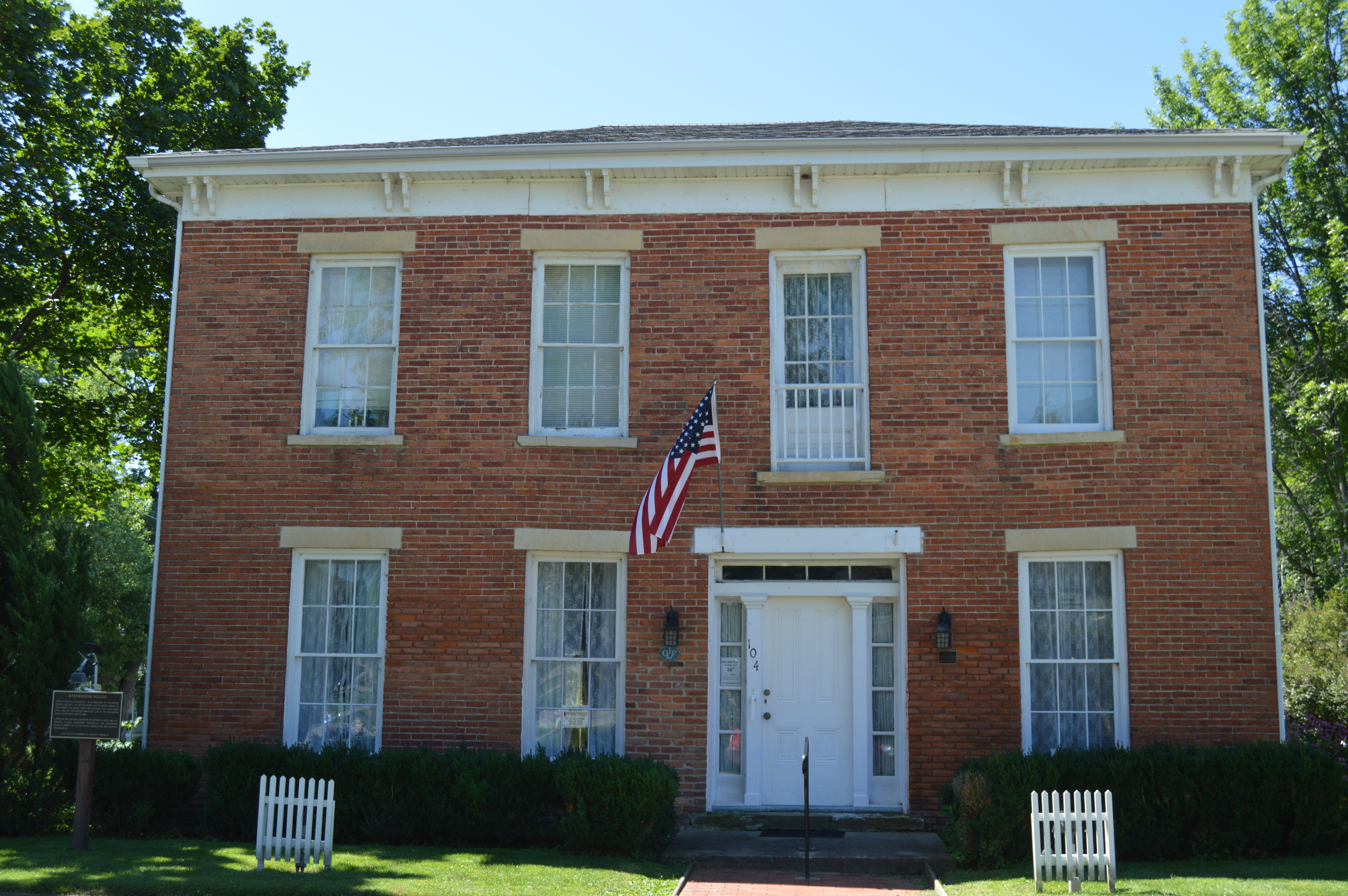
Stevenson's home in Metamora, IL

Stevenson was born on the family farm in Christian County. He attended Blue Water School in what became Herndon, Kentucky. His childhood playmates included James A. McKenzie, a future representative for Kentucky, and Amanda Barkley, the grandmother of future Vice President Alben W. Barkley. In 1850, when he was 14, frost killed the family's tobacco crop. Two years later, his father set free their few slaves and the family moved to Bloomington, Illinois, where his father operated a sawmill. Stevenson attended Illinois Wesleyan University at Bloomington and graduated from Centre College, in Danville, Kentucky, where he joined Phi Delta Theta. His father's death prompted Stevenson to return from Kentucky to Illinois to run the sawmill.

Stevenson studied law with Bloomington attorney Robert E. Williams. He was admitted to the bar in 1858, and commenced practice in Metamora. As a young lawyer, Stevenson encountered such celebrated Illinois attorneys as Stephen A. Douglas and Abraham Lincoln, and he campaigned for Douglas in his 1858 Senate race against Lincoln. Stevenson's dislike of Lincoln might have been prompted by a contentious meeting, at which Lincoln made several witty quips disparaging Stevenson. Stevenson made speeches against the "Know-Nothing" movement, a nativist group opposed to immigrants and Catholics. That stand helped cement his support in Illinois' large German and Irish communities. In a predominantly Republican area, the Democratic Stevenson won friends through his storytelling and his warm and engaging personality.

== Marriage and political life, 1859–1884 ==
Stevenson was state's attorney of Woodford County beginning in 1859. During the American Civil War, he was appointed a master in chancery (an aide in a court of equity). In 1864 Stevenson was a presidential elector for the Democratic ticket.

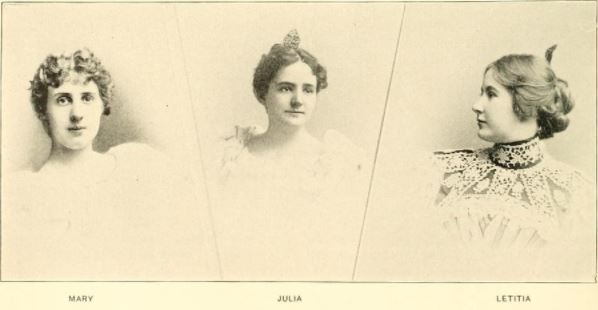
Mary, Julia and Letitia Stevenson

In 1866, he married Letitia Green. They had three daughters, Mary, Julia and Letitia, and a son, Lewis Stevenson. Letitia helped establish the Daughters of the American Revolution as a way of healing the divisions between the North and South after the Civil War, and succeeded the wife of Benjamin Harrison as the DAR's second president-general.

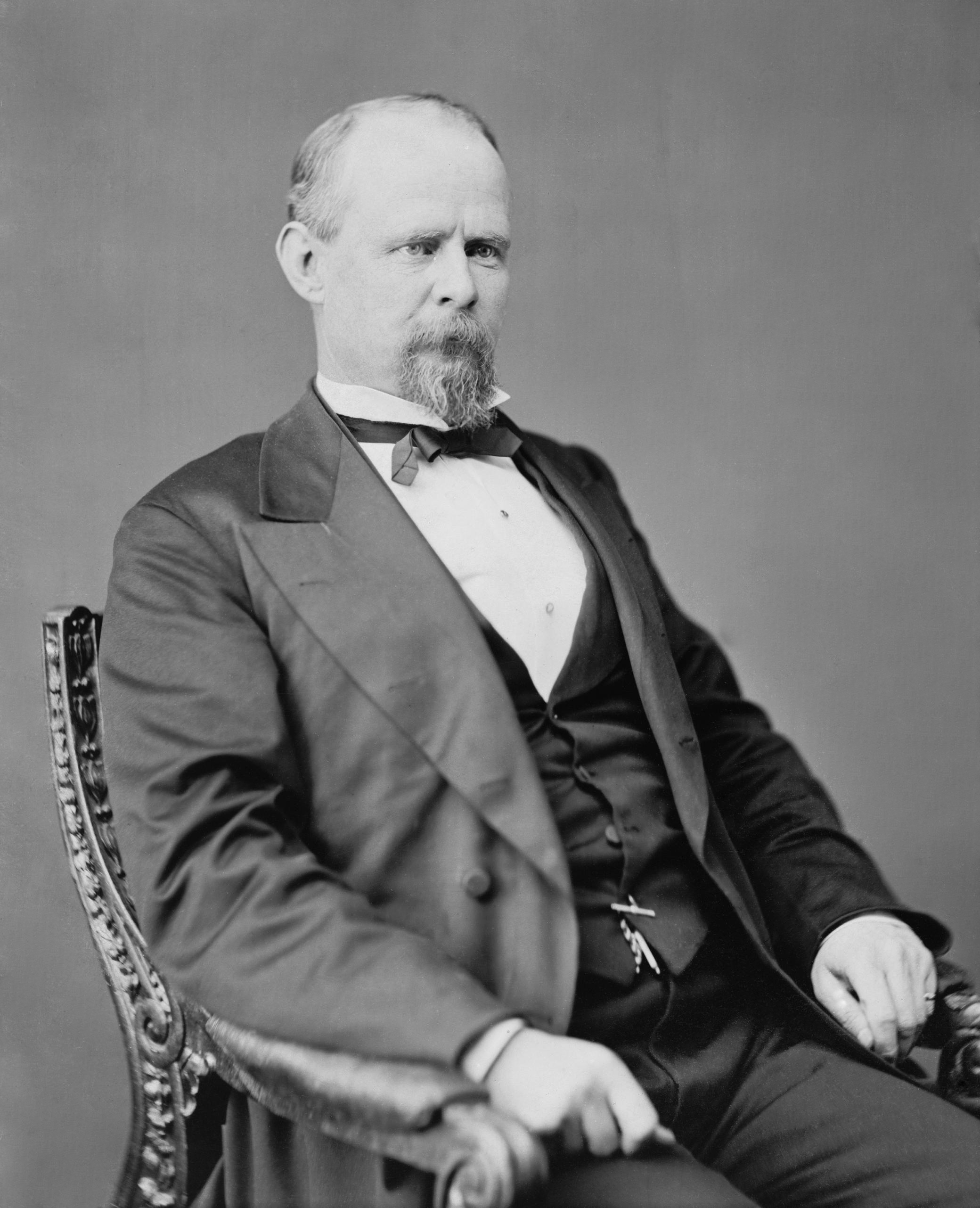
Stevenson as an Illinois representative, c. 1875–1877 or 1879–1881

In 1869, at the end of his term as state's attorney, he entered law practice with his cousin, James Stevenson Ewing, moving with his wife back to Bloomington, Illinois, and settling in a large house on Franklin Square. Stevenson & Ewing would become one of the state's most prominent law firms. Ewing would later become the U.S. ambassador to Belgium.

The Democratic Party nominated Stevenson for the United States Congress in 1874. Stevenson was well-liked by Republicans and levied influence in the local Masonic lodge. Stevenson also received the nomination of the Independent Reform Party, a state party that fought monopolies following the Panic of 1873. Stevenson campaigned against Republican incumbent John McNulta. He attacked McNulta's support for high tariffs and what became known as the Salary Grab Act, where congressmen increased their salaries by 50%. He spoke little of his own positions other than railroad regulation. McNulta attacked back, accusing Stevenson of membership in the Knights of the Golden Circle. Thanks to the votes siphoned away from the Republican Base by the Independent Reform Party, Stevenson won the election with 52% of the vote, though he did not carry his hometown of Bloomington. He was elevated to the 44th United States Congress, the first under Democratic control since the Civil War.

In 1876, Stevenson was an unsuccessful candidate for reelection. The Republican presidential ticket, headed by Rutherford B. Hayes, carried his district, and Stevenson was narrowly defeated, getting 49.6 percent of the vote. In 1878, he ran on both the Democratic and Greenback tickets and won, returning to a House from which one-third of his earlier colleagues had either voluntarily retired or been removed by the voters. In 1880, again a presidential election year, he once more lost narrowly, and he lost again in 1882 in his final race for Congress. He considered a run in 1884, but a redistricting made his district safely Republican.

In between legislative sessions, Stevenson increased his prominence in Bloomington. He rose to become grandmaster of his Masonic chapter and founded the Bloomington Daily Bulletin in 1881, a Democratic newspaper that sought to challenge the Republican Pantagraph. Stevenson directed the People's Bank and co-managed the McLean County Coal Company with his brothers. The company founded Stevensonville, a company town near the mine shafts. Employees were purportedly fired if they did not support Stevenson in an election year.

== Election of Grover Cleveland in 1884 and the U.S. Post Office ==
The Stevensons vacationed at lake resorts in Wisconsin during summers. There, Stevenson befriended William Freeman Vilas, a growing voice among Midwest Democrats and a friend of Grover Cleveland. Stevenson was a delegate to the 1884 Democratic National Convention, and after briefly supporting a local candidate, he threw his support behind Cleveland. Vilas and Stevenson personally informed Cleveland of the nomination. When Cleveland was elected that November, Vilas was named postmaster general. Although a different supporter was initially named assistant postmaster general, Stevenson received the position after the first choice fell ill.

The new position put Stevenson in charge of the largest patronage system in the country. Like his predecessors, Stevenson removed tens of thousands of political opponents from postal positions and replaced them with Democrats. Just before Cleveland left office, he nominated Stevenson for the Supreme Court of the District of Columbia judgeship left vacant by the death of William Matthews Merrick. Republicans controlled the U.S. Senate and refused to act, exacting a measure of revenge on Stevenson for replacing Republican postmasters while also secure in the knowledge that they would be able to confirm a Republican nominee after Benjamin Harrison was inaugurated. A disappointed Stevenson returned to Bloomington at the conclusion of Cleveland's term.

== Vice presidency (1893–1897) ==
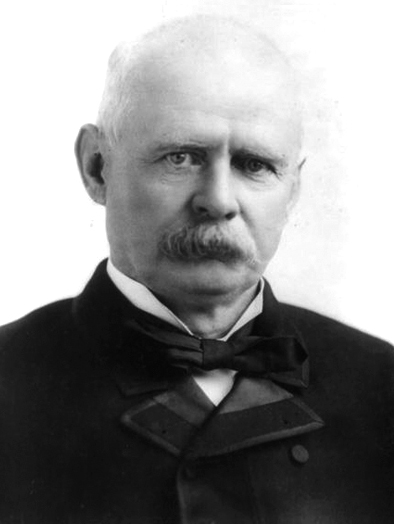
Stevenson, c. 1892

Cleveland was renominated for president on the first ballot at the 1892 Democratic National Convention in Chicago. At the time, the vice presidency was considered a "final resting place for has-beens and never-wases." Nonetheless, Stevenson's brothers and cousins advocated for his nomination for the position. Likewise, Carter Harrison III (the mayor of Chicago) threw his support behind Stevenson as a native son, believing that he could influence the state to vote Democratic. Stevenson was nominated on the first ballot.

Stevenson backed off his former support of greenbacks in favor of Cleveland's gold standard policy. Unlike Cleveland, who only appeared once in public to support his candidacy, Stevenson traveled with his wife across the country. Cleveland's advisers sent Stevenson to the South to curb the growing appeal of the Populist Party. With his Kentucky roots, Stevenson proved popular at his Southern engagements. Stevenson also publicly opposed the Lodge Bill, a proposed bill which would have enfranchised Southern blacks. The winning Cleveland-Stevenson ticket carried Illinois, although not Stevenson's home district.

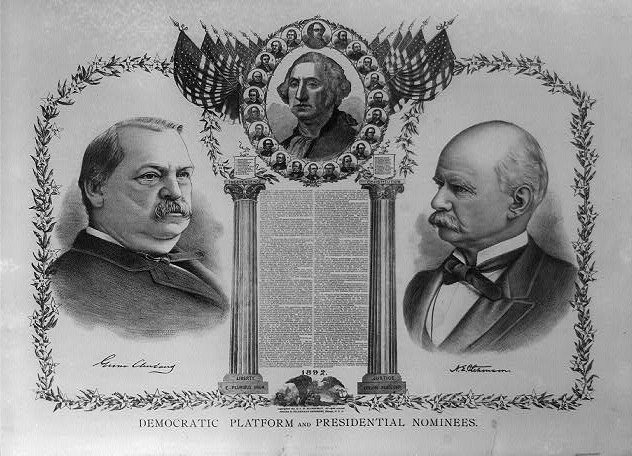
A campaign poster for "Cleve and Steve"

Civil service reformers held out hope for the second Cleveland administration but saw Vice President Stevenson as a symbol of the spoils system. He never hesitated to feed names of Democrats to the Post Office Department. Once he called at the US Treasury Department to protest against an appointment and was shown a letter he had written endorsing the candidate. Stevenson told the treasury officials not to pay attention to any of his written endorsements; if he really favored someone he would tell them personally.

A habitual cigar-smoker, Cleveland developed oral cancer requiring immediate surgery in the summer of 1893. The president insisted the surgery be kept secret to avoid another panic on Wall Street. While on a yacht in New York Harbor that summer, Cleveland had part of his upper jaw removed and replaced with an artificial device in an operation that left no outward scar. The cancer surgery remained secret for another quarter century. Cleveland's aides explained that he had merely had dental work. His vice president little realized how close he came to the presidency that summer.

Adlai Stevenson enjoyed his role as vice president, presiding over the U.S. Senate, "the most august legislative assembly known to men." He won praise for ruling in a dignified, nonpartisan manner. In personal appearance he stood six feet tall and was "of fine personal bearing and uniformly courteous to all." Although he was often a guest at the White House, Stevenson admitted that he was less an adviser to the president than "the neighbor to his counsels." He credited the President with being "courteous at all times" but noted that "no guards were necessary to the preservation of his dignity. No one would have thought of undue familiarity." For his part, President Cleveland snorted that the Vice President had surrounded himself with a coterie of free-silver men dubbed the "Stevenson cabinet." The president even mused that the economy had gotten so bad and the Democratic Party so divided that "the logical thing for me to do ... was to resign and hand the Executive branch to Mr. Stevenson," joking that he would try to get his friends jobs in Stevenson's new cabinet.

== Post-vice presidency (1897–1914) ==
=== Presidential campaigns of 1896 and 1900 ===
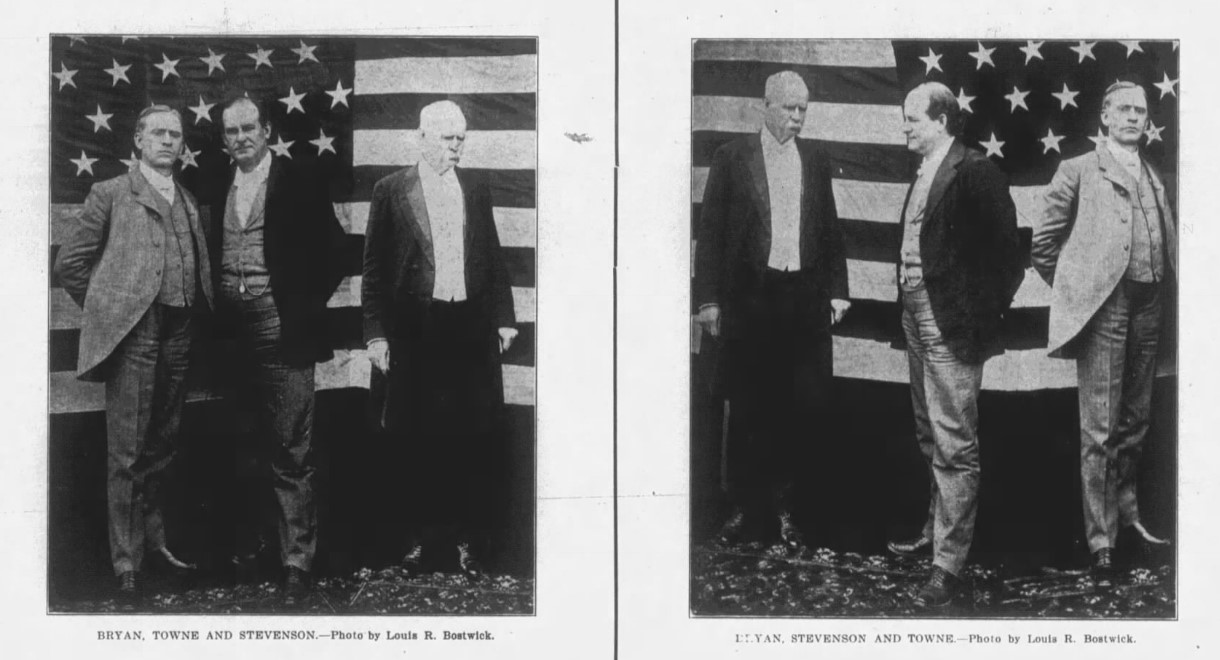
First photo, from left: Charles A. Towne, William Jennings Bryan, and Stevenson. Second photo, from left: Stevenson, Bryan, and Towne. Both photos taken in July 1900.

Stevenson was mentioned as a candidate to succeed Cleveland in 1896. Although he chaired the Illinois delegation to the Democratic National Convention, he gained little support. Stevenson, 60 years old, received a smattering of votes, but the convention was taken by storm by a 36-year-old former representative from Nebraska, William Jennings Bryan, who delivered his fiery "Cross of Gold" speech in favor of a free silver plank in the platform. Not only did the Democrats repudiate Cleveland by embracing free silver, but they also nominated Bryan for president. Many Cleveland Democrats, including most Democratic newspapers, refused to support Bryan, but Vice President Stevenson loyally endorsed the ticket.

After the 1896 election, Bryan remained the titular leader of the Democrats and frontrunner for the nomination in 1900. Much of the newspaper speculation about who would run as the party's vice-presidential candidate centered on Indiana Senator Benjamin Shively. When reporter Arthur Wallace Dunn interviewed Shively at the convention, the senator said he "did not want the glory of a defeat as a vice presidential candidate." Disappointed, Dunn said that he still had to file a story on the vice-presidential nomination, and then added: "I believe I'll write a piece about old Uncle Adlai." Shively responded:

That's a good idea. Stevenson is just the man. There you have it. Uniting the old Cleveland element with the new Bryan Democracy. You've got enough for one story. But say, this is more than a joke. Stevenson is just the man.

For the rest of the day, Dunn heard other favorable remarks about Stevenson, and by that night the former vice president was the leading contender, since no one else was "very anxious to be the tail of what they considered was a forlorn hope ticket."

Political cartoon in Judge magazine, 1892

The Populists had already nominated the ticket of Bryan and Charles A. Towne, a pro-silver Republican from Minnesota, with the tacit understanding that Towne would step aside if the Democrats nominated someone else. Bryan preferred his good friend Towne, but Democrats wanted one of their own, and the regular element of the party felt comfortable with Stevenson. Towne withdrew and campaigned for Bryan and Stevenson. As a result, Stevenson, who had run with Cleveland in 1892, now ran in 1900 with Cleveland's opponent Bryan. Twenty-five years senior to Bryan, Stevenson added age and experience to the ticket. Nevertheless, their effort failed badly against the Republican ticket of incumbent president William McKinley and Theodore Roosevelt.

Stevenson was the third U.S. vice president to win nomination for the office with a different running mate. He was seeking to follow George Clinton who served in Thomas Jefferson's second term and James Madison's first as well as John C. Calhoun who served under John Quincy Adams and then in Andrew Jackson's first term. As of 2025, Republican Charles W. Fairbanks' failure to win a second vice-presidential term in 1916 is the only example since.

=== Final years ===
By May 1899, the North American Trust Company had directors such as John G. Carlisle, Adlai E. Stevenson and Wager Swayne.

After the 1900 election, Stevenson returned again to private practice in Illinois. He made one last attempt at office in a race for governor of Illinois in 1908, at age 73, losing narrowly. In 1909 he was brought in by founder Jesse Grant Chapline to aid distance learning school La Salle Extension University. After that, he retired to Bloomington, where his Republican neighbors described him as "windy but amusing."

Stevenson's wife Letitia died on December 25, 1913. William Jennings Bryan sent a letter of condolence to Stevenson. After this, Stevenson was emotionally broken, and only lived six more months. He died of heart failure in Chicago, on June 14, 1914, aged 78. His body is interred in a family plot in Evergreen Cemetery, Bloomington, Illinois.

== Legacy ==
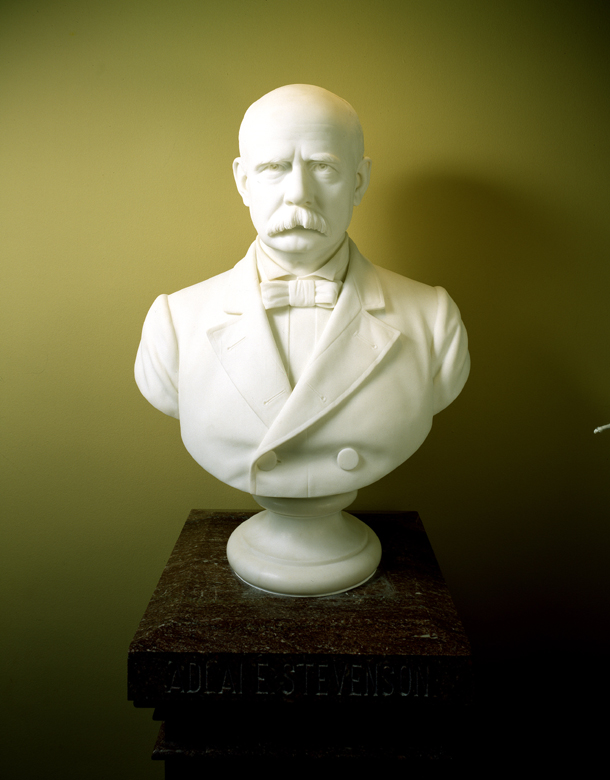
Senate bust of Stevenson in the U.S. Capitol

Stevenson was the founder and patriarch of the Stevenson political family, which has been called "Illinois's longest-lasting political dynasty–the only one to span four generations". Stevenson's son, Lewis G. Stevenson, was Illinois secretary of state (1914–1917). Stevenson's grandson Adlai Ewing Stevenson II was the Democratic nominee for president of the United States in 1952 and 1956 and governor of Illinois (1949–1953). Great-grandson Adlai Ewing Stevenson III was a U.S. senator from Illinois from 1970 to 1981 and an unsuccessful candidate for governor of Illinois in 1982 and 1986. He was also a contender for the 1976 Democratic vice presidential nomination.

There is a bust of Stevenson in the United States Capitol building as part of the United States Senate Vice Presidential Bust Collection. It was sculpted in 1894 by Franklin Simmons. Reportedly, Stevenson never sat to model for it, and Simmons only used photographs of Stevenson for likeness. The bust originally sat on a gallery-level niche in the Senate chamber, but in 1910 the bust collection was reorganized, and Stevenson's bust was placed in the main Senate corridor. In 1991 it was moved to the opposite end of the corridor, which required moving the bust of Vice President Charles W. Fairbanks. Stevenson's bust was moved that time to make room for the incoming bust of then-president and former vice president George H. W. Bush.

In 1962, Stevenson's alma mater, Centre College, named a newly built residence hall "Stevenson House" in his honor. They had previously awarded him an honorary degree in 1893.

Stevenson's home in Metamora, Illinois is now a museum. It was the family residence from 1859 to 1869.

== Footnotes ==
U.S. House of Representatives
Preceded by John McNulta	Member of the U.S. House of Representatives from Illinois's 13th congressional district 1875–1877	Succeeded by Thomas F. Tipton
Preceded by Thomas F. Tipton	Member of the U.S. House of Representatives from Illinois's 13th congressional district 1879–1881	Succeeded by Dietrich C. Smith
Party political offices
Preceded by Allen G. Thurman	Democratic nominee for Vice President of the United States; 1892	Succeeded by Arthur Sewall
Preceded by Arthur Sewall	Democratic nominee for Vice President of the United States; 1900	Succeeded by Henry G. Davis
Preceded by Lawrence B. Stringer	Democratic nominee for Governor of Illinois; 1908	Succeeded by Edward Dunne
Political offices
Preceded by Levi P. Morton	Vice President of the United States; 1893–1897	Succeeded by Garret Hobart
