= Adlai E. Stevenson High School =

Adlai E. Stevenson High School can refer to:

- Adlai E. Stevenson High School (Lincolnshire, Illinois)
- Adlai E. Stevenson High School (Livonia, Michigan)
- Adlai E. Stevenson High School (New York City)
- Adlai E. Stevenson High School (Sterling Heights, Michigan)
