= Stevenson College (University of California, Santa Cruz) =

Residential college of the University of California, Santa Cruz

Coordinates: 36.99701°N 122.05165°W

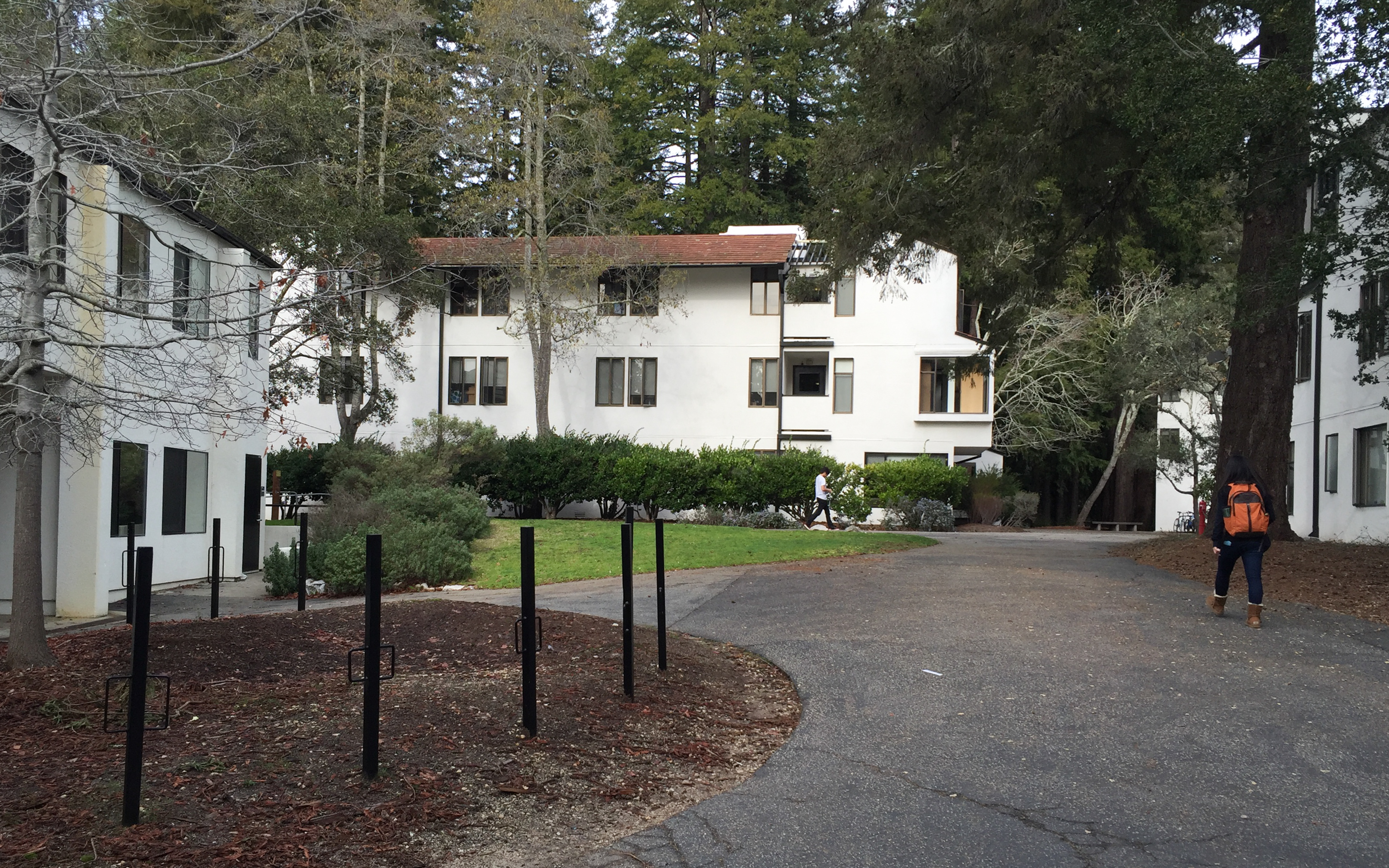
- Motto: Self and Society.
- Type: Residential college
- Established: 1966
- Provost: Alice Yang
- Undergraduates: 1434
- Location: University of California; 1156 High Street; Santa Cruz, CA 95064, Santa Cruz, California
- Campus: Suburban/Sylvan
- Colors: UCSC Blue; UCSC Gold
- Nickname: Stevensonian
- Website: www.stevenson.ucsc.edu/

Adlai E. Stevenson College, known colloquially as Stevenson College, is a residential college at the University of California, Santa Cruz. Currently, the college is host to the Linguistics Department, as well as many humanities faculty.

The college was named after Adlai Stevenson, an American politician and United Nations ambassador. The college was founded in 1966, a year after the establishment of the university and its first college, Cowell.

== Core course ==
The core course at Stevenson College is Self & Society. It is the only two-quarter long core course at the university and students can earn up to five general education requirements.

The course holds an emphasis on analytical writing, critical thinking, and oral presentation skills. Due to the broad nature of the course, students find themselves learning about and discussing religion, political theory, social criticism, and literature. Some texts that the course includes are the Bible, the Bhagavad Gita, the Koran, Plato's Five Dialogues, The Autobiography of Malcolm X, Sigmund Freud's Society and Its Discontents, Sartre's Existentialism is a Humanism, The Communist Manifesto, Persepolis (comics), and much more. Students enjoy the small seminar sections, to discuss many ideas relating to “self” and “society.”

== Living at Stevenson ==
At Stevenson College, there are eight dormitory houses that are separated into two adjacent locations: “upper quad” and “lower quad.” Each house contains single, double, triple, and quad rooms, and can house approximately 60 students. Stevenson College also has apartments that are an option for non-freshman undergraduate students. They house approximately 136 students, and come fully furnished.

The knoll, which has views of Monterey Bay, is a common hangout for Stevenson students, with students studying, napping, and sun bathing on the knoll throughout the year.

The Stevenson Coffee House is also a hangout where students and professors eat, socialize, and study. The Stevenson Library is a quieter location to work on papers and assignments.

Stevenson College is located above the university's gym and pool.

== Community at Stevenson ==
Stevenson College also holds events for its community. College Night happens two to three times a quarter, where students eat specially themed meals with some type of live entertainment. Open Mic Nights at the Stevenson Coffee House are also an event that occurs several times a month. Anybody can sign up, and some students perform songs, recite poetry, or perform magic tricks. The Resident Assistants (RAs) at Stevenson College also host events each quarter.
